= Tropic (Josep Renau) =

1945 painting by Josep Renau

- Trópico
- Artist: Josep Renau
- Year: 1945
- Medium: Oil on masonite
- Dimensions: 49 cm × 68 cm (19.3 in × 26.8 in)
- Location: Museo Nacional Centro de Arte Reina Sofía (loan), Madrid
- Owner: Private Collection

Tropic or Trópico is a 1945 painting by Spanish artist Josep Renau. Renau executed the painting during his exile in México, while he collaborated with Mexican muralist painters such as David Alfaro Siqueiros.

== Description ==
The painting represents a landscape, probably a Mexican natural space. Three vultures surround a fish skeleton on the lower right side of an uninhabited landscape. The scene evokes the desolation and destruction of humankind provoked by the wars of the 20th century, in the precise year of the end of World War II, which left a death toll of 60 million people.

Tropic is Renau's personal response to the grief and mourning provoked by the Spanish Civil War and World War II. The painting is one of the most important and influential works by the artist. Renau depicts a landscape with the plastic means of the Escuela de Vallecas, a group of modern Spanish painters pursuing the representation of the Castilian topography as a ruthless land. Both this reference to the Spanish art of the 1930s and the vultures eating carrion as an allegory of modern wars give this painting a deep sense of melancholy and tragedy. In this work, Renau advances the presence of skulls that Picasso used recurrently after 1945 to express the trauma of World War II and his experience in the Paris of the German Occupation.

Renau reacts to the trauma of war with angular shapes and expressionistic brushstrokes that remain close to the language of Picasso's Guernica and Joan Miró's The Reaper, two large-format paintings conceived for the Spanish Pavilion in the Exposition Internationale des Arts et Techniques dans la Vie Moderne (Paris International Exposition) in the 1937 World's Fair in Paris. Renau played a crucial role in the gestation of the Spanish Pavilion; he was responsible for Picasso's participation and executed a series of photomurals that covered the exterior of the building designed by Josep Lluis Sert and Luis Lacasa.

== Provenance ==
Renau considered this work one of the most important pieces in his personal collection and took the painting with him when he left México for East Berlin in 1958. Since 1976, the painting was in the collection of Manfred Schmidt, Germany. As for 2016, it is owned by a private collector in the United States, and is on long-term loan to the Museo Reina Sofía in Madrid, where it can be seen together with Picasso's Guernica in gallery 206.
