= CRAI Library of the Pavilion of the Republic =

Library in Barcelona, Catalonia, Spain

CRAI Biblioteca Pavelló de la República
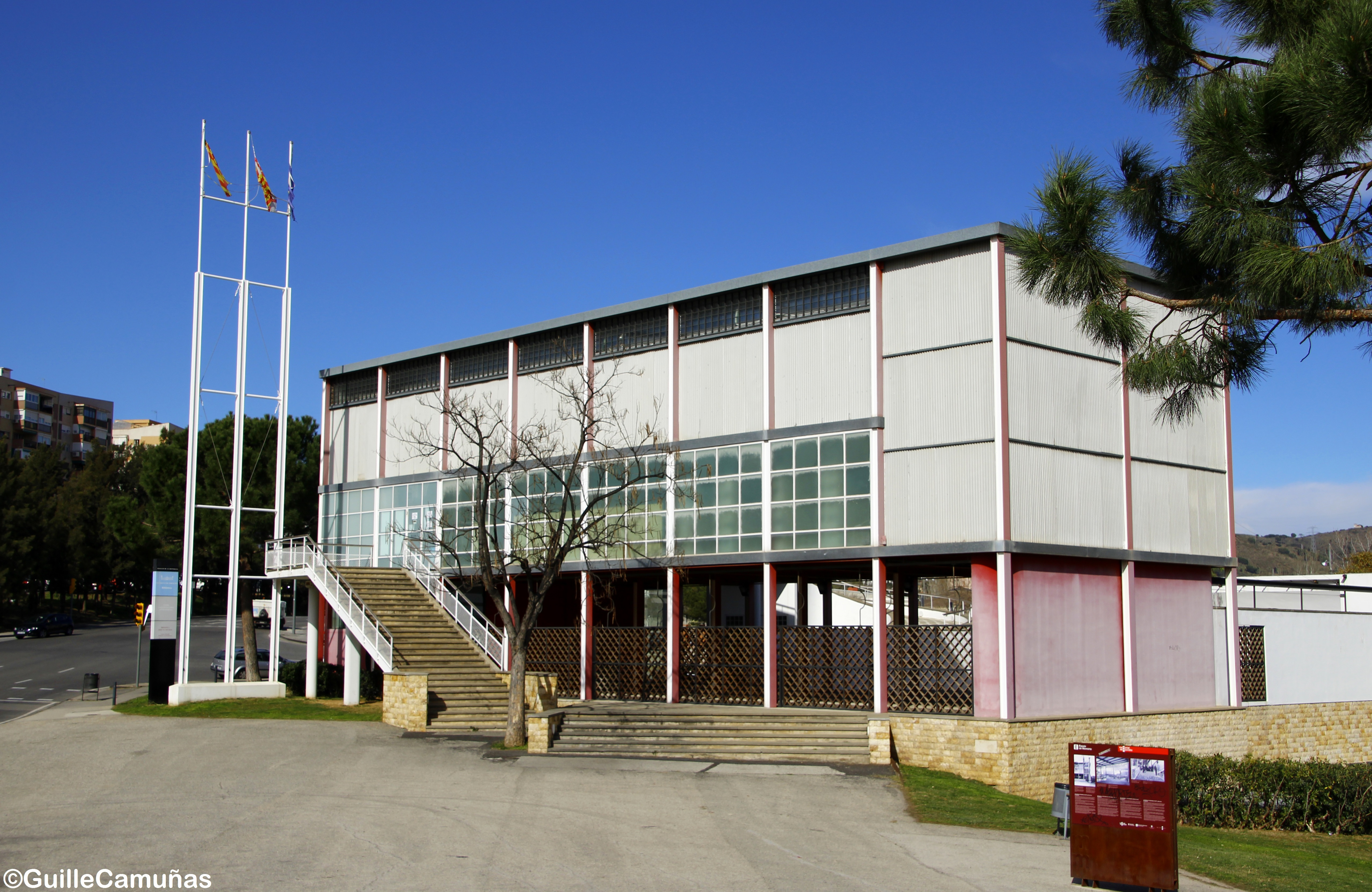
- 41°25′51″N 2°9′4″E
- Location: Barcelona
- Established: 1996

Collection
- Size: Over than 105,000 copies among books and pamphlets compose the library's collection. In the newspapers archive there are 10,000 titles and the archive have over 537 lineal meters.

Access and use
- Population served: The library is open to everybody

Other information
- Website: Biblioteca Pavelló de la República

The CRAI Library of the Pavilion of the Republic (Pavelló de la República (ca)) is an archive and library focused on the Second Spanish Republic, the Spanish Civil War, exile from Spain during Francoist Spain and Spain's transition to democracy. The library is one branch of the umbrella library, the "Resource Center for Learning and Research Library" (CRAI) of the University of Barcelona in Barcelona, Catalonia, Spain, incorporating numerous branches dedicated to particular fields. The Pavilion library also has important materials on the Soviet Bloc and on the international political history of the twentieth history, particularly World War II. In 1996, the CRAI Pavilion Library incorporated the collections of the University and the Figueras Foundation. The library is housed in the Spanish Pavilion building, which was originally designed and built for the International Exhibition in Paris in 1937. The building was recreated in Barcelona in 1992.

== The CRAI Library of the Spanish Pavilion in Barcelona ==
The CRAI Library ("Centre de Recursos per a l'Aprenentatge i la Investigació" (ca), or "Resource Center for Learning and Research") is a large, extensive library of the University of Barcelona supporting education and research. The branch library, the CRAI Library of the Pavilion of the Republic (CRAI Biblioteca del Pavelló de la República (ca)), has one of the most important collections in the world on Second Republic Civil War, Francoism, Transition and exile in Spain. The collections include the Catalonia and the International Center for Historical Studies, founded by Jaume Vicens Vives.

The library is housed in the recreated Spanish Pavilion, originally designed and built for the International Exhibition in Paris in 1937.

== History of the building ==
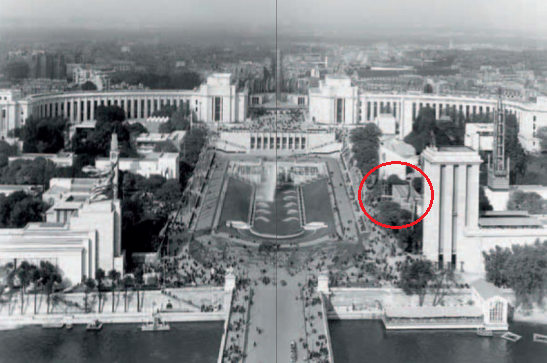
The original location of the building in Paris in 1937.

In 1937, during the Spanish Civil War, the government of the Spanish Republic participated in the Exposition Internationale des Arts et Techniques dans la vie moderne, better known as the Paris International Exhibition of 1937. The outbreak of the war in 1936 had a clear impact on the Spanish exhibition, and drew significant international attention to it. The exhibition lasted from 25 May until 25 November 1937. The Pavilion was opened but not until July 12, and was located at Avenida del Trocadero near the pavilions of Germany and the Soviet Union.

=== Design ===
The project architect was the philosopher José Gaos, curator of the flag; the painter Josep Renau; and writer Max Aub, who organized the contents of the exhibition pavilion and commissioned the construction of the building to architects Josep Maria Sert and Luis Lacasa. Audiovisual production was by Luis Buñuel, appointed coordinator of the Propaganda the Information Service at the Embassy in Paris.

=== Architecture ===
Sert and Lacasa conceived the building of the Hall of the Republic as an empty container three stories tall. Due to limited time and building materials, many prefabricated panels were used in the creation of the building. The architects also had to adapt to building on an irregular terrain while preserving the trees already on the property. It had an area of 1,400 square meters.

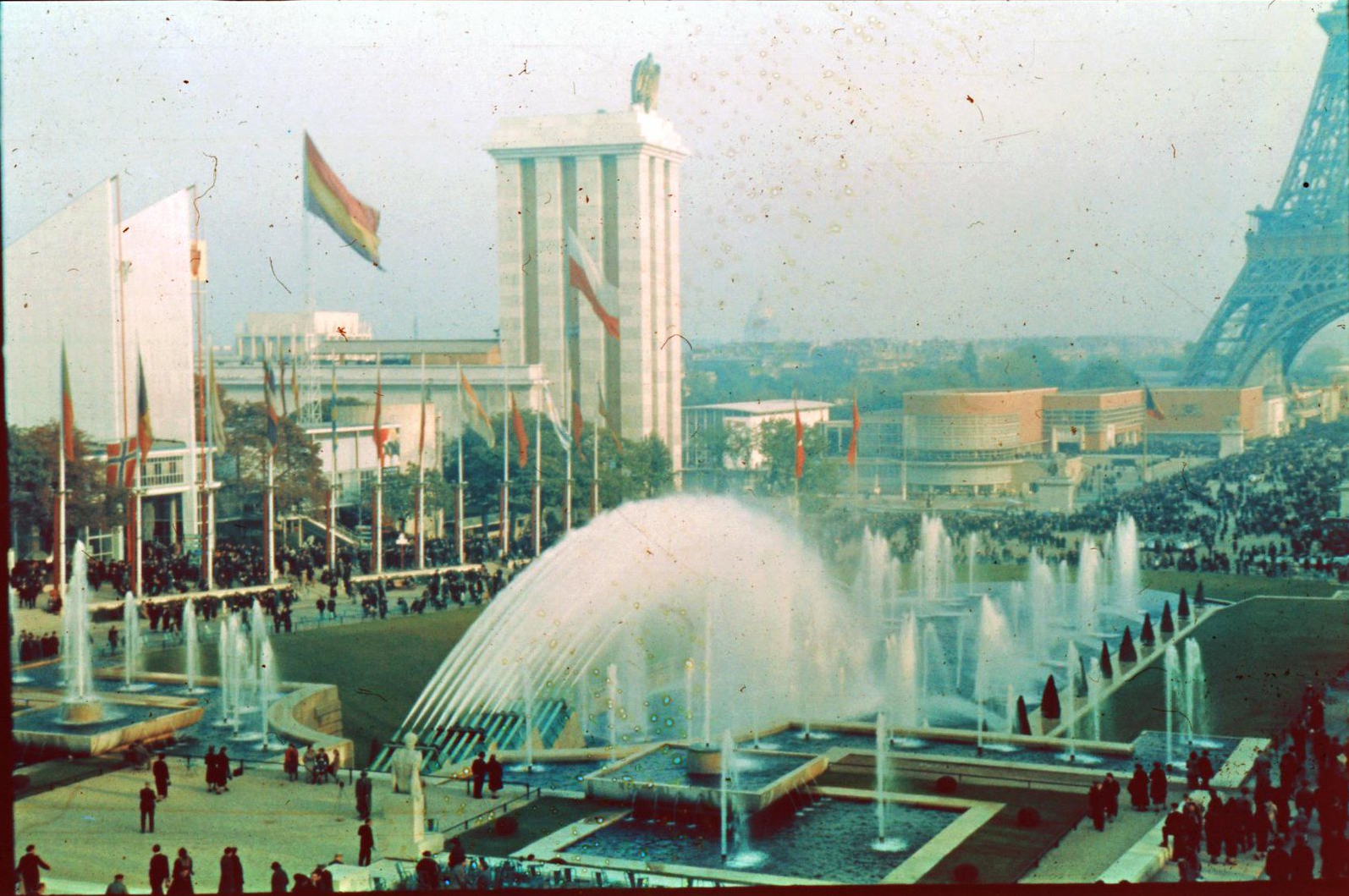
The large flag of the Second Spanish Republic, with horizontal bars of red, yellow, and purple, marking the Spanish Pavilion in Paris during the International Exposition in 1937 (Agfacolor)

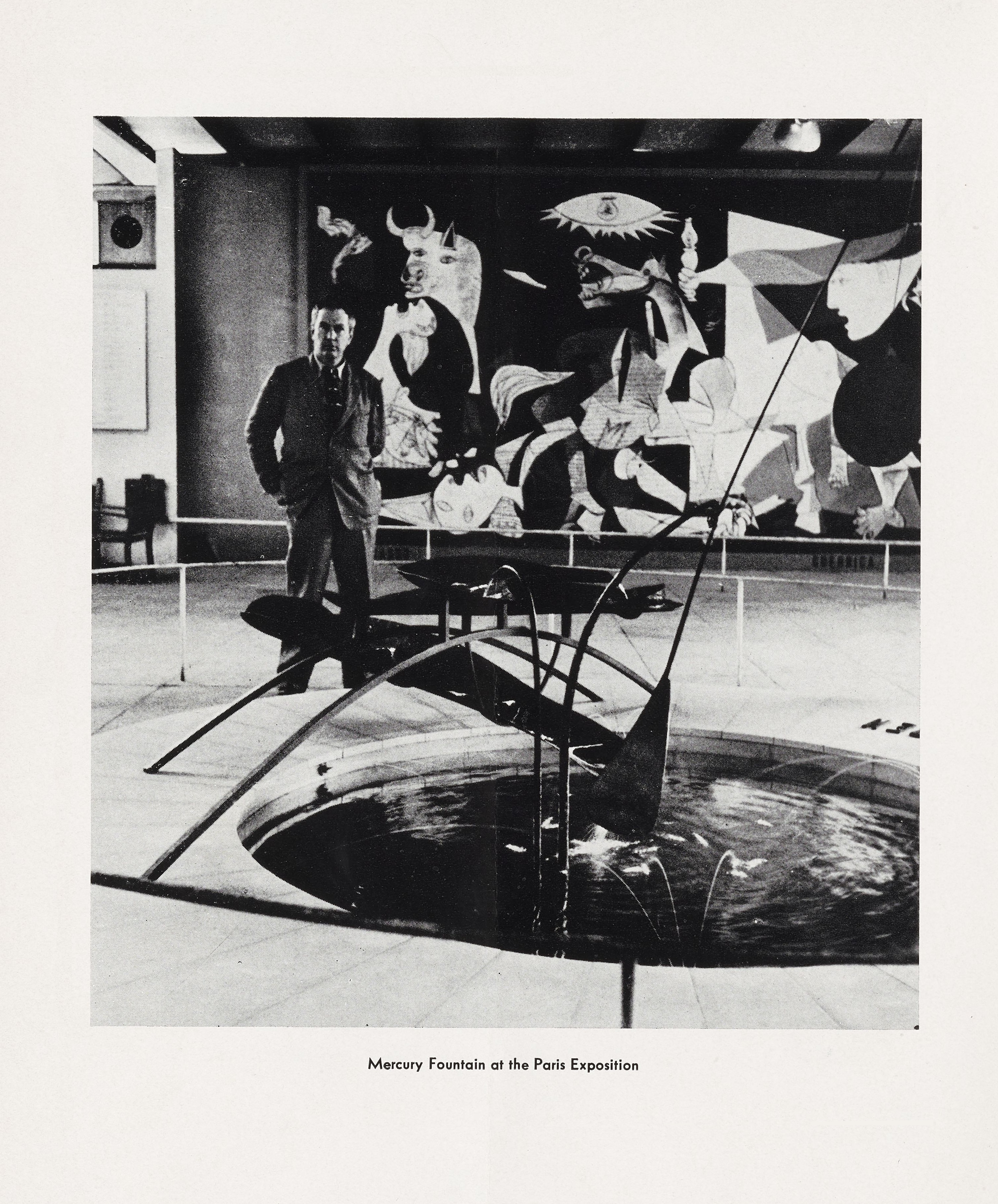
Alexander Calder, pictured with Mercury Fountain and Pablo Picasso's Guernica inside the pavilion in 1937 at the Paris Worlds Fair.

=== Exhibits and collections ===
In the entrance of the building were posters, photographs, photomontages, proclamations, information panels, as well as art and craft sent directly from Spanish central and autonomous governments, as well as various unions.

Many of the exhibits sought to educate how life was before and after the Spanish Republic. The first floor was devoted to information about the ongoing Spanish Civil War, while the second focused on the arts and popular sections.

One of the attractions of the Spanish pavilion was the debut of Pablo Picasso's painting Guernica, the now-famous depiction of the horrors of war. Picasso had been commissioned to created a mural for the Exhibition. The work garnered mixed reviews. A large mural by Joan Miró for the exhibit, entitled The Reaper or Catalan peasant in revolt, was on the second floor. Painted with oil on the building's "celotex" insulation panels, the mural was lost or destroyed a year later after being transferred to Valencia.

A concrete sculpture by Alberto Sánchez Pérez entitled The Spanish people have a path which leads to a star, nearly 11 m tall, was displayed outside. Another sculpture was Alexander Calder's Mercury Fountain.

=== The building replicated in Barcelona in 1992 ===
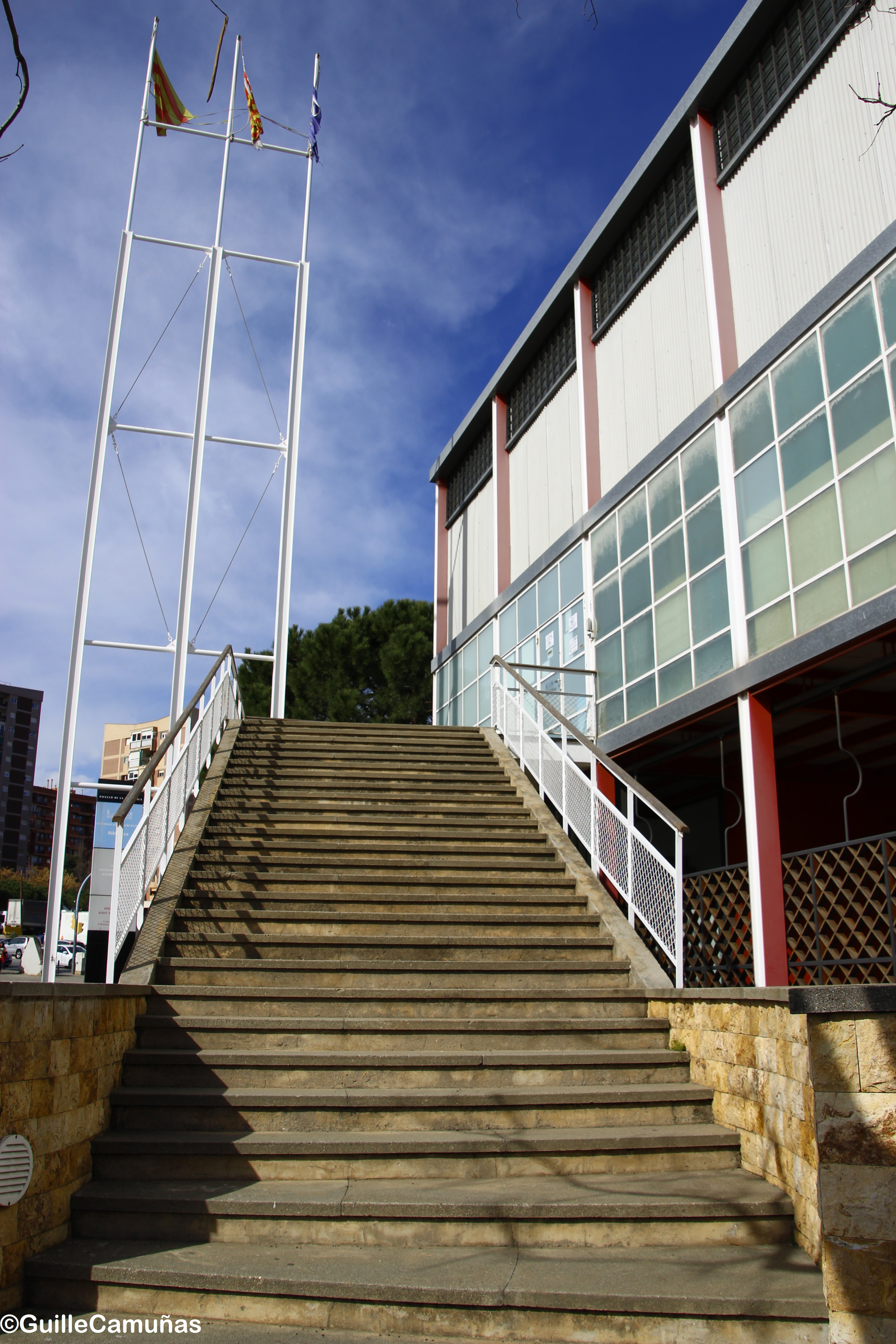
Main entrance

With the Olympic Games of 1992, the City Council commended the architects Antoni Ubach, Juan Miguel Hernández León and Miquel Espinet by gifting them a replica of the Pavilion of the Republic that had been presented at the Paris Exhibition.

A reproduction of Picasso's famous mural Guernica can be seen in its original location, on a wall of the open courtyard of the pavilion. In addition, in 2018 Miró's lost mural The Reaper was reproduced in black and white and placed in its original location of the Pavilion.
