= The Phantom of Liberty =

1974 film by Luis Buñuel

- Theatrical release poster
- French: Le Fantôme de la liberté
- Directed by: Luis Buñuel
- Written by: Luis Buñuel; Jean-Claude Carrière (Note: Collaboration)
- Produced by: Serge Silberman
- Starring: Adriana Asti; Julien Bertheau; Jean-Claude Brialy; Adolfo Celi; Paul Frankeur; Michael Lonsdale; Pierre Maguelon; François Maistre; Hélène Perdrière; Michel Piccoli; Claude Piéplu; Jean Rochefort; Bernard Verley; Milena Vukotic; Monica Vitti
- Cinematography: Edmond Richard
- Edited by: Hélène Plemiannikov
- Production company: Greenwich Film Productions
- Distributed by: 20th Century Fox (France); Euro International Films (Italy)
- Release dates: 11 September 1974 (France); 23 November 1974 (Italy)
- Running time: 104 minutes
- Countries: France; Italy
- Language: French

The Phantom of Liberty (French: Le Fantôme de la liberté) is a 1974 surrealist satirical dark comedy film co-written and directed by Luis Buñuel and produced by Serge Silberman. It stars an ensemble cast consisting of Adriana Asti, Julien Bertheau, Jean-Claude Brialy, Adolfo Celi, Paul Frankeur, Michael Lonsdale, Pierre Maguelon, François Maistre, Hélène Perdrière, Michel Piccoli, Claude Piéplu, Jean Rochefort, Bernard Verley, Milena Vukotic and Monica Vitti.

The film features a nonlinear plot structure that consists of various otherwise unrelated episodes linked only by the movement of certain characters from one situation to another. Overall, the picture exhibits Buñuel's typical ribald satirical humor combined with a series of increasingly outlandish and far-fetched incidents intended to challenge the viewer's pre-conceived notions about the stability of social mores and reality. The Phantom of Liberty was critically acclaimed and is considered to be one of Buñuel's best films.

== Plot ==
In 1808, (Note: The opening scene is inspired by "The Kiss", a short story by Spanish post-Romanticist writer Gustavo Adolfo Bécquer, and by Francisco Goya's painting The Third of May 1808.) during the Napoleonic occupation of Toledo, a firing squad executes a small group of Spanish rebels who cry out "Long live chains!" The French troops are encamped in a Catholic church, where the captain caresses the statue of a noblewoman and is knocked unconscious by the statue of her husband. In revenge, the captain exhumes the noblewoman's corpse to find her face remains intact, intending to commit necrophilia.

In a modern-day Parisian park, a suspicious-looking man gives two young girls a set of pictures, while their nannies are reading about the 1808 events. At home, one of the girls shows the pictures to her parents, Mr. and Mrs. Foucauld. The parents are appalled yet sexually aroused by the pictures, which turn out to be postcards depicting French landmarks. The parents fire their nanny. That night, Mr. Foucauld cannot sleep due to a series of visitations in his bedroom: a rooster, a postman delivering a letter, and an Emu.

Mr. Foucauld's doctor dismisses these nocturnal apparitions as dreams, even though Foucauld presents the postman's letter as evidence. They are interrupted by the doctor's nurse, who announces she must visit her ailing father. On the drive, the nurse is told by a group of soldiers hunting foxes that the road ahead is blocked. Checking into a local inn, she befriends a group of Carmelite friars who engage her in a game of poker while smoking and drinking.

A young man and his elderly aunt check into the inn to consummate an incestuous affair. When the nephew exposes the aunt's naked body, she has the body of a young woman. As the aunt refuses the nephew's sexual advances, he smothers her with a pillow and then leaves the room. The nephew, the nurse, and the friars are all invited for a drink in the room of a hatter and his female assistant. The assistant dons a dominatrix outfit and proceeds to whip the hatter, who is wearing bottomless trousers, in front of the other guests, who are shocked and leave. The nephew returns to his aunt, who is alive and has agreed to have sex with him.

The following day, the nurse leaves for Argenton, giving a lift to a professor who gives a lecture to a classroom of policemen who behave like unruly schoolchildren. The lecture is constantly interrupted until only two officers are left. To illustrate a point he is making about the relativity of customs and laws, the professor recounts a dinner party he once attended at his friends' house, where the guests sat around the table on flushing toilets.

The two policemen go on duty and stop a speeding motorist, Mr. Legendre, who is rushing to see his doctor in Paris. Mr. Legendre is diagnosed with cancer but is offered a cigarette by his doctor, whom he slaps. At home, Mr. and Mrs. Legendre are notified that their daughter has disappeared from school, only to find her in class. Although the parents are able to see and speak to her, no one acknowledges the girl's presence. The parents bring her along to report her "disappearance" to the police, who likewise fail to acknowledge the girl's presence.

The policeman assigned to find the "missing" girl has his shoes shined. Sitting next to him is a sniper who goes to the top of Paris's Tour Montparnasse and randomly shoots people in the streets below. He is arrested, found guilty, and sentenced to death but ultimately leaves the courtroom and is treated like a celebrity.

The Prefect of Police, who returns the "missing" girl, meets a woman in a bar who resembles his deceased sister. He receives a telephone call from his deceased sister, asking him to meet her at the mausoleum. Entering his family's crypt, he finds a telephone beside his sister's coffin. He is suddenly arrested for desecration by officers who refuse to believe he is the Prefect of Police.

The Prefect is taken to his office, where a different man has taken his place. The two men treat each other cordially as if they are acquainted. The two police chiefs arrive at a zoo and jointly direct police control of an off-screen riot. A voice is heard crying out "Long live chains!"

== Cast ==
- Adriana Asti as the lady in black / the Prefect of Police's sister
- Julien Bertheau as the first Prefect of Police
- Jean-Claude Brialy as Mr. Foucauld
- Adolfo Celi as Dr. Pierre Pasolini
- Paul Frankeur as the innkeeper
- Michael Lonsdale as Jean Bermans, the hatter
- Pierre Maguelon as Gérard, a policeman
- François Maistre as the professor
- Hélène Perdrière as the aunt
- Michel Piccoli as the second Prefect of Police
- Claude Piéplu as the commissaire de police
- Jean Rochefort as Mr. Legendre
- Bernard Verley as the captain
- Milena Vukotic as the nurse
- Monica Vitti as Mrs. Foucauld
- Philippe Brigaud as the man with the pictures
- Anne-Marie Deschodt as Édith Rosenblum, Jean's assistant
- Paul Le Person as Gabriel, a friar
- Pierre Lary as the sniper
- Guy Montagné (credited as Gilbert Montagné) as the young friar
- Bernard Musson as a friar
- Marcel Pérès as the old friar
- Marie-France Pisier as Mrs. Calmette
- Pierre-François Pistorio as François de Richemont, the nephew
- André Rouyer as the brigadier
- Chantal Ladesou as the young woman who passes the toilet paper (uncredited)

== Historical and social context ==
The Phantom of Liberty was Buñuel's penultimate film. At the time of production, he was 74 years old and considering retirement. Buñuel summarizes many of the concerns that permeate his work:

Chance governs all things; necessity, which is far from having the same purity, comes only later. If I have a soft spot for any one of my movies, it would be for The Phantom of Liberty, because it tries to work out just this theme.

The film contains short incidents and scenarios collected from throughout Buñuel's life, arranged in the style of a surreal game where seemingly disconnected ideas are linked by chance encounters. Writer Gary Indiana notes that the film was written by Buñuel and Carrière "telling each other their dreams every morning."

The film is infused with his personal experience. It opens in Toledo, Spain, a city that so impressed the young Buñuel that in 1923, he founded a group called the Order of Toledo. When he was a student in Madrid, he saw a dead woman's hair 'growing' from a tomb in the moonlight. The sight made a strong impression on him and he used it in this film some fifty years later. In the 1940s, when he lived in Los Angeles but had no prospects of film work, he wrote down an idea about a missing girl whose parents fruitlessly search for her while she is beside them; invisible and yet not invisible. When the Carmelite says "If everyone prayed every day to Saint Joseph, peace and quiet would prevail", this was a quote that had stuck with Buñuel when he was visiting a monastery in the 1960s. One of the most poignant biographical details used in The Phantom of Liberty is the sequence when the doctor tries to avoid telling his patient that he has cancer of the liver. This was based on Buñuel's experience of being told that he had a cyst on his liver (he died of cancer of the liver in 1983).

The title of the film is a homage to Karl Marx and Friedrich Engels’ Communist Manifesto, specifically a reference to the opening sentence: "A spectre is haunting Europe – the spectre of Communism" (in French, "spectre" is translated as fantôme). This sentence refers to the way in which the idea of Communism was being used pejoratively by the authorities in the mid-19th century to attack all political parties opposed to the established order (church, aristocracy and state). The Communist Manifesto was written to offer a positive vision of the views, aims and tendencies of Communists from across Europe. Buñuel and the Surrealists were closely linked to the Communists in the 1930s, but by the 1950s he had developed a greater antipathy towards the party.

The title of The Phantom of Liberty is also taken from this line of dialogue from his 1969 film The Milky Way: "I experience in every event that my thoughts and my will are not in my power. And that my liberty is only a phantom." It likely refers to the illusive nature of freedom, to the ways in which our destinies are controlled by chance, or, as Buñuel would have it:

We so often find ourselves at complicated crossroads which lead to other crossroads, to ever more fantastic labyrinths. Somehow we must choose a path.

This quote not only parallels the structure of the film but also summarizes Buñuel's philosophy of life. After being awarded an Oscar for Best Foreign Language Film in the previous year (for The Discreet Charm of the Bourgeoisie, also with producer Serge Silberman and writer Jean-Claude Carriere), he appears to have regained the creative autonomy of his early films. The Phantom of Liberty can therefore be seen as a personal film from a director reflecting back on a long creative career.

== Themes ==
Buñuel outlines the film's themes in his autobiography as being:

- The search for truth and the need to abandon the truth as soon as you have found it.
- The implacable nature of social rituals.
- The importance of coincidence.
- The importance of personal morality.
- The essential mystery of all things.

== Home media ==
In Spain, The Phantom of Liberty was released on Blu-ray by A Contracorriente Films on 19 September 2017.

In January 2021, The Phantom of Liberty was released as part of the Three-film Collection by The Criterion Collection with The Discreet Charm of the Bourgeoisie and That Obscure Object of Desire being the other two.

StudioCanal released the film on Blu-ray in France on 1 January 2021.

A DigiPack for The Phantom of Liberty is still in the works from The Criterion Collection for the U.S. and Canadian distribution.

== Reception ==
Buñuel's previous production, The Discreet Charm of the Bourgeoisie (1972), had won the Academy Award for Best Foreign Language Film, and his next and final film, That Obscure Object of Desire (1977) was a more conventional narrative. Below is a selection of critical comments on the film:

Like Discreet Charm, the plot-free Phantom of Liberty is a patchwork of comedic sketches and sight gags through which Buñuel ravages a complacent European culture and the various sexual hang-ups and historical and cultural disconnects of its inhabitants. The surrealist images range from the profane to the comical, from the absurd to the rational, and from the ambiguous to the idiotic. This heady, almost off-putting masterwork isn't particularly easy to decipher (maybe we aren't meant to), which is why it's best to approach it as a literal comedy of manners.

— Ed Gonzalez, Slant Magazine

The Phantom of Liberty is one of the most audacious and unconventional films in cinema history. Directed by Luis Buñuel, The Phantom of Liberty may very well be the most accomplished, ambitious and surrealist work of his 54-year film career. Indeed, this is a film that deals with a variety of transgressive subjects such as fetishism, necrophilia, incest, mass murder, sadomasochism, and pedophilia with a network of storytelling devices and narrative forms and presents an intense criticism against established social institutions. It is a complex, paradoxical, subversive and radical film, which has promoted endless debates and encouraged a variety of readings.

— Marco Lanzagorta, Senses of Cinema

Le Fantôme de la Liberté is dozens of stories that lead from one to another with a dreamlike logic, and a dream-like way of never quite arriving at a neatly satisfactory conclusion. It is not for people who see movies as butterflies, trophies to be netted, pinned down, then pulled apart with tweezers. The movie can't be pinned down. There's no single correct way to read it, which is not a rationale for its ambiguities, but a rigorous instruction to those who would enjoy all that is most marvelous and poetic in surrealism at its best.

— Vincent Canby, New York Times

The film was nominated for Best Foreign Language Film by the U.S. National Board of Review.

Today, The Phantom of Liberty is one of Buñuel's most acclaimed works. On the website Rotten Tomatoes, the film holds an approval rating of 85% based on 26 critics, with an average rating of 8.4/10.
