= Plaza de las Cuatro Calles, Toledo =

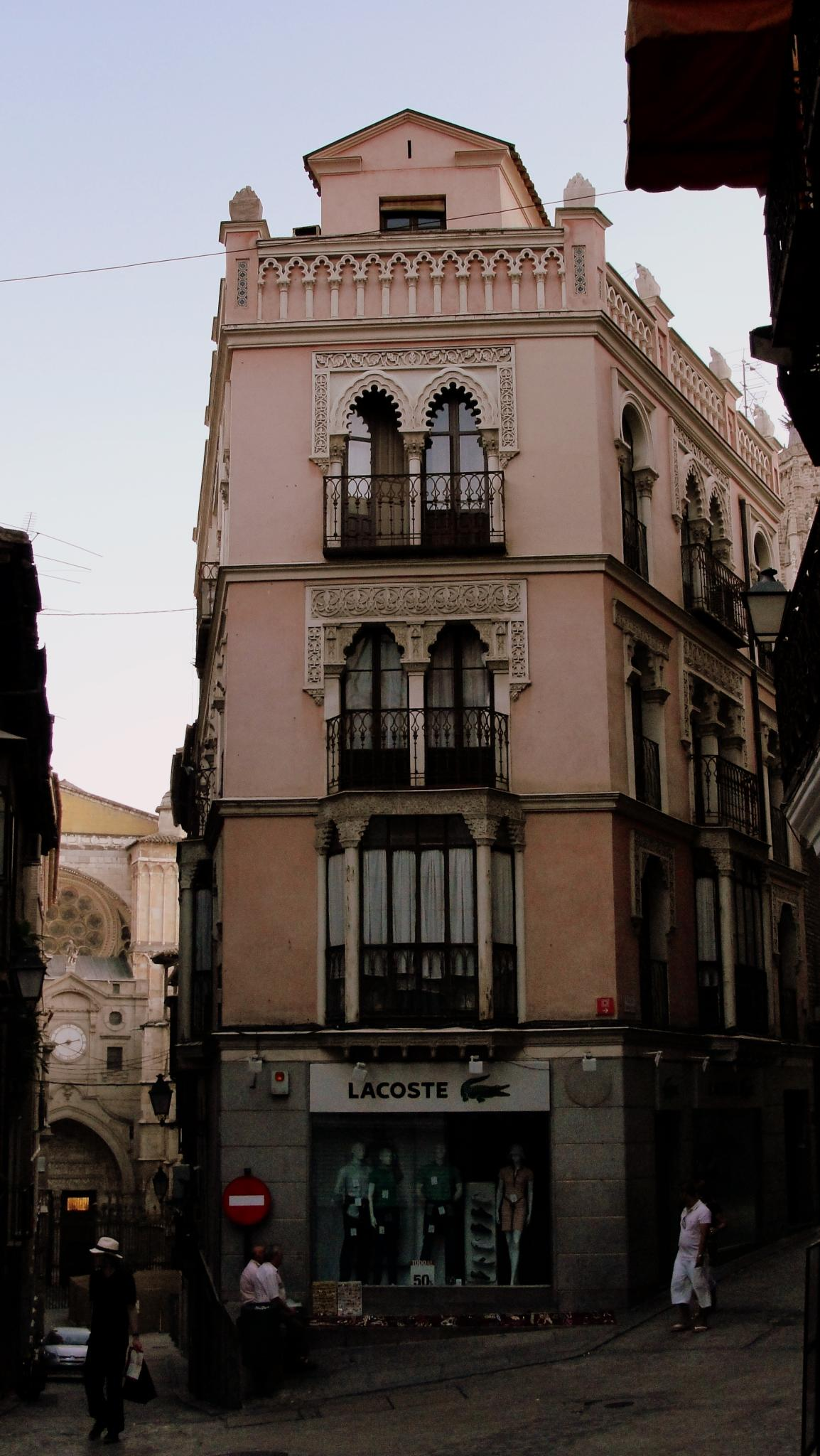
Plaza de las Cuatro Calles

The Plaza de las Cuatro Calles is a square located in the city of Toledo, in Castile-La Mancha, Spain. This square is the commercial heart of Toledo.

Is the center of a five-armed star from which it reaches Zocodover by the north, the Cathedral by the south, the Teatro Rojas by the east and the Alcaná by the west.

== In popular culture ==
The plaza is mentioned in chapter 9 of Don Quixote, in Lazarillo de Tormes, and in El Audaz (novel).
