= The Reaper (Miró) =

1937 mural by Joan Miró

The Reaper ("El segador"), also known as Catalan peasant in revolt ("El campesino catalán en rebeldía" (es); "El pagès català en rebel·lia" (ca)) was a large mural created by Joan Miró in Paris in 1937 for the Spanish Republic’s pavilion at the 1937 Paris International Exhibition. One of Miró's largest works (5.5 metres (18 ft) high), it was destroyed or lost in 1938, and only a few black and white photographs survive.

== Background ==
Miró moved with his family to Paris in 1936 to escape the Spanish Civil War. Until 1937 Miró had maintained a mostly apolitical stance, but he had Republican sympathies, and the mural was intended as a protest against the violence wracking his home country. He had created a stamp and poster, Aidez l'Espagne, earlier in 1937, which depicted a Catalan peasant wearing a traditional red hat (barretina) and shaking his fist.

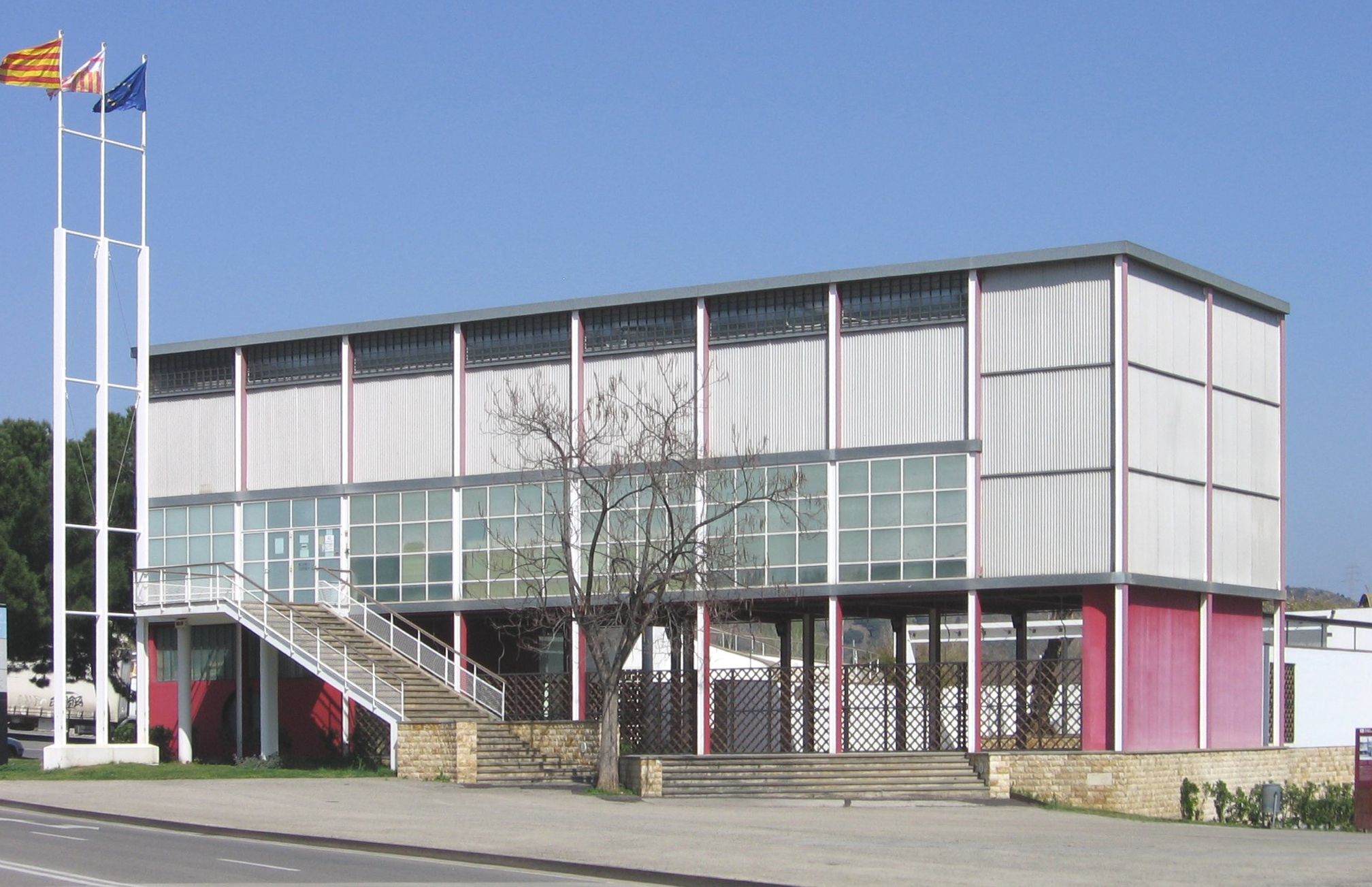
Replica (built in Barcelona in 1992) of the pavilion of the Spanish Republic at the 1937 Paris International Exhibition.

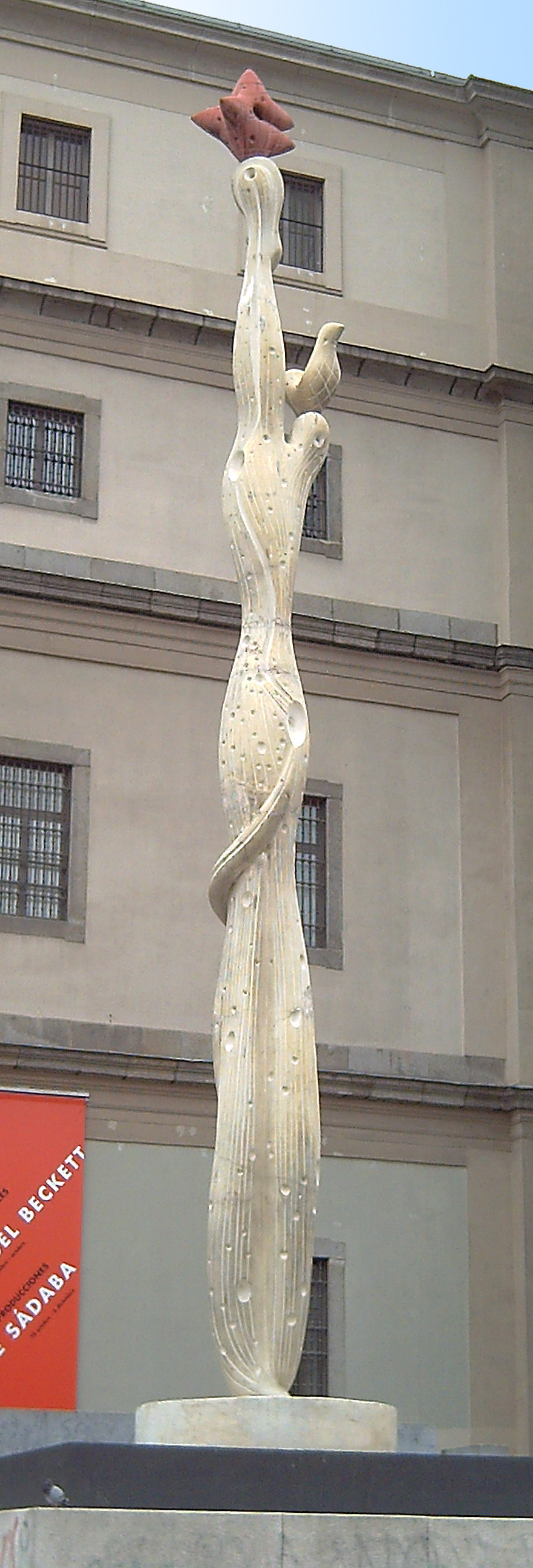
Replica outside the Reina Sofia Museum in Madrid of Alberto Sánchez Pérez's The Spanish people have a path that leads to a star

The Spanish pavilion was built next to the German pavilion, and was a modern design by Spanish architects Josep Lluís Sert (a student of Le Corbusier) and Luis Lacasa Navarro. It was a two-story steel and glass box, in red and brown, floating over a ground floor. Numerous paintings and sculptures by Spanish artists were displayed inside. A concrete sculpture by Alberto Sánchez Pérez, El pueblo español tiene un camino que conduce a una estrella ("The Spanish people have a path which leads to a star") was displayed outside, while Alexander Calder's Mercury Fountain and Pablo Picasso's Guernica were on display on the ground floor.

== Painting ==
Miró painted his mural in June 1937, directly onto six 6 feet (1.8 m) square celotex insulation panels forming part of the structure of the pavilion. It was situated at the end of a double-height open space with a stairway, and was visible from two floors. The work depicts a Catalan peasant wearing a barretina hat —symbol of Catalan identity— and holding up a sickle, sometimes misinterpreted by some as an explicitly Communist symbol but intended by Miró simply as the peasant's traditional agricultural implement and improvised weapon. The peasant's other hand makes the Republican clenched fist salute, and his face was contorted into a cry of despair.

The peasant had been used as a symbol of Catalan nationalism since the 17th century, and was a theme in Miró's work since the 1920s. Sert said in 1968 that Miró's work was inspired by a Catalan song, "Els Segadors" (The Reapers), which eventually became Catalonia's national anthem.

The exhibition closed in November 1937, and the mural was dismantled along with the rest of the pavilion in early 1938. Miró donated the mural to the Spanish government, and the six panels were packed to be transported to the Ministry of Fine Arts in Valencia. The mural was subsequently lost or destroyed, although other works by Miró on Celotex from 1937 survive. Miró did not seem particularly concerned about the loss of his work, perhaps because it was overshadowed in the pavilion by Picasso's Guernica.

The mural survives only in a few surviving black and white photographs. It was mainly black (the peasant's chin, cheek, eye, ear, teeth, left arm, body, teeth), white (his face, nose, neck) and shades of red (cap, nose, cheek, neck, right arm). The background was green, blue, and yellow, and included a blue star and some exposed buff of the celotex ground.

I painted on a scaffolding directly in the very space of the building. I first made a few light sketches to know vaguely what I needed to do, but… the execution of this work was direct and brutal.

— Joan Miró,
