= Edificio Rockefeller =

Academic building in Madrid, Spain

Coordinates: 40.4417°N 3.6881°W

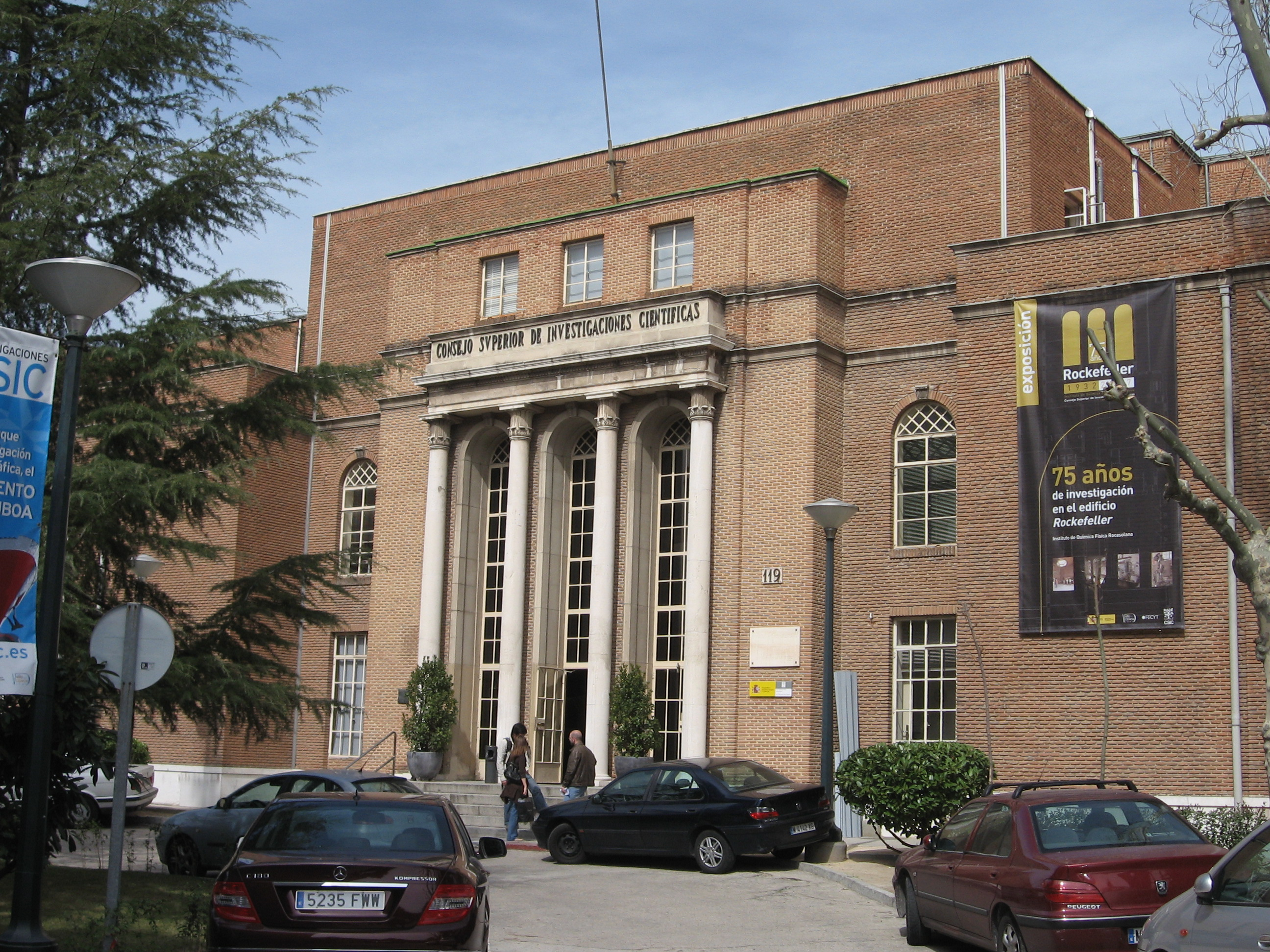
- Interactive map of the Edificio Rockefeller area

General information
- Status: Completed
- Opening: 1932

Edificio Rockefeller (literally Rockefeller Building) is the popular name of a building in Madrid, Spain that is headquarters of Instituto Nacional de Física y Química (National Institute of Physics and Chemistry). Opened in 1932, Edificio Rockefeller is located within the central campus of the CSIC (Consejo Superior de Investigaciones Científicas),

According to architects Manuel Sánchez Arcas and Luis Lacasa, the building was named Edificio Rockefeller because the Rockefeller Foundation in the United States funded its construction and equipment. The architects were selected to bring to the building the new principles of rationalist functionalism.

Edificio Rockefeller owes its historical reputation for the work performed there until the Spanish Civil War. Some of the most important physical and chemical scientists in Spanish history Blas Cabrera, Miguel A. Catalán and Enrique Moles, were part of this first Spanish school of physics and physical chemistry.
