= Charlotte Julian =

French actress and singer

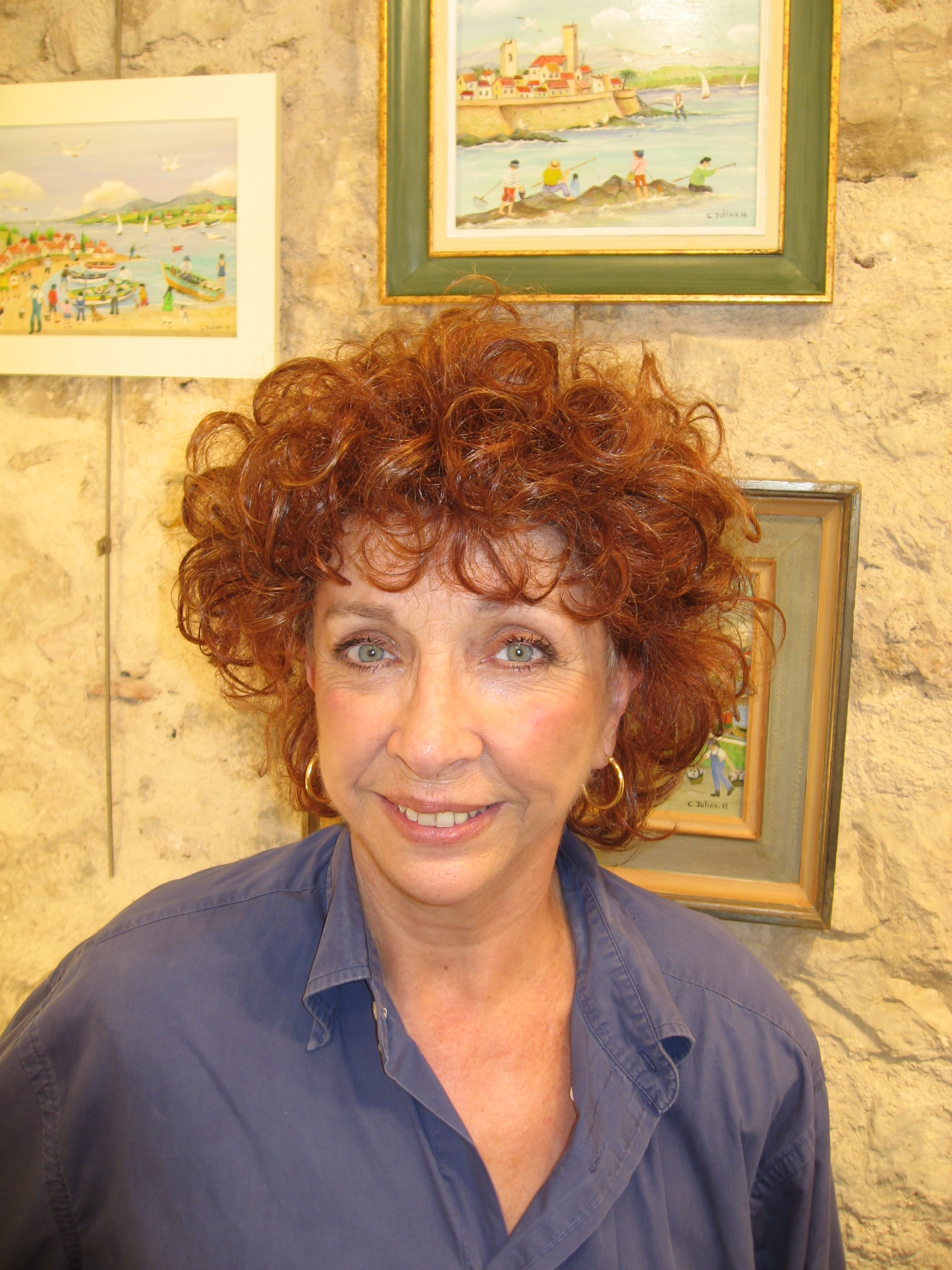

Charlotte Julian is a French actress, singer and painter.

Her career began in the 1970s and she is known for songs including Fleur de province, Tout le monde à la campagne and Zoubida.

== Early life and education ==
Originally from Perpignan, Julian studied at its art school. At a young age she wanted to become a singer and actor, deciding to move to Paris to pursue her career.

== Career ==
In 1969, Julian appeared on the television show Le Petit Conservatoire de la chanson featuring Mireille Hartuch under the name 'Nicole Perpignan'. After meeting producer Jean-Max Rivière she recorded Fleur de province.

She appeared alongside Patrick Bruel and Fabrice Luchini in P.R.O.F.S, a 1985 film directed by Patrick Schulmann.

She has also sang and acted in theatre productions, including Le Plus Beau Métier du monde, La Puce à l'oreille, Âge tendre, la tournée des idoles and Belle-maman monte à Paris.

=== Painting ===
Julian is also a painter in the naive style and exhibits regularly in galleries in France and abroad.

=== Activism ===
Julian is the patron of the Association France Cancer.
