= Étienne Draber =

French actor (1939–2021)

- Born: 26 March 1939; Strasbourg, France
- Died: 11 January 2021 (aged 81); Paris, France
- Occupation: Actor

Étienne Draber (26 March 1939 – 11 January 2021) was a French actor.

== Biography ==
Draber studied at CNSAD and worked alongside Michel Favory and Jean-Louis Barrault in the 1960s. The father of actress Stéphanie Bataille, In the 1980s, Draber frequently appeared in French films. He acted in films such as Profs, The Under-Gifted, May Fools, and Ridicule.

Draber also appeared in television series. He played the role of Monsieur Grand-Coin du Toit in the 1994 sitcom Le Miel et les Abeilles. His most successful series appearance occurred in 2008 with Plus belle la vie.

Étienne Draber died of COVID-19 in Paris on 11 January 2021, at the age of 81, during the COVID-19 pandemic in France.

== Filmography ==
=== Cinema ===
- Les Baratineurs (1965)
- Sexyrella (1968)
- La Grande Maffia (1971)
- The Inheritor (1973)
- Cher Victor (1975)
- 7 morts sur ordonnancee (1975)
- Le Plein de Super (1976)
- Un oursin dans la poche (1977)
- Le Sucre (1978)
- La Frisée aux lardons (1978)
- Les Grandissons (1978)
- Et la tendresse ? Bordel ! (1978)
- Les Charlots en délire (1979)
- Les Turlupins (1979)
- Gros-Câlin (1979)
- Rendez-moi ma peau... (1980)
- Je vais craquer (1980)
- The Under-Gifted (1980)
- Diva (1981)
- Faut s'les faire ces légionnaires (1981)
- Boulevard des assassins (1982)
- Un dimanche de flic (1983)
- Signes extérieurs de richesse (1983)
- Le Fou du roi (1983)
- Le Bon Plaisir (1984)
- Les Brésiliennes du bois de Boulogne (1984)
- Profs (1985)
- Les Rois du gag (1985)
- Y'a pas le feu... (1985)
- Un amour à Paris (1986)
- La Passion de Bernadette (1989)
- May Fools (1990)
- Madame Bovary (1991)
- Les Ténors (1993)
- Pétain (1993)
- Les Grands Ducs (1995)
- Beaumarchais (1995)
- Ridicule (1996)
- Les Bidochon (1996)
- On Guard (1997)
- Al limite (1997)
- Épouse-moi (2000)
- T'aime (2000)
- Rue des plaisirs (2001)
- Sept ans de mariage (2002)
- Vipère au poing (2004)
- House of D (2004)
- My Best Friend (2006)
- Coco (2009)
- L'amour, c'est mieux à deux (2010)
- J'ai perdu Albert (2018)

=== Short films ===
- La Flache (1995)
- Zanzibar (1998)
- La Place du mort (1999)
- Les Fourches caudines (1999)
- Drame ordinaire (1999)
- William sort de prison (2000)
- Les Couilles de mon chat (2004)

=== Television ===
- Les Jeunes Années (1965)
- Cinéma 16 : L'Œil de l'autre (1977)
- Louis XI ou Le pouvoir central(1979)
- L'embrumé (1980)
- Petit déjeuner compris (1980)
- Le Mandarin (1980)
- Arsène Lupin joue et perd (1980)
- Commissaire Moulin (1982)
- Le rêve d'Icare (1982)
- Le village dans les nuages (1982)
- Mariage blues (1983)
- Battling le ténébreux (1984)
- Châteauvallon (1985)
- Les Cing Dernières Minutes (1985)
- Marie Pervenche (1987)
- Les grandes familles (1988)
- Nick chasseur de têtes (1989)
- Cas de divorce (1991)
- Le gourou occidental (1991)
- La squale (1991)
- Regarde-moi quand je te quitte (1993)
- Le Miel et les Abeilles (1994)
- François Kléber (1995)
- Maigret (1995)
- Une fille à papas (1996)
- L'École des passions (1996)
- Sapho (1996)
- Studio des Artistes (1997)
- Juge et partie (1997)
- La traque (1997)
- Madame le Proviseur (1998)
- Island détectives (1999)
- H (1999)
- Louis Page (2001)
- Les Cordier, juge et flic (2001)
- Le juge est une femme (2002)
- La mort est rousse (2002)
- Courrier du cœur (2003)
- La Crim' (2004)
- Quai numéro un (2004)
- SOS 18 (2005)
- Voltaire et l'affaire Calas (2007)
- Fargas (2007)
- Plus belle la vie (2008)
- La Minute vieille (2015)
