= Order of Toledo =

Artist collective based in Madrid

The Order of Toledo
- Formation: 1923
- Headquarters: Madrid

The Order of Toledo was an avant-garde association of young writers and artists studying in Madrid, Spain, who made frequent weekend trips to nearby Toledo. Members immersed themselves in the mystique of the city's labyrinthine streets and mosaic history to seek out individual and shared adventures. The Order was founded by Luis Buñuel in 1923 and continued accepting members until 1936. Some of its most successful members were Salvador Dalí, Federico García Lorca, and Rafael Alberti.

== Origins ==
According to his memoirs, Buñuel first visited Toledo in 1921 and was immediately smitten with its “indescribable ambience.” He would often return to the city with friends from the Residencia de Estudiantes de la Calle Pinar in Madrid for weekend getaways. In 1923, after a tipsy night in the taverns of Toledo, he was inspired to formalize the impromptu visits:

I passed into the cloister of the Cathedral, completely drunk, when, suddenly, I heard thousands of birds singing and something told me that I should enter immediately into the Carmelites, not to become a monk, but rather to rob the convent box. I went to the monastery, the doorman opened the door, and in came a monk. I told him of my sudden and fervent desire to become a Carmelite. Without a doubt noting the aroma of wine, he saw me to the door. The next day I made the decision to found the Order of Toledo.

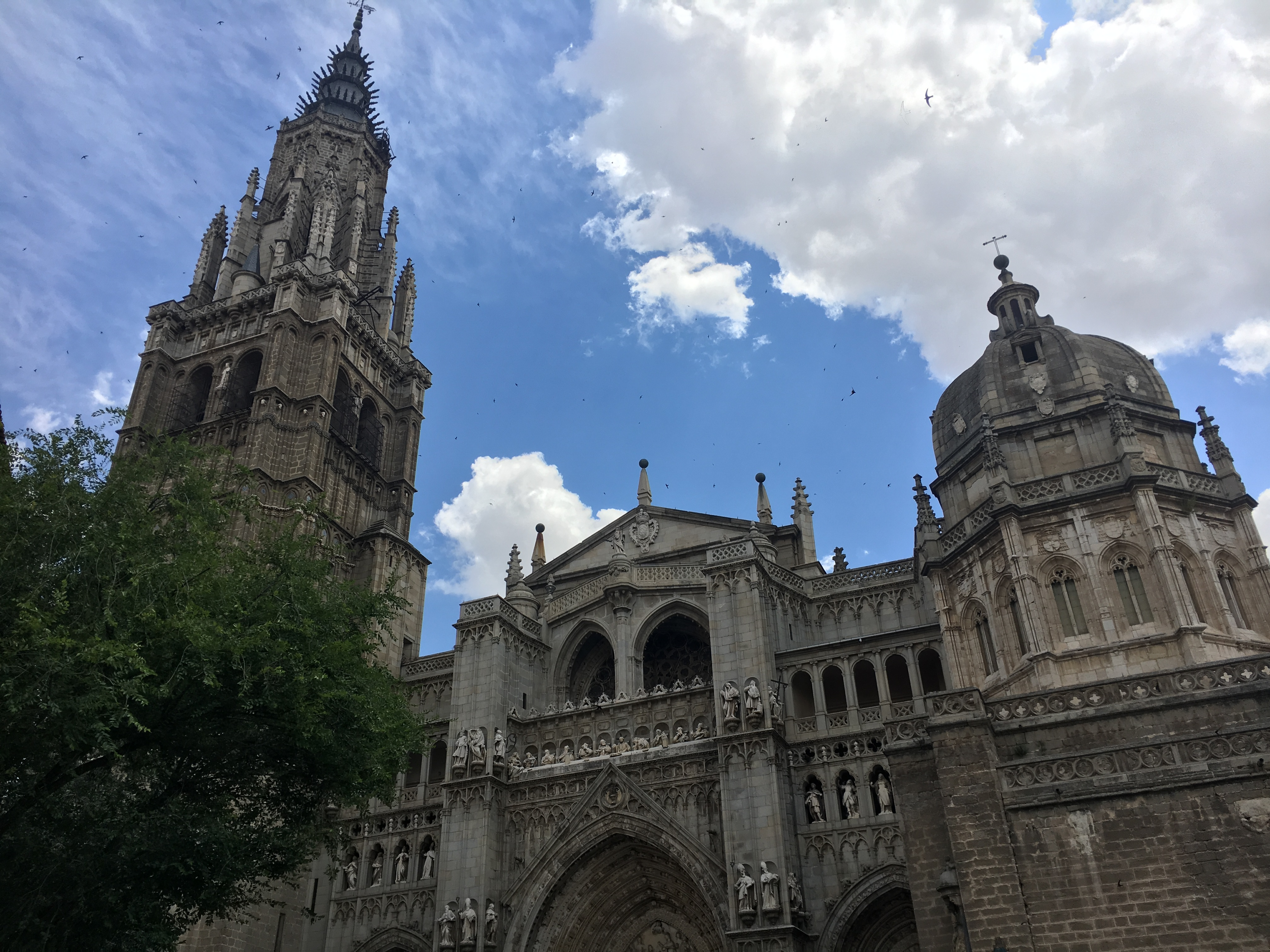
Cathedral of Toledo

The primary purpose of the Order was to wander in search of personal adventures. Prospective members were initiated at the cathedral's toll of 1 o’clock in the morning, at which point they were stranded in the darkness of Toledo. In his memoirs, Rafael Alberti recounts his initiation experience. He was brought to the Plaza of Santo Domingo el Real near a monastery. The other members appeared, one by one, covered in white sheets, “phantoms of another era, in the quiet unreality of the Toledan penumbra.” Then Alberti was abandoned until dawn, left to traverse Toledo in the hours when the city “seems to stretch out, becoming even more complicated in its phantasmagoric and silent labyrinth.”

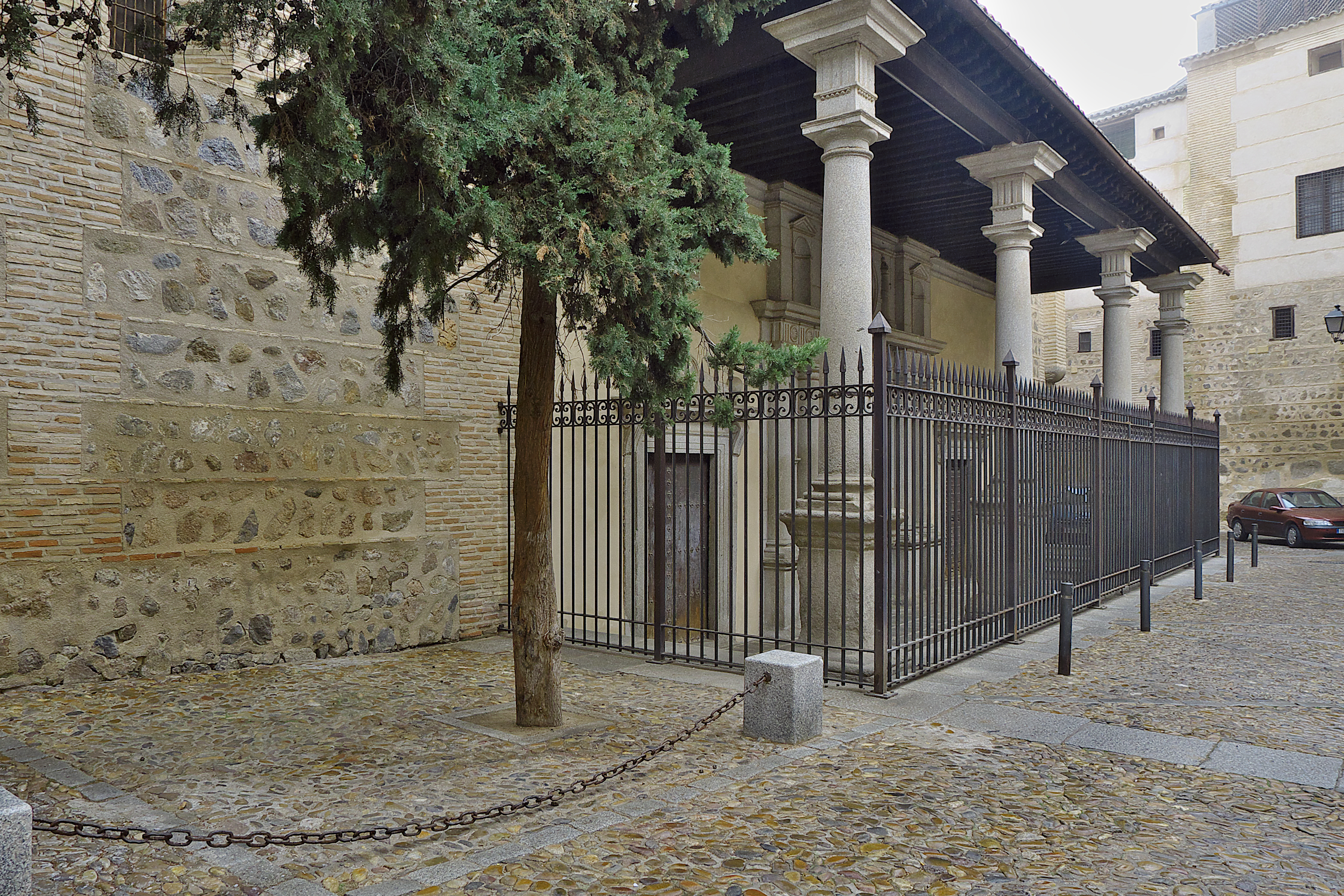
Monastery of Santo Domingo el Real

This idea of wandering, as if caught between consciousness and unconsciousness, was integral to the origins of the Order. Its members were enchanted and inspired by the city to find all that was intriguing and confusing and mesmerizing.

== Membership ==
The following were members:

Constable: Luis Buñuel

Secretary: Pepín Bello

Founding Knights: Pedro Garfias, Augusto Centeno, José Uzelay, Sánchez Ventura, Federico García Lorca, Francisco (Paco) García Lorca, Ernestina González

Knights: Hernando y Lulu Viñes, Rafael Alberti, José Barradas, Gustavo Durán, Eduardo Ugarte, Jeanne Rucar, Monique Lacombe, Margarita Manso, María Luisa González, Ricardo Urgoiti, Antonio G. Solalinde, Salvador Dalí, José M. Hinojosa, María Teresa León, René Crével, Pierre Unik

Squires: Georges Sadoul, Roger Désormière, Colette Steinlen, Eli Lotar, Aliette Legendre, Madeleine Chantal, Delia del Carril, Helene Tasnon, Carmina Castillo Manso, Nuñez, Mondolot, Norah Sadoul, Manolo A. Ortiz, Ana María Custodio

Chief of the Invites of the Squires: José Moreno Villa

Invites of the Squires: Luis Lacasa, Rubio Sacristán, Julio Bayona, Carlos Castillo G. Negrete

Invites of the Invites of the Squires: Juan Vicens, Marcelino Pascua

== Rules ==
Belying its nominal suggestion of a formal political, religious, or military association, the Order was in practice an outlet for youthful spontaneity and unbounded exploration. However, in its own bohemian fashion, the Order had some strict rules, catalogued in a retrospective account by Buñuel:

- Every member had to set forth 10 pesetas for the common cash box—that is to say, pay me 10 pesetas for lodging and food.
- Every member had to go to Toledo as frequently as possible and ready themselves to live the most unforgettable experiences.
- The inn in which we stayed, far away from conventional hotels, was almost always the Posada de la Sangre, where Cervantes set La ilustre fregona. The inn had scarcely changed from those times: donkeys in the corral, dirty sheets, and students. Of course, no running water.
- The members of the Order were prohibited from washing during their stay in the holy city.
- We almost always ate in cheap bars, like the Venta de Aires, outside, where we were always ordering tortilla a caballo (with pork meat) and a partridge and white wine from Yepes.
- When returning, on foot, we made the necessary trip to the tomb of Cardinal Tavera, sculpted by Berruguete. A few minutes of reflection behind the reclining sculpture of the Cardinal, a corpse of stone, with pale, sunken cheeks, captured by the sculptor one or two hours before the putrefaction.
- To attain the rank of knight, one had to:
  - Love Toledo without reserve
  - Get drunk for at least one full night
  - Wander throughout the streets
- Those who preferred to get up early were ineligible for any position above that of squire.

== Relation of the Order to the City of Toledo ==
It was the mystique of Toledo that inspired the Order and that kept the members coming back, not just for the duration of the Order, but for the rest of their lives. Toledo is a city with a long and sinuous history dating back to Antiquity. It has served as the main venue for councils of the Holy Roman Empire and as the capital of Spain. Its renowned co-existence of Christians, Muslims, and Jews is a testament to the cultural fecundity of the city. After the capital moved to Madrid in the 16th century, Toledo lost much of its former renown. In the Romantic period, Toledo was re-discovered and became an increasingly popular destination for travelers.

Romantic pictorial representations by El Greco and the literary representations by Bécquer were foundational to the perspective of the Order. Alberti mentions in the account of his initiation how the churches of the Plaza de Santo Domingo el Real “at night seem as if they are descended from some cloudy and mysterious firmament of El Greco.” The moment is indicative of a surrealist twist to the Order—waking and dreaming both within and outside of one's own consciousness. Bécquer had been fascinated by Toledo in the 19th century and made a routine of returning there to write and ideate. He loved the “urban singularity, special compendium and synthesis of multiple cultures, the mystery that pervaded its ancient and labyrinthine streets, at the margin of progress.” The city was a kind of living, breathing ruins—a place at once ancient and forgotten yet undeniably fresh.

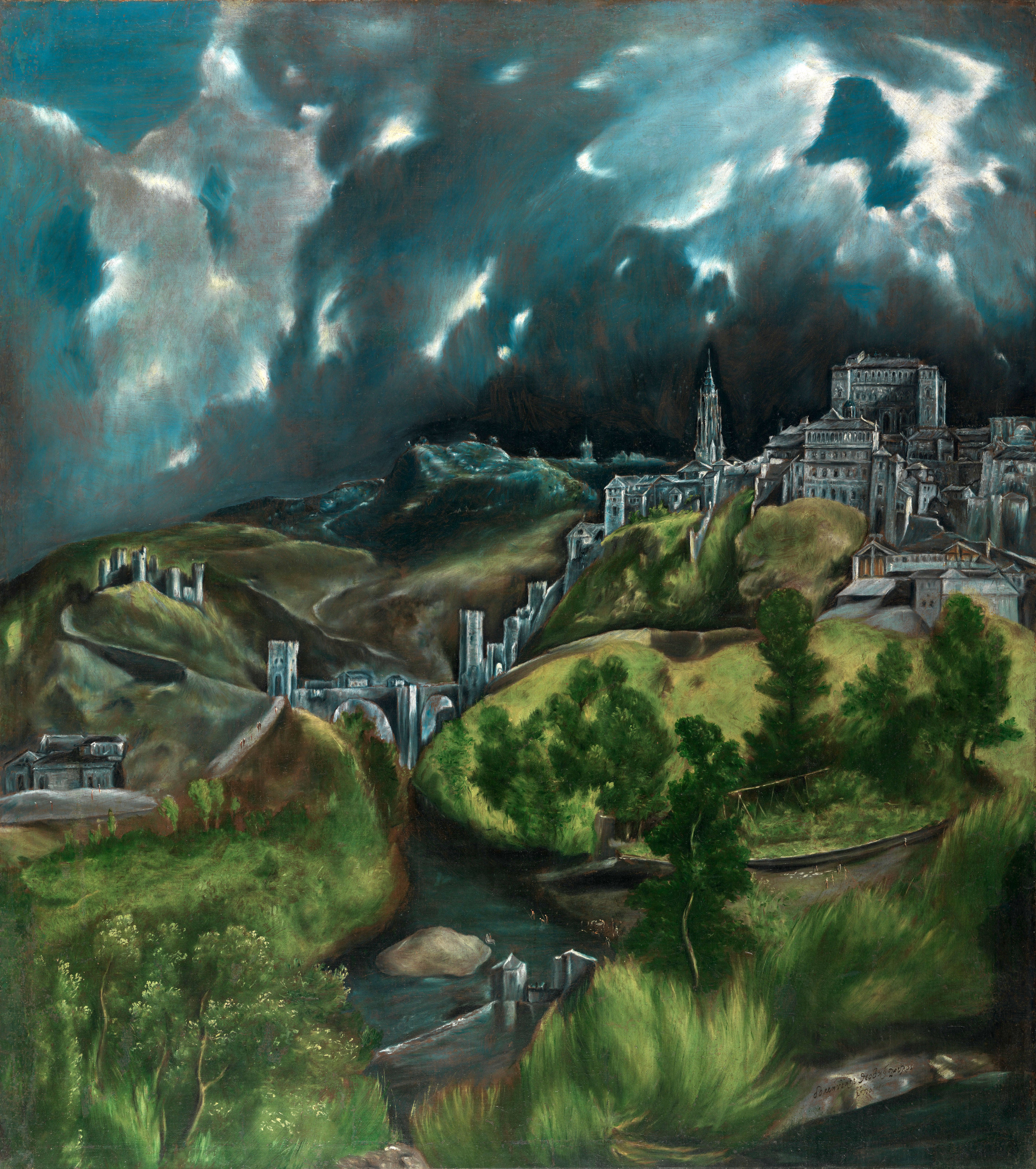
Vista de Toledo by El Greco (1599). Metropolitan Museum of Art, New York.

The Order, although it certainly imbibed the essence of this Romantic fascination with Toledo, also transcended it. What differentiated the Order from the Romantics was its willingness to immerse, not just observe. In the Order was an “invitation to lose oneself as a form of continual discovery of the city and to be able to soak up personal experiences there, beyond the usual routes of visits and promenades from the previous tradition.”

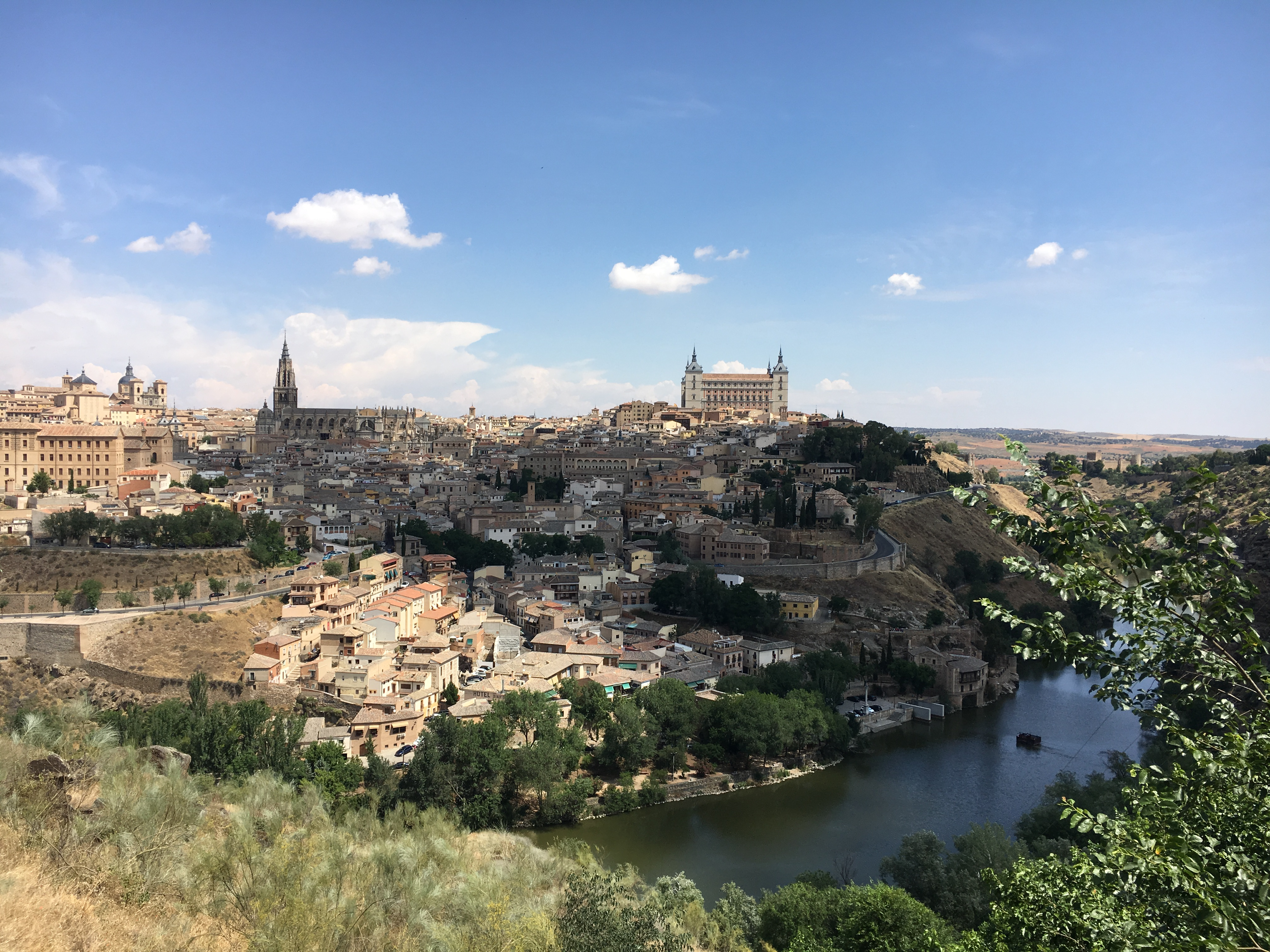
Toledo in 2017

Visits to the city were ritualized in time and space. On Saturday afternoons, the members of the Order would depart by train from Madrid to the Toledo station, and from there they would walk to the Plaza de Zocodover and sip some red wine. Then came conversation and dinner, all fuel for the coming night wanderings. They might walk through the streets to the Plaza of Santo Domingo el Antiguo or the small Bécquer library, then continue walking until sunrise. They would return to the Posada de la Sangre, which was always dirty, but, in its age and constancy, inimitably so. And after just a few hours of sleep, they would reconvene in Zocodover, this time for coffee. Then they continued the visit—to the Cathedral and up to its bell tower, to the Alcázar, to the tomb of Cardinal Tavera—to all the high and low points of the city and everything in between. The visits always concluded with a meal in the Venta de Aires.

The Order entered a literary and historic pantheon of itinerant musings in the city, but it left its own mark on the city by exploring beyond its tourist appeal:

Instead of staying in hotels recommended by guidebooks, they [the knights of the Order] stayed in las Posadas de la Hermandad, de la Sangre, among muleteers, donkeys, and cobwebs—all of which were the same as those in the times of the Catholic Monarchs or Cervantes. They ate and drank incontinently, then entered the labyrinth of narrow streets…they made mockery of the consecrated monuments, but were kissing the stones because they had been trodden by generations and races and many people like themselves, the Grecos, Lopes de Vegas, Cervantes, Herreras, Quevedos, Calderones, amazed and restless. They were looking for sites of fear; they were walking expecting surprises.

== Activities ==
The locale was always the same, but the adventures were variable. Buñuel recounts a late and snowy night when he and Ugarte heard children reciting multiplication tables, then laughing before being rebuked by their teacher. Buñuel climbed onto the shoulders of Ugarte, trying to see through the window, but saw nothing except darkness and heard nothing except silence. Other times, encouraged by varying levels of tipsiness, the members would kiss the ground, climb the bell tower of the cathedral, eavesdrop on the singing of nuns and monks through the walls of convents and monasteries, or read poetry loudly as they walked, listening to the verses as they “resonated on the walls of the antique capital of Spain, an Iberian, Roman, Visigoth, Jewish, Christian city.”

María Teresa León, wife of Rafael Alberti and herself a member of the Order, describes their activities as even more mischievous in nature:

The brothers of the Order of Toledo were always talking loudly, proclaiming their opinions, making scenes. They would sing and look at girls or invent words, throwing them like darts against the walls and making up compliments and pick-up lines. We were overflowing with a happiness that was not quite suited for that walled city, which was always on the defensive. They should have thought us invaders. Invaders that were walking on the chest of the history of Spain, just like the bedbugs in the Posada de la Sangre on the chest of Rafael.

Activities of the Order came to a sudden end in July 1936 when Francisco Franco took Toledo in the Siege of the Alcázar in the first year of the Spanish Civil War. The members were scattered during the Spanish Civil War, the Second World War, and their aftermath—some fled; some fought; some were exiled; still others were shot. Buñuel notes in his memoirs that at the beginning of the Civil War, an anarchist brigade in Madrid found a box marked “Order of Toledo” during a registration. The keeper of the box tried to explain that the name was not a real noble title, but in the end, it cost him his life.

== Memory of the Order ==
The adventure was sporadic, and although it did not serve to revitalize the dormant Toledan culture, it did strike something deep within its protagonists, like a great flash in that rebel and vanguard formation that led to the main creations in the advancement of Spanish cinema, literature, and art.

During the Spanish Civil War, Buñuel was exiled from Spain. Not until the early 1960s was he permitted to return—only temporarily—to make films. The first film he made in Spain after his exile, Viridiana, was shot in Toledo. Buñuel would continue relying on Toledo in many of his later films not just as a backdrop, but as a persistent presence, a character in its own right.

Tristana (1970) is an interesting study in Buñuel's simultaneous memorialization of the city of Toledo and the Order of Toledo. The plot follows the progression of Tristana from a young orphan subjected to sexual abuse by her guardian, Don Lope, to a hardened woman capable of incredible emotional cruelty. Central to Tristana's development is the setting of Toledo. In an elliptical circuit that begins and ends in a walk around the city (itself evocative of Buñuel's own return to the city), Tristana endures psychological twists and turns perfectly reflected in the palpable constriction of the narrow, winding streets. In the tomb of Cardinal Tavera, Tristana hovers—as if poised to kiss the marble lips—in the last moment of her innocence.

Perhaps the most significant Toledan presence in the film is the Cathedral—or, rather, the bell of the Cathedral—featured repeatedly in the sights and sounds of the movie. The bell is most prominent as a nightmare (and later a fantasy), as Tristana dreams that the clapper has metamorphosed into the severed head of her guardian. The first occurrence of the nightmare signals the impending consummation of the sexual relationship between Tristana and Don Lope, and the last, his impending death. The bell, then, is an omen, but also a reminder:

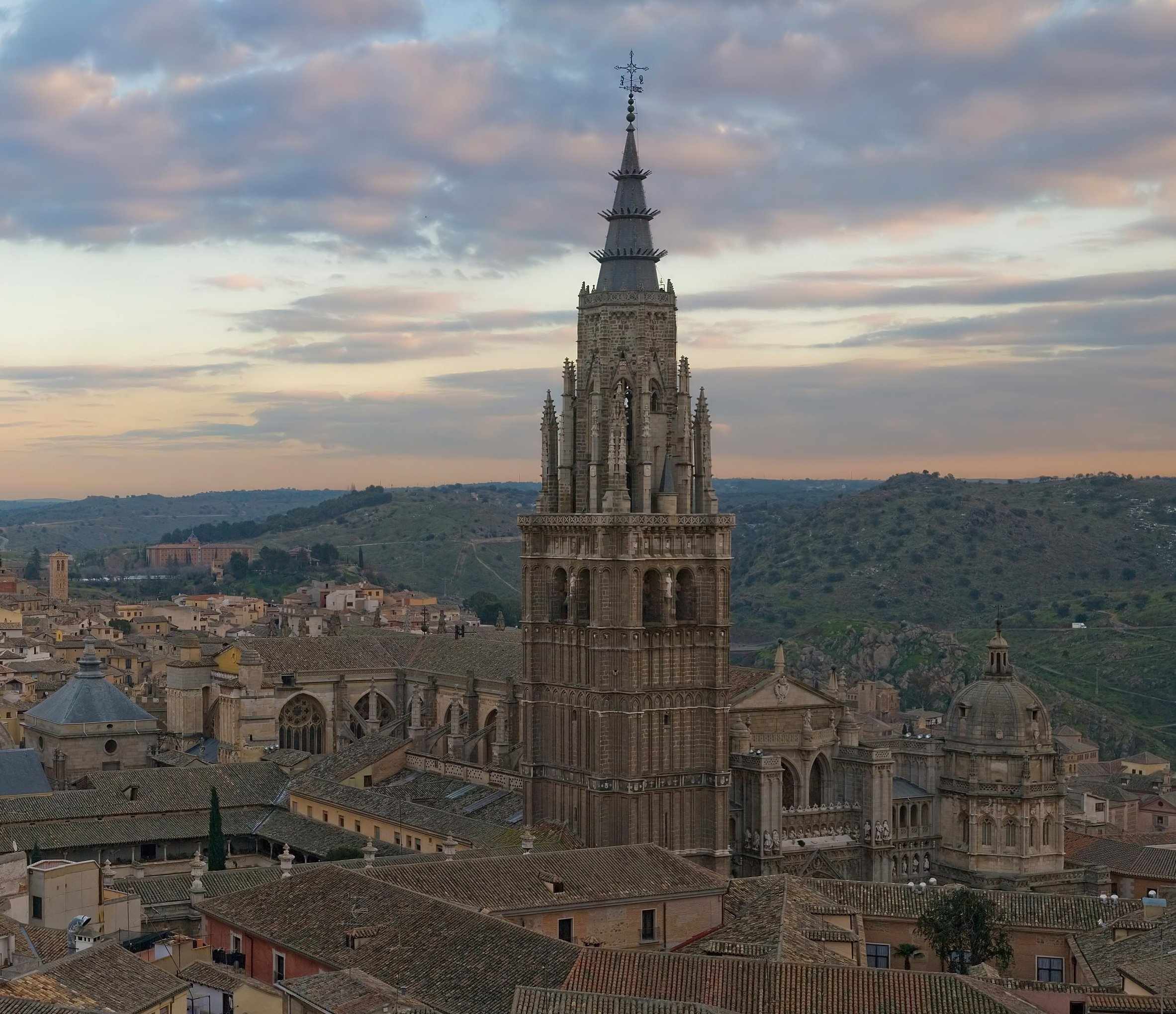
Bell tower of the Cathedral of Toledo.

The itinerary of Tristana is that of her own life, which, in a rapid finale to the movie, passes before us like an oneiric dream turned nightmare in the identity of the head-bell of Don Lope signifying the unchangeable ringing of a stagnant society…However, underlying that static world, mummified and without exit, Buñuel exposes the turbulent movement of the subconscious. That which is real is arrested, but that which is imaginary seethes in desire and vengeance.

In his own Toledan explorations, Buñuel returned frequently to the bell tower, considering it a compulsory stop in the nocturnal activities of the Order. In the film, this reverence is evident, as the bell's metronomic tolls, both conscious and unconscious, evoke the memory of the Order in its surrealist wanderings between waking and dreaming. Tristana is based on a novel of the same name published by Benito Pérez Galdós in 1892. The setting of the novel was late-19th century Madrid. By translating the story to early-20th century Toledo, Buñuel makes not only a spatial return to that sacred city, but also a spiritual and temporal return to the Toledo that the Order knew. This return, however, is not explicit, nor is it complete. The Toledo of the era of the Order had changed irrevocably in the succession of wars, Franco, and modernity. Buñuel had changed too, and the fact was that in his lifetime he would never make a complete return; his time in Spain lasted only as long as it took to shoot his films.

In 2001, Carlos Saura, who knew and worked with Buñuel, resumed the ellipsis of Buñuel in Toledo with his film Buñuel y la mesa del rey Salomón. The plot follows an older Buñuel returning to Spain after exile to work on a movie about the legend of the Table of King Solomon, a mirror imbued with the power of absolute knowledge of past, present, and future and rumored to be hidden somewhere in Toledo. In flashbacks, Buñuel reunites with fellow Order members Salvador Dalí and Federico García Lorca to search for the Table in 1920s Toledo. Finally, in a cinematic fusion of memory and fantasy, Buñuel makes a full return to his beloved city to “face his own ghosts, interwoven in an inseparable fashion with those of the history and country to which that city has served as spiritual capital.”

In making the movie that Buñuel never made and returning him to the Toledo he had lost forever, Buñuel y la mesa del rey Salomón ensures that the Order survives not only as a remembrance of the city but also as a remembrance in itself, a site of artistic and spiritual inspiration and imagination across generations:

“Those marvelous years [of the Order] still circulate in our veins, enriching us, blinding us with dazzling memories.”
