= Orto (magazine) =

Cultural anarchist magazine in Valencia, Spain (1932–1934)

- Editor: Marín Civera
- Categories: Cultural magazine; Anarchist magazine
- Frequency: Monthly
- Founder: Marín Civera
- Founded: 1932
- First issue: March 1932
- Final issue: January 1934
- Country: Spain
- Based in: Valencia
- Language: Spanish

Orto was a monthly anarchist cultural magazine which was published in Valencia, Spain, between 1932 and 1934. Its subtitle was Revista de documentación social (Spanish: Magazine of social documentation).

== History and profile ==
Orto was started in Valencia in 1932, and its first issue appeared in March that year. It was founded and edited by Marín Civera. Josep Renau worked as the graphic editor of the magazine. Major contributors of Orto included Benjamín Jarnés, Ramón J. Sender, Isaac Puente, Hildegart Rodríguez and Vital Aza.

Orto was published on a monthly basis by the Institute of Social History Foundation and supported the Spanish labour movement. The magazine aimed to provide a forum for people with the different working-class ideologies depending on the ideas of syndicalism. Like other publications of the period in the country it also supported the premises of Neo-Malthusian and Eugenics. In terms of economics the magazine adhered to Marxism for which it was criticized. Marín Civera attempted to develop a synthesis of Marxism and anarcho-syndicalism in the magazine.

Orto featured articles on health, science, urbanism, agrarianism, politics, economy, sexuality, art, feminism and social struggles. It also published critical articles on religion.

Orto folded in January 1934 after producing twenty issues.
