= Benjamín Jarnés =

Spanish writer (1888–1949)

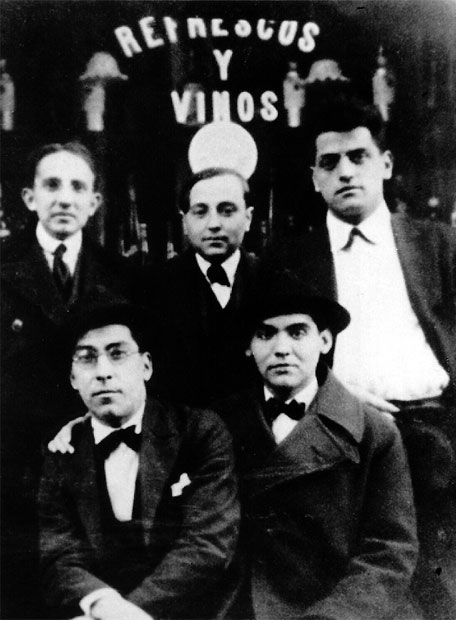
Benjamín Jarnés (standing first from the left), Huberto Pérez de la Ossa, Luis Buñuel. Rafael Barradas and Federico García Lorca in Madrid, 1923

Benjamín Jarnés y Millán (October 7, 1888 – August 11, 1949) was a Spanish writer. Having been a soldier for a decade, he quit the army in 1920 and published his first novel in 1924. His second novel El profesor inútil (The Useless Professor, 1926) met with success and was followed by books such as El convidado de papel (1928) and Teoría del zumbel (1930). He was one of the contributors of the Madrid-based Revista de Occidente and the Valencia-based Orto magazine between 1932 and 1934.

He fought on the Republican side during the Spanish Civil War, and after General Franco's victory, he fled to Mexico. He turned his attention to writing biographies of writers such as Stefan Zweig and Miguel de Cervantes. In 1948 he returned to Spain, the year before his death in Madrid.
