= Profs =

- Theatrical release poster
- Directed by: Patrick Schulmann
- Written by: Patrick Schulmann
- Produced by: Gilbert de Goldschmidt
- Starring: Patrick Bruel; Fabrice Luchini; Laurent Gamelon; Christophe Bourseiller
- Cinematography: Jacques Assuerus
- Edited by: Aline Asseo
- Music by: Patrick Schulmann
- Distributed by: AMLF
- Release date: 18 September 1985
- Running time: 95 minutes
- Country: France
- Language: French
- Box office: $21.3 million

Profs (sometimes stylized P.R.O.F.S) is a French comedy film directed by Patrick Schulmann and released on 18 September 1985.

== Plot ==
A young literature teacher, Frédéric Game, has very "cool" methods that separate from the high school where he has just arrived. With his friends Michel, Gérard and Francis, he decides to modify the traditions and renovate the high school. These teachers use anti-conformist educative methods :

- Frédéric attempts to inculcate the critical spirit and the draft evasion at the authority of his students. Sometimes, he absents himself and projects them a video of him on a boat giving his class. At the end, it is the students themselves who will take the initiative to move the class on the roof of the building to make him react. He will attempt to seduce Julie, a substitute teacher, but she will be at the opposite attracted to Gérard. Even if he lives with his parents, he forms a distant couple with Marité, but she will decide to leave him and move to another region to distance herself. After an incident with a student, he will simulate a broken leg and arm for not being able to go back to school anymore for the end of the school year.
- Michel, an art teacher, attempts to open his students to the art in the wide sense, whatever it is via an exposition of a language for babies symbolizing the waste, or to motivate them for redecorating the classes of the teachers. His conjugal relationship is tumultuous, his partner reproaching him to accord too much importance to his artistic practice and to refuse having a child together. He will end depressive when one of his students will have more success than him during an exposition.
- Gérard, a sport teacher, initiates his students to hula hoop, water skiing (where the students run fast to simulate the boat), windsurfing (during a windy day), golf, boomerang, etc. The activities often end with an accident. His relationship with Julie obliges him to numerous efforts, especially the cultural trips or reading novels, as well as the conception of a physical and more cerebral love. He will end depressive after the leaving of Julie.
- Francis, a librarian, adept of the least effort for the classification in the library. Finding himself alone while his three other acolytes will be out of the school, he will be stated sick at his turn.

The four acolytes will use of several stratagems to get rid of some teachers they judge harmful.

- Charles Max, a philosophy teacher admirer of Karl Marx. They will stun him and relook him during his sleep to give him an appearance of Hitler with a tuft of hair and a small moustache.
- Flora Taulier, a physics and chemistry teacher with authoritarian methods and who often uses torture with her students. They will mix some of her chemical products, which will cause an explosion in the class during a chemical experience.
- René Nogret, a math teacher. They will add alcohol in the coffee machine at the point of making him drunk and ridiculous in public and at the sight of the director.

They will also use of a stratagem to stick Josiane, the librarian and Bonnet, the censor, making them pass for lovers at the sight of the director and numerous witnesses. Finally, Caroline Derieux, a biology teacher and in love with Frédéric, will have a suicide attempt during one of her classes when she will understand that he does not share her feelings. Frédéric is globally appreciated by his students, at the point that Guillaume, a student, becomes jealous of him, thinking that he covets Lætitia, a student of his class with whom he is himself in love with.

== Cast ==
- Patrick Bruel ... Frédéric Game, literature teacher
- Fabrice Luchini ... Michel, art teacher
- Laurent Gamelon ... Gérard Birdil, sport teacher
- Christophe Bourseiller ... Francis Cèze, librarian
- Étienne Draber ... Bonnet, the censor
- Martine Sarcey ... the director
- Yolande Gilot ... Julie, Gérard's "brainy" partner, philosophy teacher
- Charlotte Julian ... Josyane Malet, librarian and syndicalist
- Guy Montagné ... René Nogret, math teacher
- Isabelle Mergault ... Caroline Derieux, biology teacher
- Chantal Neuwirth ... Flora Taulier, physics and chemistry teacher
- Camille de Casabianca ... Françoise, Michel's partner
- Jean-René Gossart ... Charles Max, philosophy teacher
- Anne Fontaine ... Marité, Frédéric's partner
- André Raffard ... Nouel, Latin teacher
- Malène Sveinbjornsson ... Lætitia Bellert, Maud's friend
- Lionel Melet ... Guillaume Rosel, the student in love with Lætitia
- Sheila O'Connor ... Maud, Lætitia's friend and class delegate
- Brigitte-Hélène Morel ... Nathalie, Francis's wife (credited as Brigitte Morel)
- Sylvie Sénéchal ... Miss Gallot, the preparator in chemistry
- Jacques Disses ... history teacher
- Christine Melcer ... English teacher
- David Pierre-Bloch ... Lionel, the student tortured by Flora

== About the film ==
- The film title is stylized as an acronym in a reference to MASH by Robert Altman, treating the same subject in a different environment, which is a group of US Army surgeons during Korean War. This reference is directly assumed in the film, in a scene where Frédéric puts the poster of the film MASH on the panel of the high school.
- In the film, the school projects the film Zero for Conduct where one of the characters is named Bruel.
- The film took place in Boulogne-Billancourt (high school that has since become a police station), Vineuil-Saint-Firmin and place des Moineaux in Pontoise.
- In 2011, Christophe Bourseiller announced in an article from Les Inrocks that another sequel of Profs would be released soon. But until now, no project or sequel has been evoked since.
