= Guy Montagné =

French actor (born 1948)

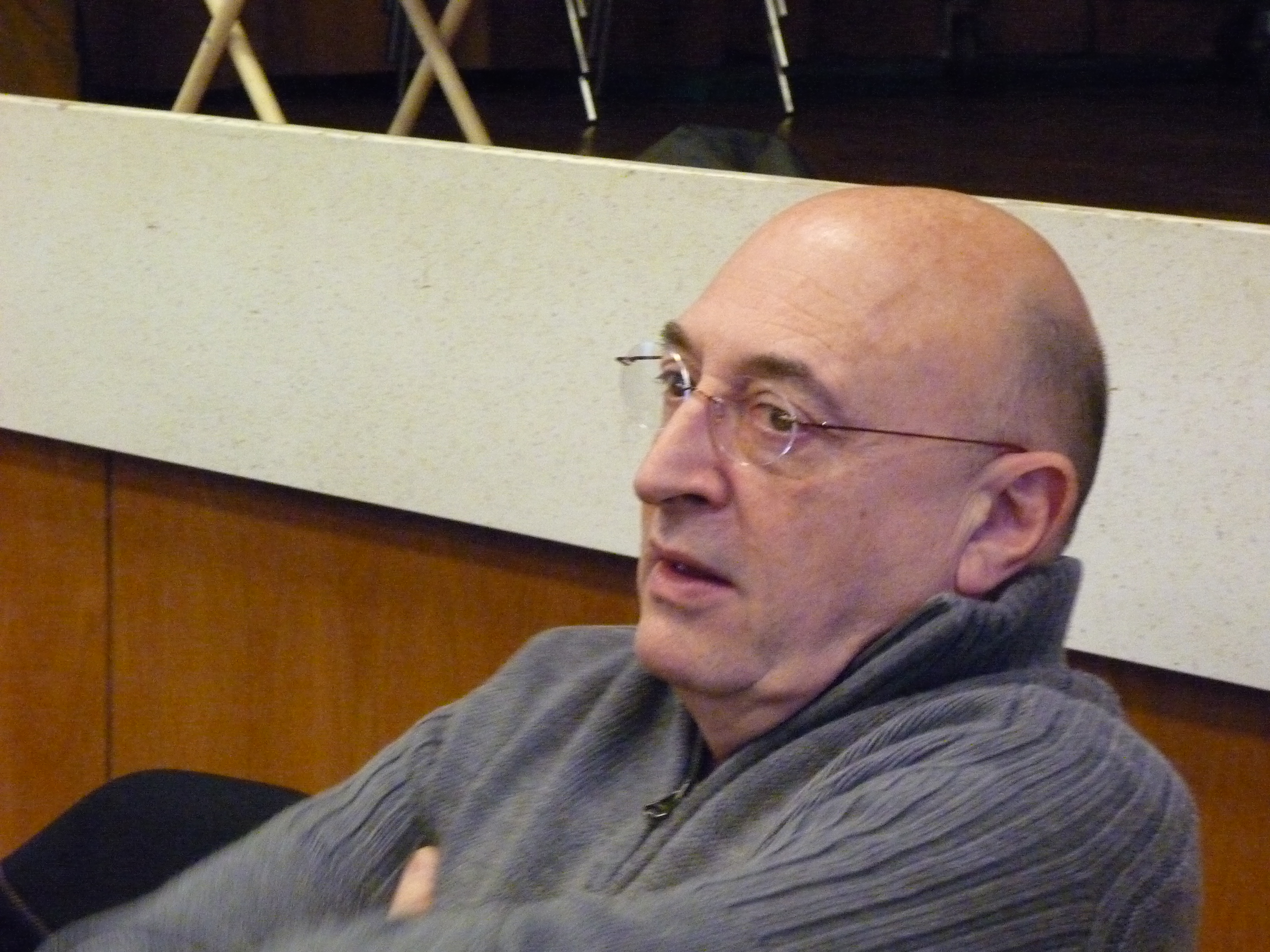
- Guy Montagné in 2008.
- Born: 6 March 1948 (age 77); Paris, France
- Occupation(s): Actor, comedian, radio personality
- Years active: 1974–present
- Notable credit: Les Grosses Têtes (RTL)
- Website: www.guymontagne.fr

Guy Montagné (born 6 March 1948) is a French actor, comedian and radio personality.

== Life ==
He was the "grandson of a lyrical singer, in a family that had produced generations of musicians", and the son of Jean-Claude Beïret Montagné, a radio and electronics engineer who during the Vichy years went underground rather than submit to forced labor conscription; was imprisoned in Pamplona under the Franco regime; but eventually joined the Free French in Casablanca.

In 1972, he graduated from René Simon's acting school and quickly found employment in the films of Robert Manuel as well as Luis Buñuel, who cast him as the Young Monk in The Phantom of Liberty (1974).

== Career ==
From 1976 to 1978, Guy Montagné portrayed in several episodes the role of Guyomard in the television series Commissaire Moulin. In 1978, Stéphane Collaro engaged him to perform imitations and write comic texts of his radio program on Europe 1. Having found the sitcom Tous les chemins mènent au rhum, the first political radiophonic sitcom, propelled Collaro and Montagné at the top of the radio audience. These audience successes then became televisual from 1979 to 1981 with Le Collaro show. The Collaro troop pass from Antenne 2 to TF1 and the show was retitled Co-Co Boy where Guy Montagné met American coco-girl Terry Shane. She then became his wife and his screenwriter for his one-man shows.

In 1985, he is the French voice of Donald Duck in the television program Le Disney Channel on FR3. For a decade from the late 1970s to the mid-1980s, he knew his period of success, where he was very popular, with his neurotic, hot-tempered and talkative character. After that period, due to the departure of Stéphane Collaro for the channel La Cinq in 1987, the following period was darker and more difficult. In the 1990s, he began a career in cabaret where he played numerous shows, but the successful period of the 1980s was far. He asked from time to time his friend Patrick Sébastien to participate at his television shows, which gave him the opportunity to begin in the television field. But in the meantime, the audience began more attracted to other comics like Alex Métayer and Élie Kakou. His repertoire had no evolution and since the 1990s, his situation was similar to Jean Roucas.

Willing to start again his career in cinema, he made the mistake in 1992 participating at the film of the return of Les Charlots without Gérard Rinaldi entitled Le Retour des Charlots. The film was a commercial failure and considered as a flop, which compromised his film career with a lot of refuses to castings. Guy Montagné was in the 1990s one of the most important personalities of the radio program Les Grosses Têtes hosted by Philippe Bouvard and also participated at the occasional television programs of the same name.

In February 2014, he was victim of a facial nerve paralysis on the left side called Bell's palsy, due to the stress of the ticket theft of the show he had to play in the town of Muzillac in the department of Morbihan, and the way he was treated by the municipality after the theft, who refused to reimburse him. He then made a sketch of it. Treated at La Pitié-Salpêtrière in Paris, he was cured two months after the incident.

== Filmography ==
- La Bonzesse (1974) .... Le barman du club échangiste (uncredited)
- Le Fantôme de la liberté (1974) .... Le jeune moine (the Young Monk)
- L'apprenti salaud (1977) .... L'employé de banque (uncredited)
- That Obscure Object of Desire (1977) .... (uncredited)
- Elle voit des nains partout ! (1982) .... Le Temps
- Qu'est-ce qui fait craquer les filles ? (1982) .... Cervoise, the hotel owner
- American Dreamer (1984) .... a taxi driver
- Profs (1985) .... René Nogret, the math teacher
- Paulette, la pauvre petite milliardaire (1986) .... the farmer
- Les Oreilles entre les dents (1987) .... Gayat
- The Professional Secrets of Dr. Apfelgluck (1991) .... Un gendarme (uncredited)
- Le Retour des Charlots (1992) .... Adjudant Caussade
- Dieu, l'amant de ma mère et le fils du charcutier (1995) .... Jean Richain
- Le Temps d'un regard (2007) .... Gaston (final film role)

== Radio programs ==
- 1978–81 : participation at the program of Stéphane Collaro À vos souhaits on Europe 1.
- 1981–82 : presenter with Jacques Pessis of the program Show les cœurs on RMC.
- 1986–87 : presenter at the daily rubric Le journal à Montagné on Radio Tour Eiffel.
- 1988–2000 : participant at the program Les Grosses Têtes of Philippe Bouvard on RTL.
