= Luis Lacasa =

Spanish architect (1899–1966)

Luis Lacasa Navarro
- Born: 1899; Ribadesella, Asturias, Spain
- Died: 30 March 1966 (aged 66–67); Moscow, Russia
- Occupation: Architect

Luis Lacasa Navarro (1899 – 30 March 1966) was a Spanish architect. His work in Spain and Paris before and during the Spanish Civil War (1936–39) was rationalist and functional. He is best known as the co-designer of the Spanish Pavilion at the 1937 Paris Exposition, a work designed to showcase the modern legitimacy of the embattled Spanish Republic. After the war he went into exile in the Soviet Union.

== Spain and Germany (1899–1923) ==
Luis Lacasa Navarro was born in Ribadesella, Asturias, in 1899. His father, Telmo Lacasa, was the road engineer for Ribadesella. Later his father was reassigned and the family moved to Huesca. Lacasa began to study architecture in Barcelona, then moved on to Madrid, the only other city in Spain where the subject was taught. He graduated from the Superior Technical School of Architecture of Madrid in 1921. At the Residencia de Estudiantes he became friends with Alberto Sánchez^{(es)}, Federico García Lorca, Luis Buñuel and others with whom he founded The Order of Toledo. He went to Germany to learn how to work with reinforced concrete, visited the Bauhaus in Weimar and worked in the Office of Urban Planning in Dresden until 1923. His brother in law was Alberto Sánchez Pérez^{(es)}, a sculptor and painter who learned to read at the age of 15.

== Spain (1923–39) ==
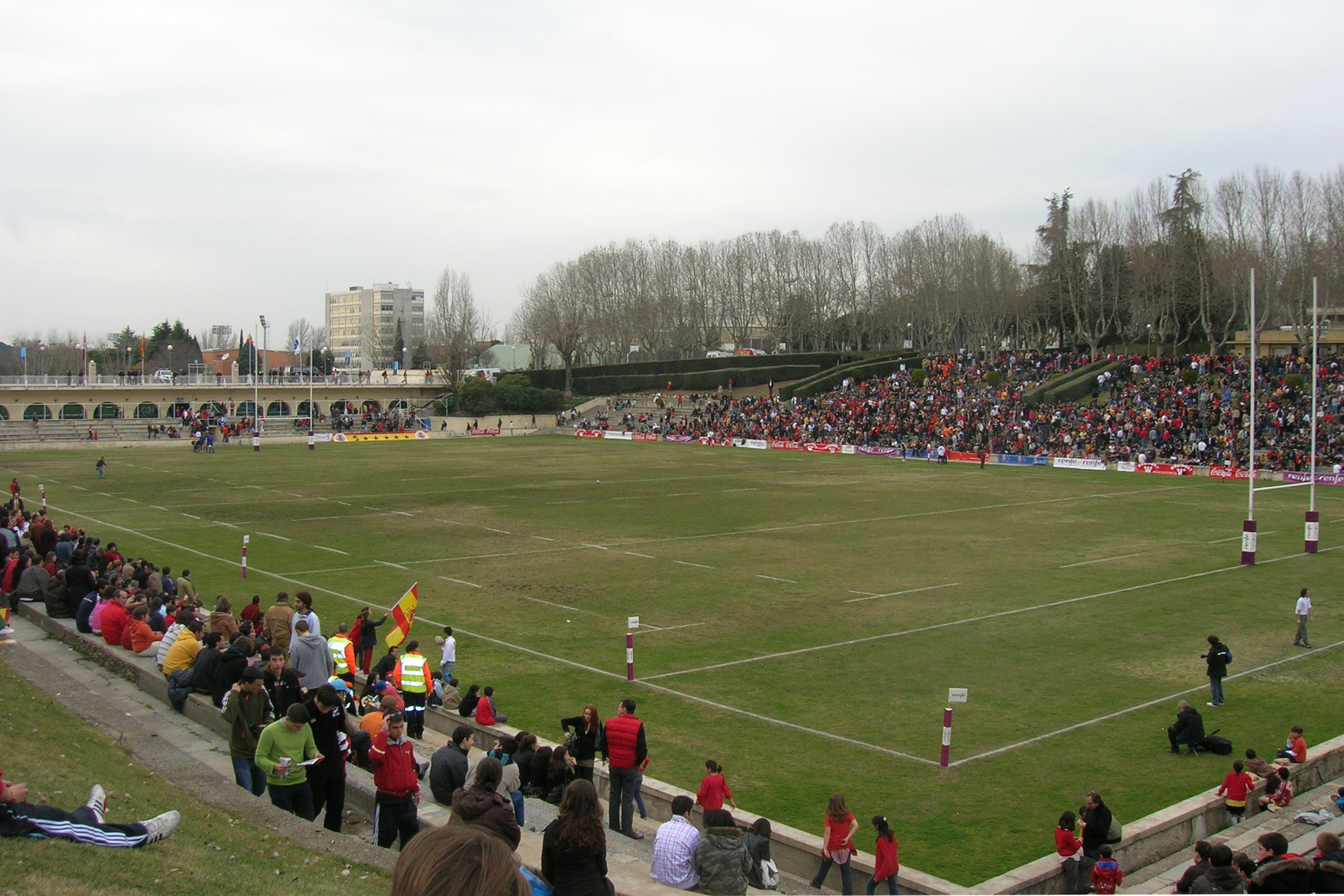
Estadio Nacional Complutense (1927)

In 1923 Lacasa returned to Spain, where he gave lectures on the German approach to urban planning. He became a contributor to the journal Arquitectura, writing articles in which he defended the principles of functionalism. Lacasa belonged to the group of architects of the "Generation of 25", which also included Sánchez Arcas, Luis Gutiérrez Soto and Luis Martínez-Feduchi^{(es)} and introduced the rationalist architecture of the Modern Movement to Madrid. The group organized the 11th National Congress of Architecture in 1925 and the first National Congress of Urbanism in 1926. From 1927 he worked in the Technical Office of the University City of Madrid. In 1930 he helped create the Colegio de Arquitectos de Madrid. In 1931 he joined the Uranization Office of the Madrid City Council. He was a founding member of the Alliance of Antifascist Intellectuals for the Defense of Culture. In 1931 Federico García Lorca published a surrealist poem entitled Vaca dedicated to Luis Lacasa in the magazine Occidente.

Lacasa won a number of competitions in architecture and urban planning, including:

- Hospital Provincial de Toledo (1926–31) with Manuel Sánchez Arcas
- Instituto Nacional de Física y Química, funded by the Rockefeller Foundation (1927–32), with Sánchez Arcas
- Hospital Provincial in Logroño (1929)
- Villages on the irrigated banks of the Guadalquivir (1934), with Jesús Martí Martín and Esteban de la Mora
- Plan de Extensión of Logroño (1935).

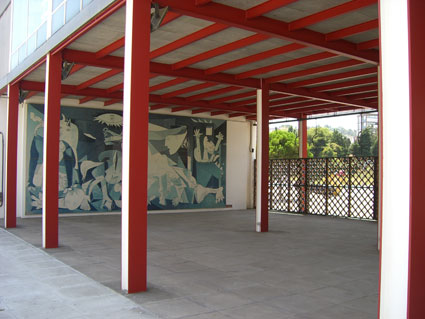
Reconstruction of the ground floor of the Spanish pavilion, with a reproduction of Picasso's Guernica

During the Spanish Civil War (1936–39) Lacasa was commissioned to design the Spanish Pavilion for the 1937 Exposition Internationale des Arts et Techniques dans la Vie Moderne in Paris. He collaborated on this with Josep Lluís Sert, a fellow member of GATEPAC (Grupo de Artistas y Técnicos Españoles Para la Arquitectura Contemporánea). In a book he published in 1937 Lacasa laid out his architectural beliefs and criticized Le Corbusier, whom he considered an ideologue rather than someone who built habitable buildings. Lacasa returned to Spain the next year, but at the end of the Spanish Civil War went into exile in Moscow.

== Soviet Union and China (1939–66) ==
Lacasa was an architect at the Academy of Architecture of the Soviet Union from 1939 to 1954. Between 1943 and 1944 Lacasa and Sánchez Arcas were displaced to the Urals for work on fortifications and defense of Moscow. He spent 1954–60 in China with his family as head of the Spanish section of the Foreign Languages Publishing House. In Peking Lacasa and his wife Soledad never locked the door, since in China at that time there was no concern about thieves, and to lock the door would be insulting to visitors.

In 1960 Lacasa was permitted to return to Spain. A group of young modernist architects heard of his return and decided to organize a tribute. Paco Oíza, José Luis Romany, Carlos Ferrán, Luis Miquel and Pedro Casariego arranged the details and asked the Directorate General of Architecture for financial help for the event and for Lacasa himself. The Director General García Lomas, who later became mayor of Madrid, responded by giving Lacasa 24 hours to leave Spain. He had spent only a month in his native country. In 1964 Lacasa published a memoir about his brother in law, Alberto, in Budapest under the pseudonym of "Peter Martín". He worked in the Institute of Art History of the Academy of Sciences until his death. He died in Moscow on 30 March 1966.

== Notable works ==
=== British Institute building, Madrid ===
In 1926 Lacasa designed a small residential palace for Valentín Ruiz Senén that was later occupied by the British Institute for many years. It has a surprising neoclassical style. The building was erected in 1926-31. It was later remodelled by Luciano Delage Villegas in 1944 and then enlarged by Eduardo Torallas López in 1946.

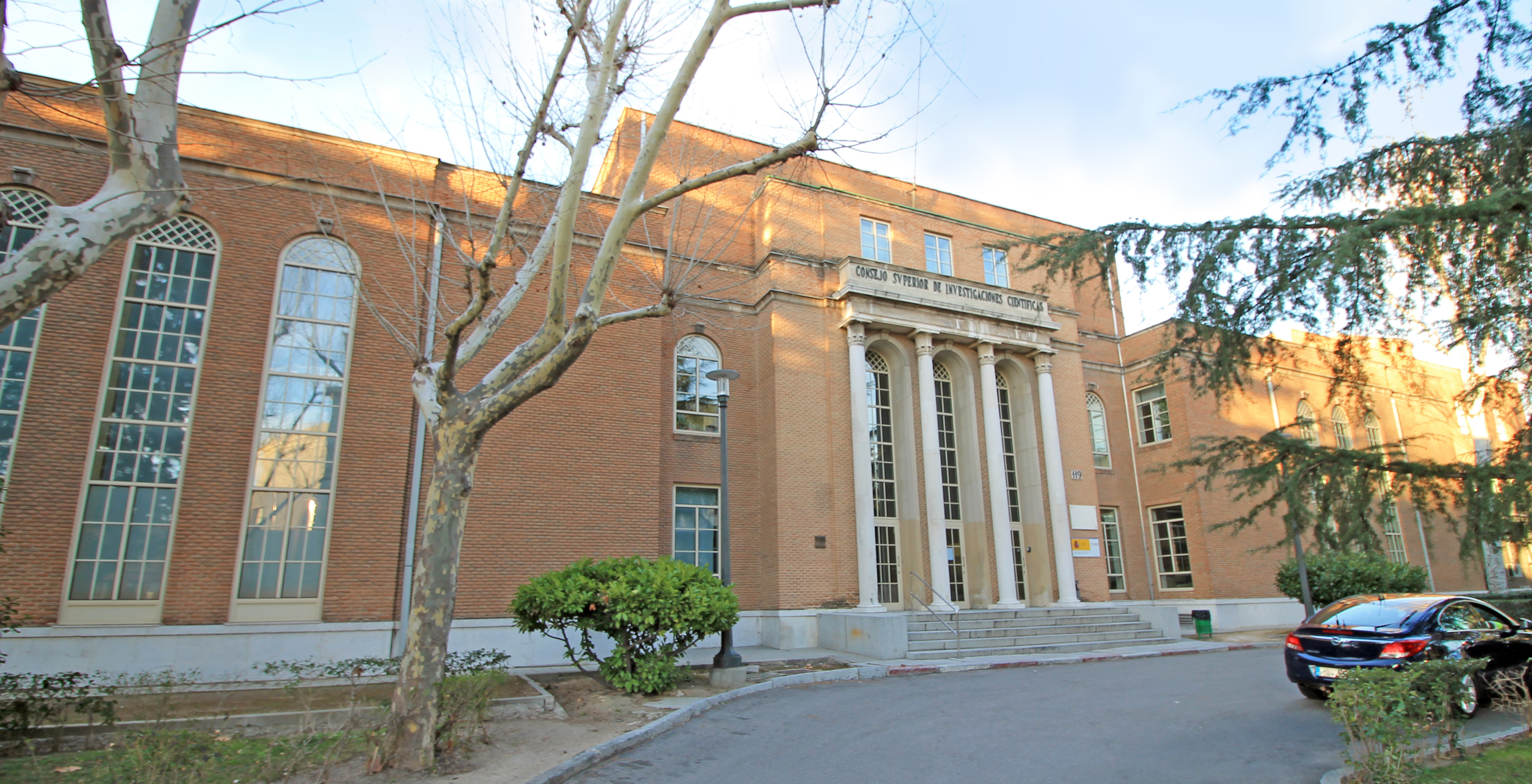
Edificio Rockefeller by Lacasa and Sánchez Arcas (1932)

=== National Institute of Physics and Chemistry ===
Manuel Sánchez Arcas and Lacasa won the 1927 competition by the Board for the Extension of Studies to build the Instituto Nacional de Física y Química (Institute of Physics and Chemistry) funded by the International Education Board of the Rockefeller Foundation. Known as the "Fundación Rockefeller building", it was designed in 1927 and built between 1928 and 1930. The brick structure was carefully thought out. It followed the new principles of rationalist functionalism. It fused these principles with traditional construction practices. The windows of the central body have semicircular arches, while the others are lintelled. A giant portico on the main facade has great simplicity. It recalls classical designs but is free from historicism, and reflects the architecture of the great American universities.

=== Colegios Mayores student residences ===
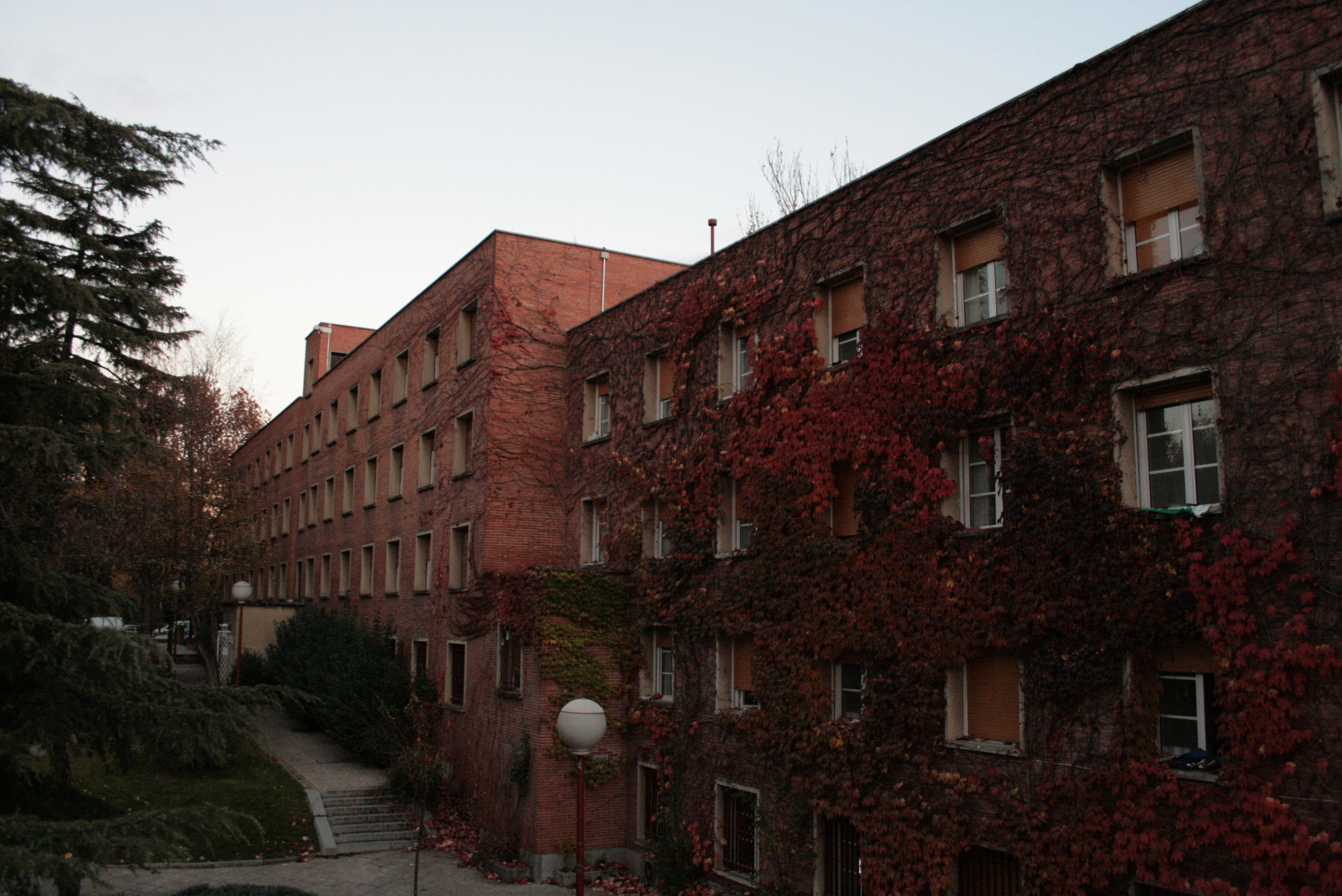
Colegio Mayor Antonio de Nebrija

In 1932 Lacasa designed four residential colleges for Madrid University, Antonio Nebrija, Ximénez de Cisneros, Menéndez y Pelayo and Diego Covarrubias. They were built in 1935–36, and rebuilt and enlarged by Javier Barroso Sánchez-Guerra^{(es)} in 1941–43. The complex of buildings and facilities was a grouping on linear and geometric blocks in an orthogonal and independent arrangement around a series of gardens, open spaces and sports areas. It included T-shaped structures for general services, two bedroom pavilions with corridors to the north and rooms to the south, the director's residence, a conference room and other facilities. Lacasa chose a modular design that allowed repetition of brick forms in pure rationalist orthodoxy. After the civil war the whole complex had to be rebuilt, although the original spirit was preserved.

=== Spanish pavilion at the 1937 Paris exposition ===
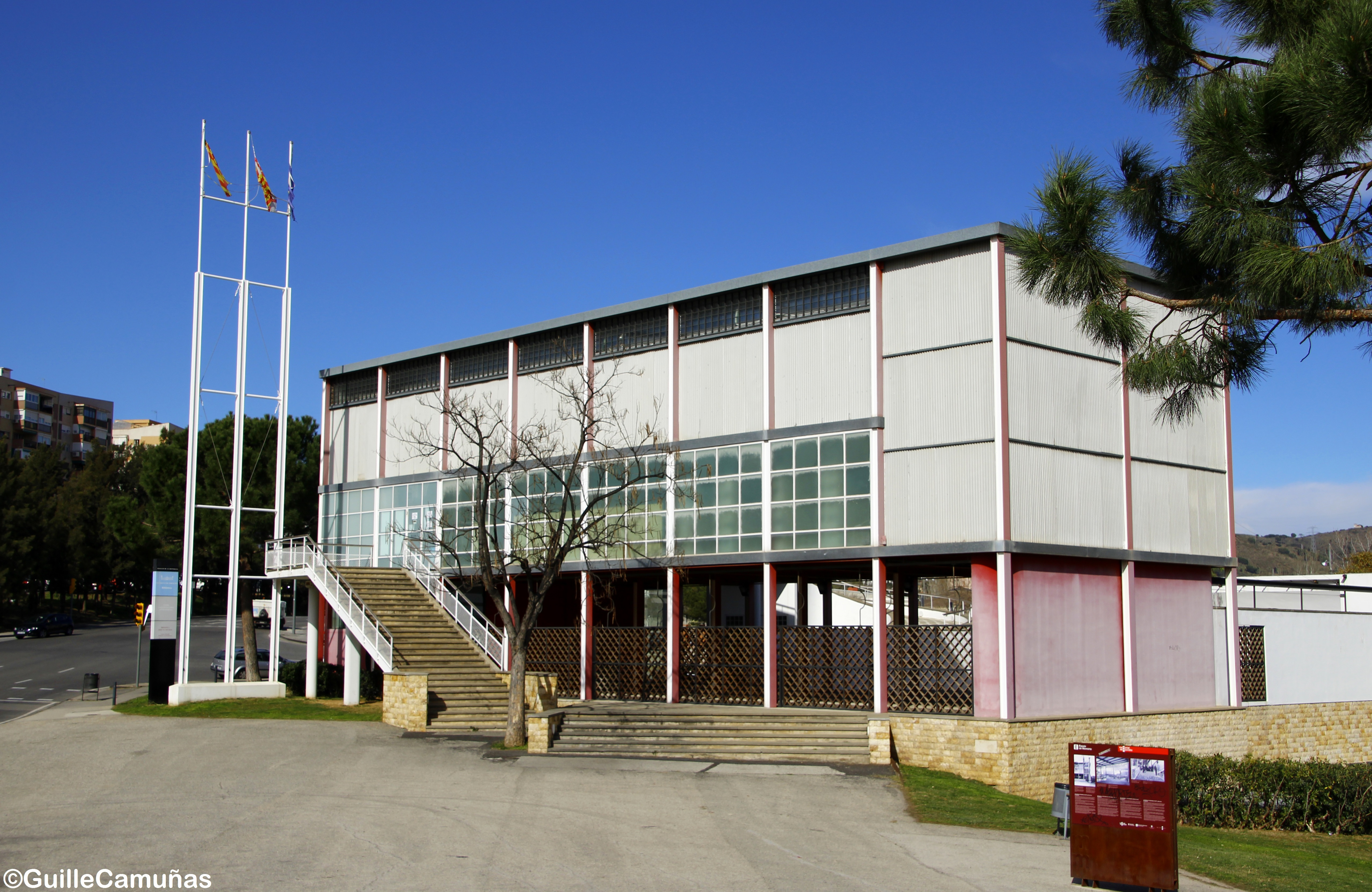
Pavelló de la República CRAI Library in Barcelona, a reproduction of the 1937 Spanish pavilion

Lacasa was commissioned to design the Spanish Pavilion for the 1937 Paris Exposition. He was later joined by Josep Lluís Sert, the most international of Spanish architects at the time. They were helped by the young architect Antoni Bonet i Castellana and by the French architect Abella. The two main architects favoured different styles, with Lacasa in favour of regionalism and social realism and Sert in modern rationalism. Sert's views prevailed in the structure, while Lacasa was responsible for the museography and content. Josep Renau, head of the Directorate General of Fine Arts, made key decisions about the content, as did the Ministries of Propaganda and Public Industry.

The Spanish Pavilion had a rationalist architecture and used modern, functional materials. The temporary building was erected quickly on a small site in the Jardins du Trocadéro, with a very limited budget. It tried to demonstrate that despite the civil war the Spanish Republic was committed to modernity and humanism. The structure had an exact, cool geometry that emphasises horizontal shapes. It was largely colored in shades of gray, although the red lines of the painted metal structure gave a Spanish touch. It contained Pablo Picasso's painting Guernica. Picasso visited the pavilion while it was being built, and Sert visited Picasso in his workshop while he was making the painting. The Spanish pavilion was rebuilt in Barcelona for the 1992 Summer Olympics.

== Publications ==
Publications by Lacasa included:

- Lacasa Navarro, Luis (2012), José Laborda Yneva (ed.), Artículos en la revista arquitectura, 1922- 1935 / Luis Lacasa Navarro, Éntasis, Zaragoza: Institución Fernando el Católico, p. 170

== Sources ==
- Collins, George R. (March 1965), "Spain: A Case Study in Action and Reaction", Journal of the Society of Architectural Historians, 24 (1), University of California Press on behalf of the Society of Architectural Historians, doi:10.2307/988282, JSTOR 988282
- El Pabellón español de la Exposición Internacional de 1937 en París (in Spanish), Artium, 2010
- Fernández Aparicio, Carmen, Maqueta del Pabellón de España en la Exposición Internacional de París de 1937 (in Spanish), Museo Nacional Centro de Arte Reina Sofía
- Guerrero, Salvador, Luis Lacasa (in Spanish), La Junta para Ampliación de Estudios e Investigaciones Científicas
- Instituto Nacional de Física y Química "Fundación Rockefeller" del CSIC (in Spanish), Fundación Arquitectura COAM, archived from the original on 2018-10-05
- Josep Lluís Sert y Luis Lacasa (in Spanish), Artium, 2010
- Lafuente, A; Saraiva, T. (2004), "The Urban Scale of Science and the Enlargement of Madrid (1851-1936)", Social Studies of Science, 34 (4)
- León, María Teresa (1976–1977), "La llave", Litoral (in Spanish) (64/66), Revista Litoral S.A., JSTOR 43316072
- Malo de Molina, Julio (8 August 2015), "Luis Lacasa", lavozdigital.es (in Spanish), LVCD S.L.U.
- Miró, Joan (2008), In their own words, CENDEAC, ISBN 978-84-96898-36-3
- Palacete para D. Valentín Ruiz Senén (in Spanish), Fundación Arquitectura COAM, archived from the original on 2018-10-05
- Peralta Gilabert, Rosa (2012), "Diferentes Vivencias En La Escenografía Del Exilio: Alberto Sánchez, Miguel Prieto Y Antoni Clavé", Anales de la literatura española contemporánea (in Spanish), 37 (2), Society of Spanish & Spanish-American Studies, JSTOR 23237387
- Residencias de estudiantes (in Spanish), Fundación Arquitectura COAM, archived from the original on 2018-10-05
- Vela Cossío, Fernando (3 September 2011), "Luis Lacasa, un arquitecto de origen riosellano", La Nueva Espana (in Spanish), Editorial Prensa Asturiana, S.A.
