= Plaza de Zocodover, Toledo =

Public square in Toledo

Coordinates: 39°51′34.28″N 4°1′16.87″W

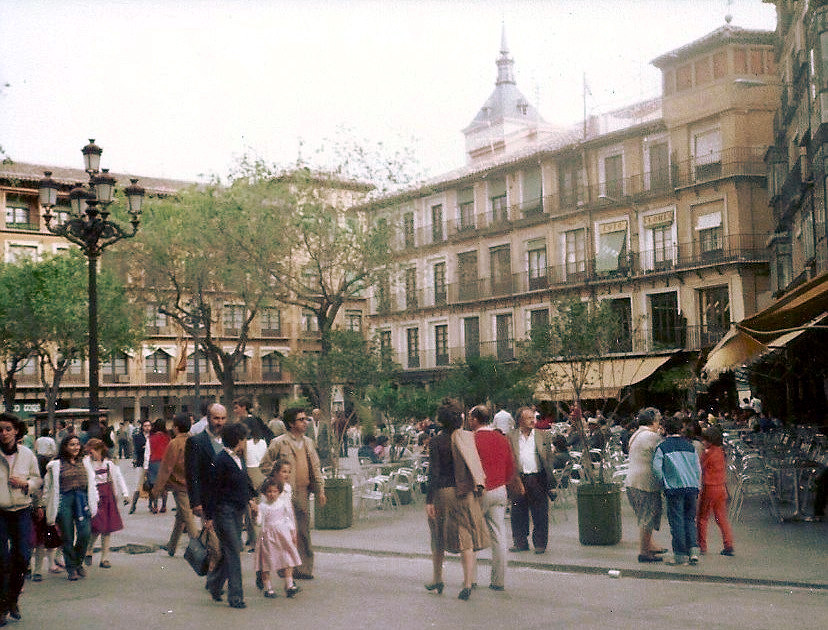
Plaza de Zocodover

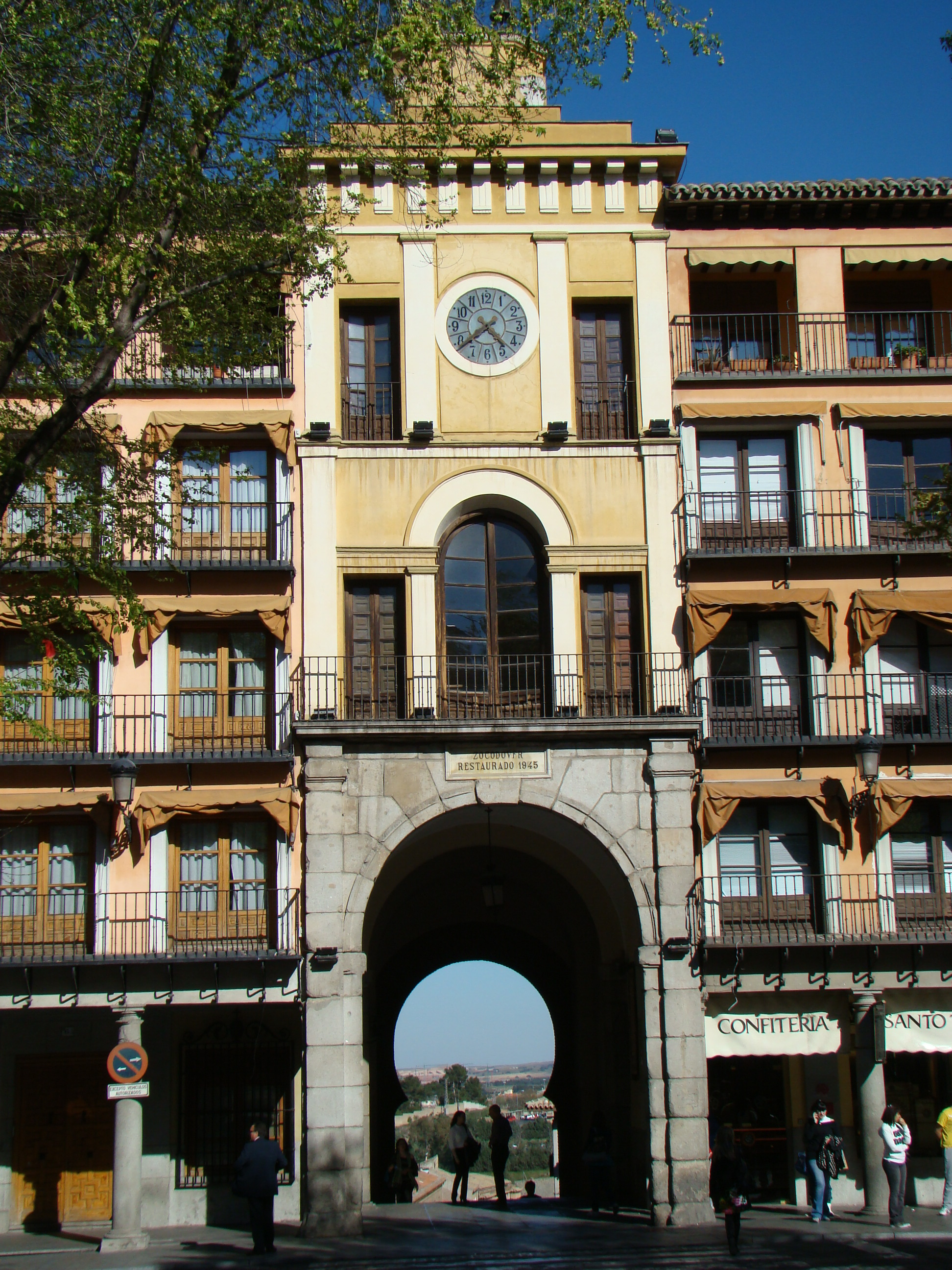
Arco de la Sangre

The Plaza de Zocodover is a square in the city of Toledo, in the autonomous community of Castile-La Mancha, Spain. It was the central hub of the city during most of its history, acting as its main square. Part of it was designed by Juan de Herrera during the reign of Philip II.

Horses, donkeys, foals, mares, mules and other animals were sold in the square when Toledo was a Spanish-Muslim city.

The city's most important market takes place here, as it has for centuries. Today it is held on Tuesdays in the vicinity of Paseo de Merchán or de la Vega.

== History ==
The origin of the name Zocodover comes from the Arabic language sūq ad-dawābb, which means "market of burden beasts". This place was also the place where bullfighting and the cucañas were organized as part of local celebrations. It has been, therefore, the main focus of the city's social life since medieval times. However, Zocodover has also played host to darker events like the autos-da-fé of the Inquisition or the public execution of the prisoners.

When the old square was destroyed by a fire on October 29 1589, the decision was taken to build a new one. In 1854 an ambitious project was drawn up by the technician Santiago Martín Ruiz, to reorganize the Plaza de Zocodover, transforming it into a rectangular portico square.

== Reforms ==
Several attempts have been made to widen the square, although of these two are most notable.

The first of these dates back to the time of the Catholic Monarchs, and was approved by Isabella of Castile herself in 1502. The proposal came from the Municipality of Toledo, authorising the square's remodelling, since the former square was too narrow, and since the Alcázar lacked an appropriate plaza they wanted to join both to the front facade of the building.

To do this, a wall was planned to bridge the gap to the postern of San Miguel and the proposal also stipulated its characteristics, among which it highlighted the construction of typical arcades of Castilian architecture.

This colossal work never came to fruition, as the technical capabilities of the time, combined with the steep slope from Zocodover to the main facade of the Alcázar, 23 meters high, made it extremely difficult. Furthermore, to level the ground would require digging into solid rock.

A second expansion attempt was successfully carried out at the beginning of the 17th century. This involved the demolition of a series of houses, deemed to be of little value, that blocked the view of the top of the square from the bottom and vice versa. No more arches were built, likely so as not to further constrict space on the square.

Nowadays, Zocodover is one of the city's main venues for events and celebrations. It also serves as a popular meeting point and is popular among the thousands of tourists who flock the historical quarter throughout the year.
