= Josep Renau =

Spanish artist and communist revolutionary (1907-1982)

Josep Renau Berenguer
- Born: 11 May 1907; Valencia, Spain
- Died: 11 November 1982 (aged 75); East Berlin, East Germany
- Education: Real Academia de Bellas Artes de San Carlos
- Known for: Painting, Mural, Graphic design, Photomontage
- Notable work: Tropic (1945), The American Way of Life (1952-1966)
- Spouse: Manuela Ballester

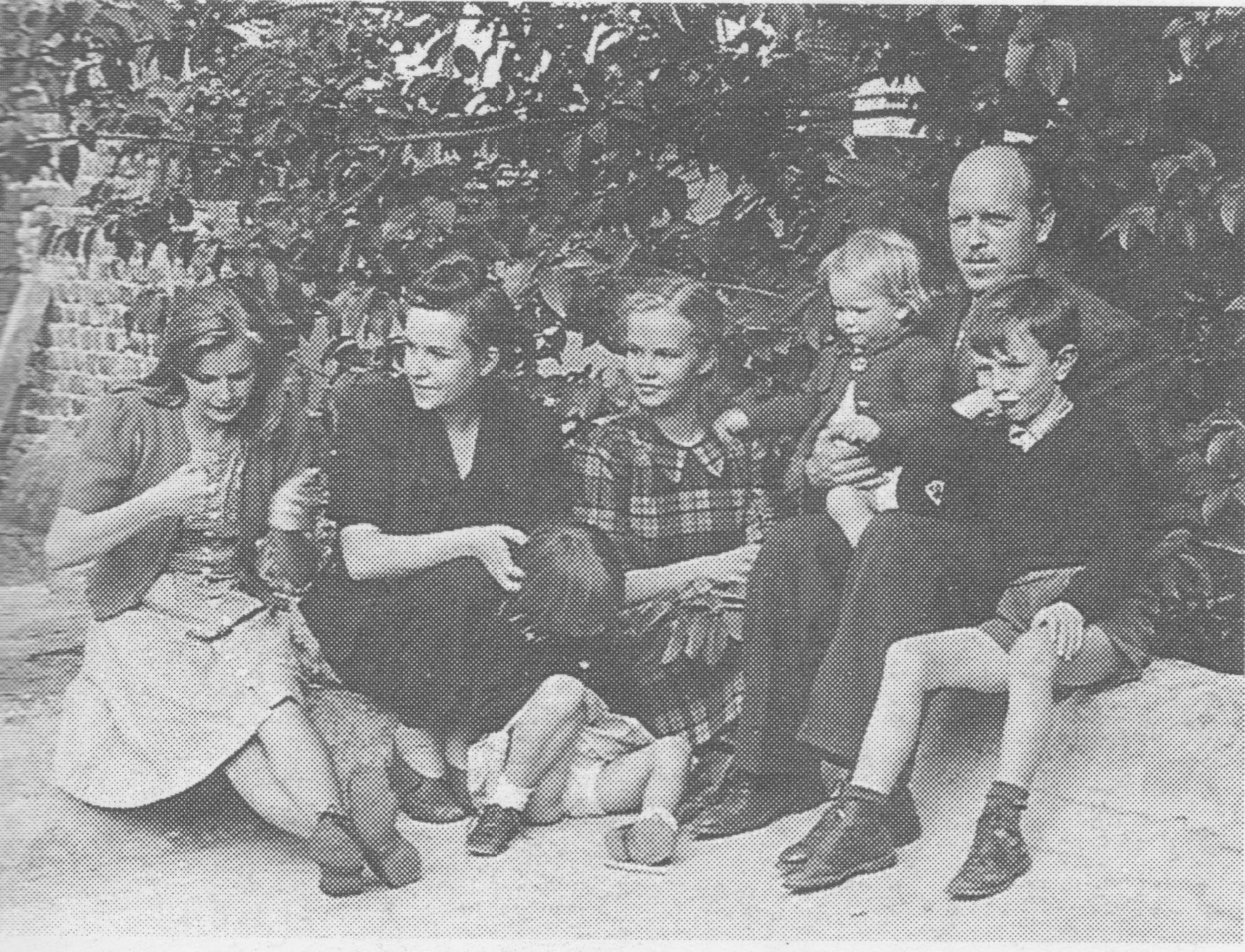
Manuela Ballester (second on the left) with her husband Josep Renau, her sisters Rosa and Fina and her three older sons in Mexico, 1941

Josep Renau Berenguer (17 May 1907 — 11 November 1982) was a Spanish artist and communist revolutionary, notable for his propaganda work during the Spanish Civil War. Among his production, he is remarkable for his art deco period, his political propaganda during the Spanish Civil War, the photomurals of the Spanish Pavilion in the International Exhibition of 1937 in Paris, a series of photomontages titled Fata Morgana or The American Way of Life, and murals and paintings made in Mexico, such as Tropic, dated in 1945.

== Biography ==
He was the son of José Renau Montoro, a drawing teacher at the San Carlos School of Fine Arts in Valencia, where he studied between 1919 and 1925. He alternated his studies with his work at Litografía D’Ortega, where he learned the lithographer's trade, which would later allow him to create a series of art deco style watercolors that he presented at the National Exhibition in Madrid in December 1928. He also worked as a photographer and muralist.

Renau was a member of the Communist Party of Spain since 1931 and became the founder of the Union of Proletarian Writers and Artists in 1932. His work began to take off with posters published to support the Republic during the Spanish Civil War. In September 1932 he married the painter Manuela Ballester. During that period, he was a professor of Fine Arts at the University of Valencia and president of the Board of the Pedagogical Missions. He was also graphic editor of the Valencia-based Orto magazine between 1932 and 1934.

In 1935, he and other left-wing Spanish Marxist intellectuals founded the magazine Nueva Cultura, which would remain active until 1937. In September 1936, he was named general director of Fine Arts. In this period, he commissioned Pablo Ruiz Picasso in 1937 to create a work for the Pavilion of the Spanish Republic at the International Exhibition of Arts and Techniques in Paris, which would result in Guernica. Likewise, he made a series of photomontages for the Pavilion. As part of his action as general director, he also created the National Orchestra of Spain and made the decision to transfer part of the Prado Museum's masterpieces to the Torres de Serranos in Valencia to save them from the bombings of Madrid. He later organized for the pieces to be transferred to Switzerland.

He held the position until the end of the war in 1939. At the end of the war, he went to France and was interned in the Argelès-sur-Mer concentration camp. In the same year, he obtained a visa to move to Mexico, where he worked for Spanish magazines in exile, continued designing posters for films, and collaborated with the well-known Mexican muralist David Alfaro Siqueiros. The murals at the Casino de la Selvain Cuernavaca, commissioned by Manuel Suárez y Suárez, date from this period.

In 1958, he left Mexico to settle in East Berlin, capital of the German Democratic Republic. There he created murals and photomontages such as Fata Morgana USA (1967) and The American Way of Life (1977). Benefiting from the general amnesty of 1976, he returned to Spain, later returning to Berlin, where he died in 1982. His funds were bequeathed to the Valencian Institute of Modern Art.
