= Arco de la Victoria =

Triumphal arch built in the Moncloa district of Madrid, Spain

Coordinates: 40°26′09″N 3°43′13″W

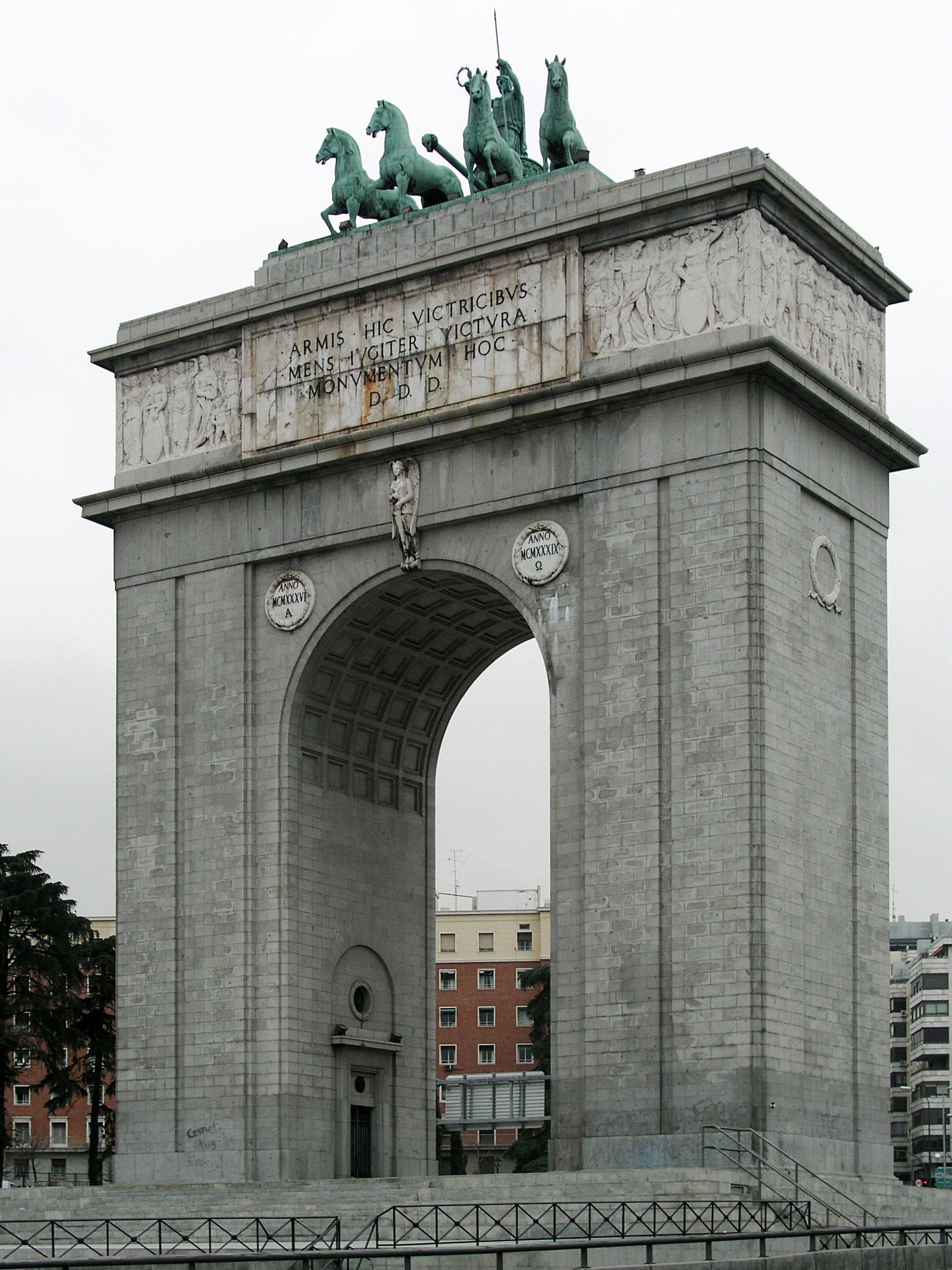
- Arco de la Victoria, Madrid
- Interactive map of the Arco de la Victoria area

General information
- Type: triumphal arch
- Location: Moncloa, Madrid, Spain
- Construction started: 1950
- Completed: 1956

Design and construction
- Architects: Modesto Lopez Otero and Pascual Bravo Sanfeliú

Other information
- Public transit: Príncipe Pío

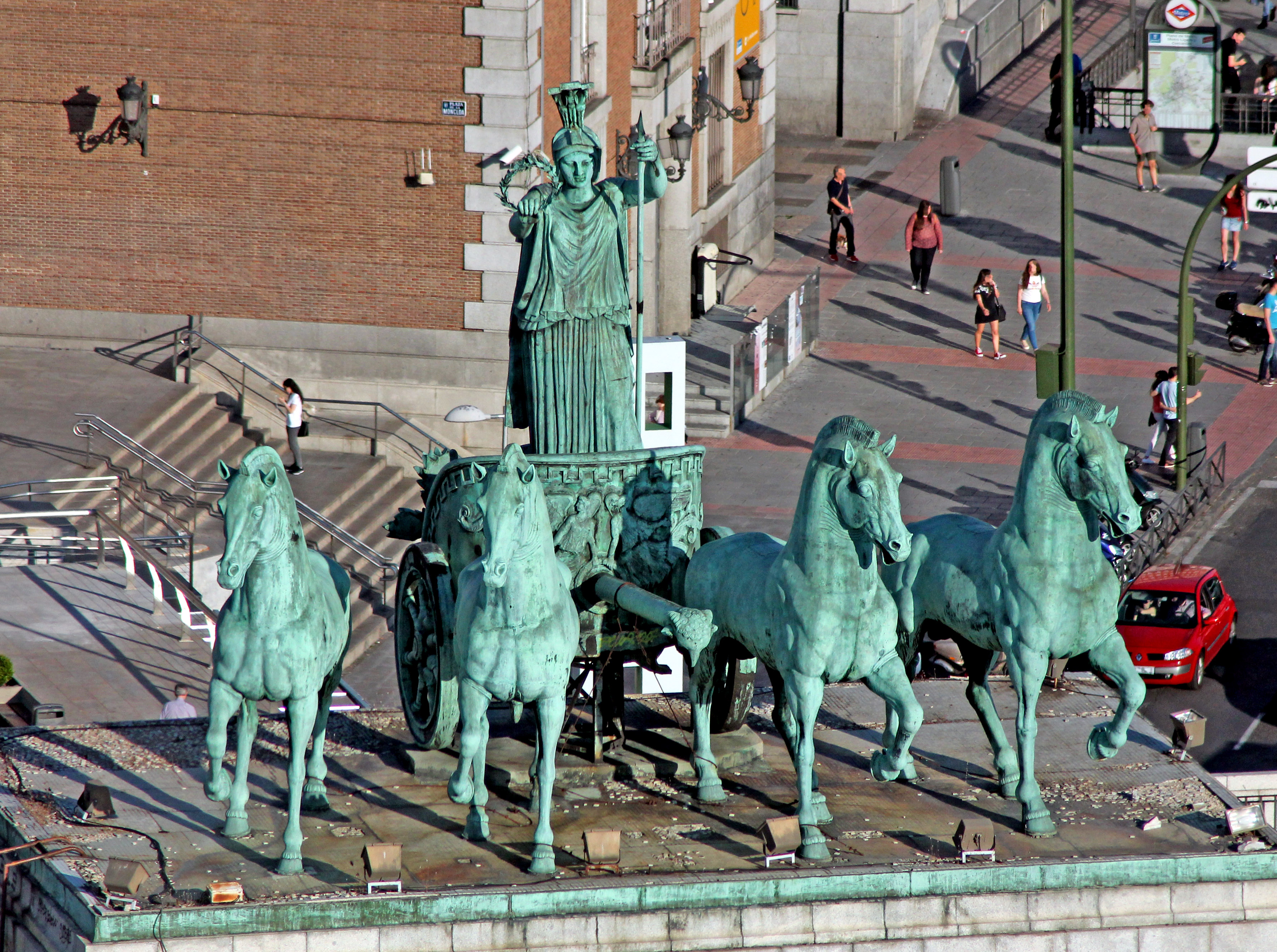
View of the chariot from the Faro de Moncloa

Arco de la Victoria ([ˈaɾko ðe la βiɣˈtoɾja], "Arch of Victory") is a triumphal arch built in the Moncloa district of Madrid, Spain. It is also known informally as the Puerta de Moncloa for its resemblance other Madrid landmarks, Puerta de Alcalá and Puerta de Toledo. The 49-m high arch was constructed at the behest of Francisco Franco to commemorate the victory of Francoist troops in the 1936 Battle of Ciudad Universitaria (Battle of the University City), part of the Spanish Civil War. The Arch has some Latin inscriptions that recall the Francoist victory and the construction of the new University City after it was destroyed in battle.

== Historical background ==
The location of the Arco de la Victoria has significance related to the Battle of the University City within the historical context of the Spanish Civil War. This battle lasted eight hundred and fifty-eight days from November 17, 1936 to March 28, 1939. The bloodiest part of the Siege of Madrid (also called the Defense or Battle of Madrid) occurred a few meters from the current location of the Arch.

In the Roman architectural tradition, triumphal arches were built to commemorate military victories and to greet victorious armies entering a city. Thus, this victory arch is unique in having been built on the battlefield's own land.

=== Early twentieth century ===
The University City, located in the Moncloa area, was an architectural and social project of King Alfonso XIII. This project was intended to benefit the city of Madrid by bringing many academic disciplines together in the area. It was decided that the University City would be located on a site owned by the Spanish government called "La Moncloa" and which at that time consisted of vacant land adjacent to the Casa de Campo, near the Manzanares River. On November 6, 1930, construction of the Faculties of Medicine, Pharmacy and Dentistry began. In 1932, the Clinical Hospital was built nearby. The arrival of the Second Spanish Republic kept alive the project of building a University in Madrid, and by 1936 classes had begun in some faculties of the University City.

The Modelo prison was also located nearby in a large block between Plaza de la Moncloa, Paseo de Moret, and Martín de los Heros and Romero Robledo streets. The large prison was destroyed during the civil war and subsequently dynamited. Its place today is occupied by the Air Force Headquarters. The prison was designed by architects Tomás Aranguren and Eduardo Adaro. Construction began in 1876 and the inauguration took place on December 20, 1883, although it was not occupied until May, 1884. The area now occupied by Avenida de la Concordia was an open area with an access road to the capital, the so-called Carretera de La Coruña, one of Madrid's main roads. In 1906, gardens were inaugurated in the area occupied by the Arch, up to the edge of the Modelo prison grounds.

=== Civil War (Battle of Madrid) ===
The coup d 'état of 17 and 18 July 1936 began a cascading uprising throughout Spanish territory that turned into an armed conflict. The uprising failed in Madrid, which remained loyal to the government of the Republic. The main objective of the rebel troops in the south of Spain was the surrender of Madrid in the shortest possible time. Thus, a rapid march towards the capital began. This led to the frontal attack of General Varela's troops on November 8, 1936, in which these troops entered the Casa de Campo with great military force. At the same time, they encountered resistance from the defenders, which caused the troops to move northwest to occupy the area between the University City and the Plaza de España. This initial frontal attack was very bloody on both sides and produced a slow advance through the Casa de Campo to the banks of the Manzanares River, where the assaulting troops needed to cross bridges strongly guarded by the defending militia troops. After troops passed through one of the bridges—the so-called "pasarela de la meurte" or walkway of death—on Tuesday, November 17, the battle of the University City began on the campus.

The battle was bloody because of the confrontation between troops determined to attack and a militia determined to resist and defend. The number of casualties on both sides was great; the city's field hospitals were filled with wounded and dead. On the 19th, the anarchist leader Buenaventura Durruti was mortally wounded by a gunshot in a place near the current site of the Arch. The front was finally stabilized, forming a long wedge with its point reaching the Clinical Hospital. Given that the defenders' resistance had halted advancement of the troops, and the terrible casualties for both sides, there was a meeting on November 23 at the Leganés Railway headquarters to review the situation. This meeting was attended by Franco and Generals Mola, Saliquet, and Varela. At the meeting, a new strategy was proposed, to end the frontal attack on the city and to stop making the occupation of Madrid the primary military objective.

The new strategy of isolating Madrid through enveloping maneuvers shifted the conflict's center of gravity, with the First Battle of the Carretera of La Coruña in December 1936 and the Battle of Jarama in February 1937. The wedge-shaped front remained throughout the rest of the Civil War, turning Madrid into a front of attrition in which all tactical possibilities were exhausted.

=== End of the war ===
The coup d 'état of Colonel Segismundo Casado on March 28, 1939 resulted in Franco's troops taking control of Madrid. At the end of the war, the idea of leaving the University City as a field of remembrance was considered, but discarded. The University City area was heavily damaged. Many of the campus buildings suffered serious damage due to the intensity of the combat and the large numbers of projectiles launched by both sides. Some of the buildings made of reinforced concrete remained intact, such as the Student Residence, the Board Pavilion and the Clinical Hospital. Some buildings suffered partial collapse, but the damage was not serious enough to prevent their subsequent reconstruction in 1940. The architect Luis Gutiérrez Soto was commissioned to create an urban plan to restore the Moncloa area by designing plans for the Ministry of Air, in the Plaza de la Moncloa (at that time called Plaza de los caídos por Madrid or Plaza of the Fallen for Madrid ).

== Description ==
This triumphal arch stands on a rectangular base of 130 m by 42 m (about 142 by 46 yards). It is supported by two rectangular structures. Its height is 42 m, not counting the 7 m added by Minerva's chariot on top. At the foot of each of the two side structures, there is an entrance accessed through a small door. From these entrance lobbies, you can access the top via a marble staircase with six intermediate landings. At the top, there are observation points in a central exhibition hall, which has never been used. The hall can also be accessed by elevators located in each of the two side lobbies.

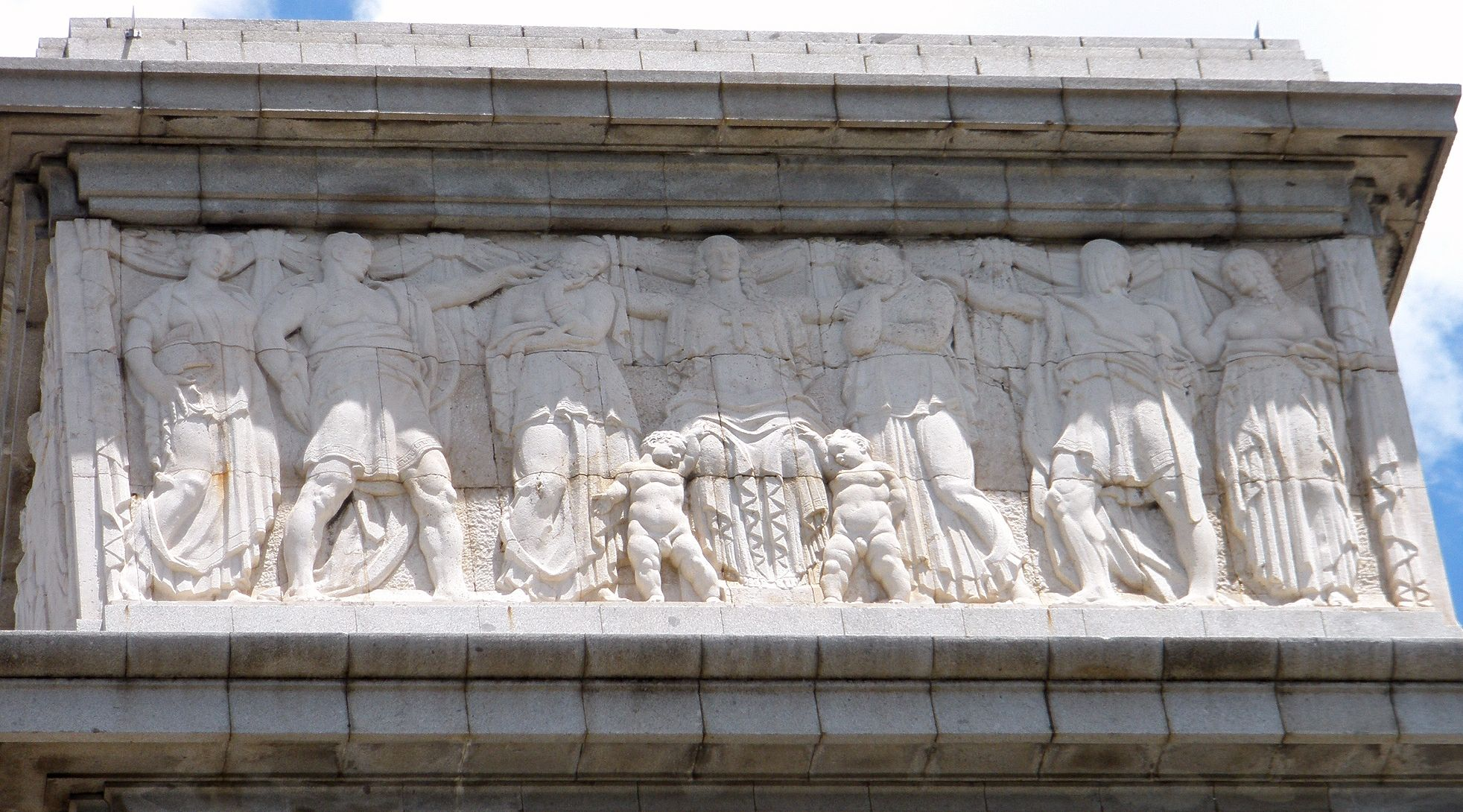
Bas relief frieze on the Arco de la Victoria

The sculptor Moisés de Huerta, from Valladolid, was in charge of making the neoclassical bas-relief of the frieze. He collaborated with his son, Rafael Huerta, and with José Ortells to create the bas-relief, which is made up of thirty-four allegorical figures. In the northern frieze, the figures represent military virtues, while those on the opposite side represent academic disciplines (literature, science and arts). The sides are the graphic expressions of the Latin inscriptions on the arch. On the west side, a winged Minerva touches the foreheads of two men with her hands, an allegory of intelligence: Mens iugiter victura. On the east side, a seated woman with a cross on her chest, an allegory of the University as a Catholic institution, welcomes those who approach her: florescit in conspectu Dei.

== Text ==
=== Northwest side ===
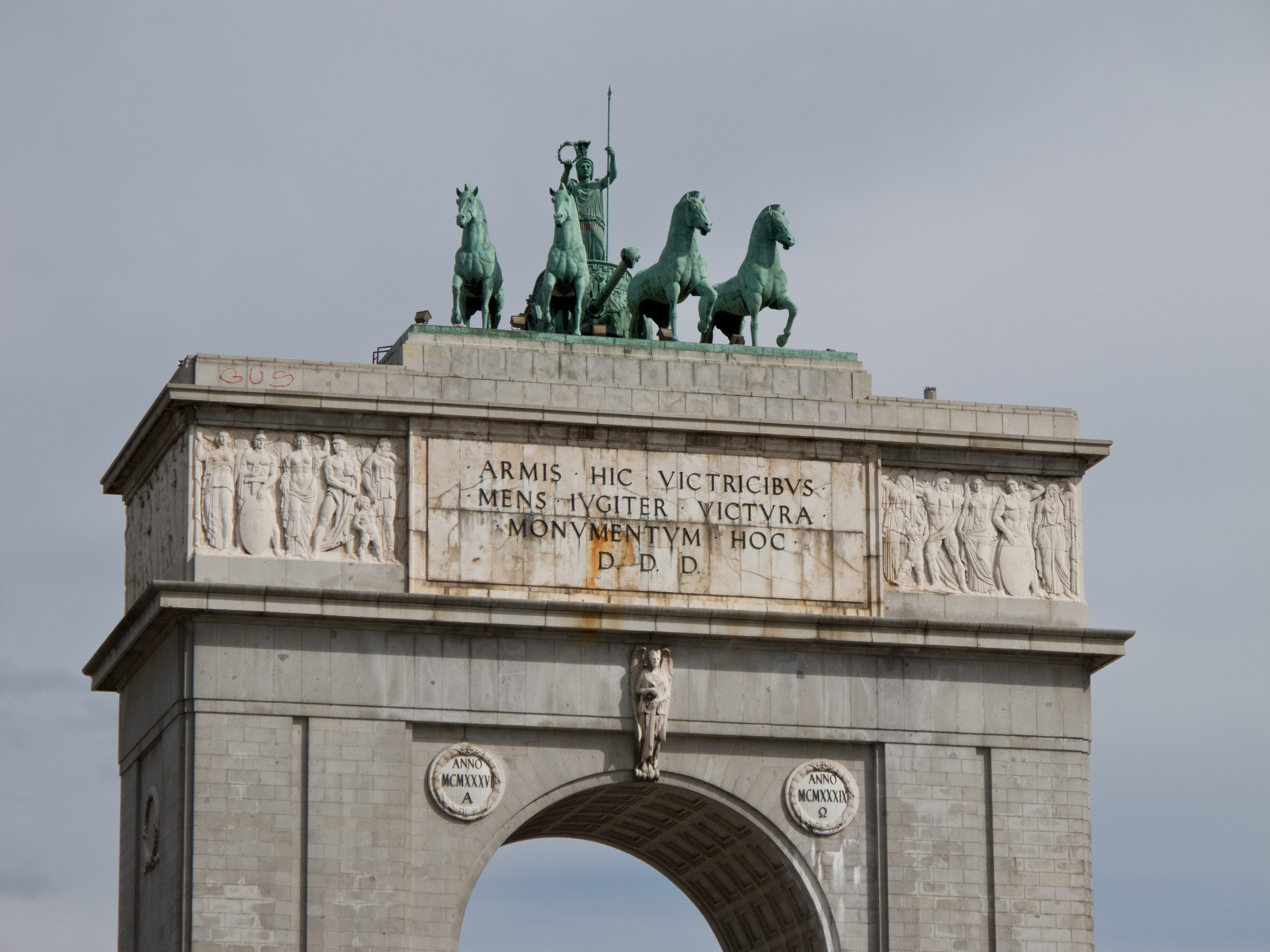
View of the northwest side with its inscription

The frieze on this side has ten figures. On the northwest frontispiece (front) that faces the University City, you can read the following Latin inscription:

ARMIS HIC VICTRICIBVS MENS IVGITER VICTVRA MONVMENTVM HOC D.D.D.

And below, on the face of two medallions crowned by laurel, you can see two years expressed in Roman numerals:

ANNO MCMXXXVI Α and ANNO MCMXXXIX Ω

The translation of the Latin inscription of this frontispiece is:

To the victorious arms, here the spirit destined to triumph eternally has given, offered, and dedicated this monument.

The abbreviation D.D.D. means "gives and dedicates" ("dat, dicat, dedicat"), the latter two Latin terms being synonymous). Another version of the meaning of D.D.D. is "dato decreto decurionum" ("granted by decree of the decurions", in this case referring to members of the city council of Madrid). The word VICTVRA is ambiguous and can mean the one who will overcome or the one who will live.

The years are 1936 and 1939, the beginning and end of the Spanish Civil War. The alpha and omega letters next to each number are the first and last letters of the Greek alphabet and traditionally represent the beginning and end of an event.

=== Southeast side ===
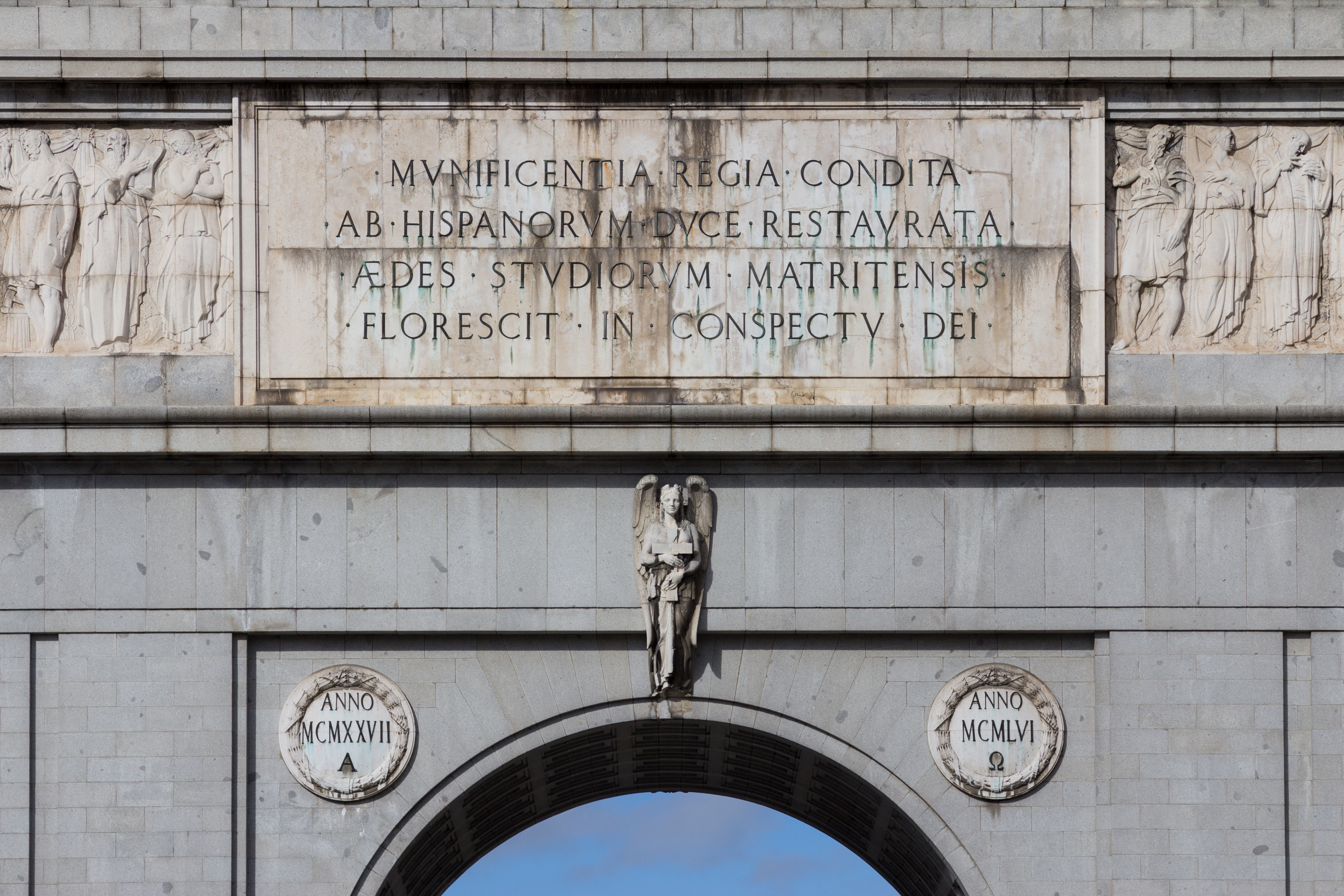
Southeast lettering

The frieze on this side also has ten figures. On the southeast frontispiece (rear) facing Moncloa (i.e. the city) it has the Latin inscription:

MVNIFICENTIA REGIA CONDITA AB HISPANORVM DVCE RESTAVRATA ÆDES STVDIORVM MATRITENSIS FLORESCIT IN CONSPECTV DEI

And below, in two crowned medallions, two years appear again in Roman numerals:

ANNO MCMXXVII Α and ANNO MCMLVI Ω

The English translation of this inscription is:

Founded by regal munificence, restored by the leader (Note: The Spanish title of the post is Caudillo; however, the Latin inscription translates it as Dux, a title more widely known by the Italian form Duce.) of the Spaniards, may the house of Madrid's studies flourish in the presence of God.

The inscription is interpreted to refer to the University City when it says "estudios matritenses", the place where the arch is located. The dates correspond to the dates when the construction of the campus began (alpha) and when its restoration was finished (omega) after the battle. The dates are 1927, when the construction of the University City began on the initiative of Alfonso XIII, and 1956 when the Arco de la Victoria was inaugurated.

== Construction ==
After the Spanish Civil War, the area where the Arch is now located was gradually restored and the Faculties of Philosophy and Letters, Sciences (Chemistry department) and Pharmacy, as well as Francisco Jiménez de Cisneros College were once again operational in 1942. The restoration work was slow due to the priority placed on restoring other areas of the city. Despite this, classes resumed in 1943 in the new University City. The site which four years earlier had been occupied by a battlefront was gradually being restored to its function as a university.

== The first sketches ==
The idea of a triumphal arch was born earlier, on February 26, 1942 in a session of the Permanent Commission of the Board of the University City. The Board Chair, José Ibáñez Martín, commissioned a design for a triumphal arch at the site. The architect Modesto López Otero responded to the initiative with a sketch whose original layouts and style would be maintained in future designs. In 1943, some aspects of the design work were finalized, improving on the initial ideas and sketches. The general idea of the project was already clear, with the basic design of a classicist triumphal arch presided over by an equestrian statue of Francisco Franco. However, the project was set aside due to lack of budget and the need for other, more essential, public works after the war. Also, the Latin inscriptions of both frontispieces that were suggested in the first sketches had nothing to do with those that were eventually carved. It is assumed that the author of those inscriptions was Pedro Laín Entralgo.

The next time the project moved forward was in 1946. The Head of Public Works launched a consultation with the Board in 1946 for a project to modify the entrance to the city and the site of the "Arco de Triunfo" in honor of Francisco Franco and the Spanish Army. The question was whether or not to build the arch. The Board of the University City ratified the proposal in its Standing Committee meeting on May 16, 1946. This event gave the green light to the construction project at the main entrance to the city of Madrid. The work got off to a slow start due to a limited budget. The main person in charge of the work was Modesto López Otero, assisted by Pascual Bravo Sanfeliú. The design work concluded on November 17, 1948 and the plans were sent to the architect of the Civil Construction Board, Luis Bellido, who gave his approval.

=== Construction work ===
The first foundation work began in 1950 and was completed in one year. The project was progressing slowly and it was not until the Minister of Education, Joaquín Ruiz-Giménez, gave his support to ensure that most of the work--excepting decorative elements--would be completed by 1955. Its final cost was eight million pesetas.

=== Finishing touches ===
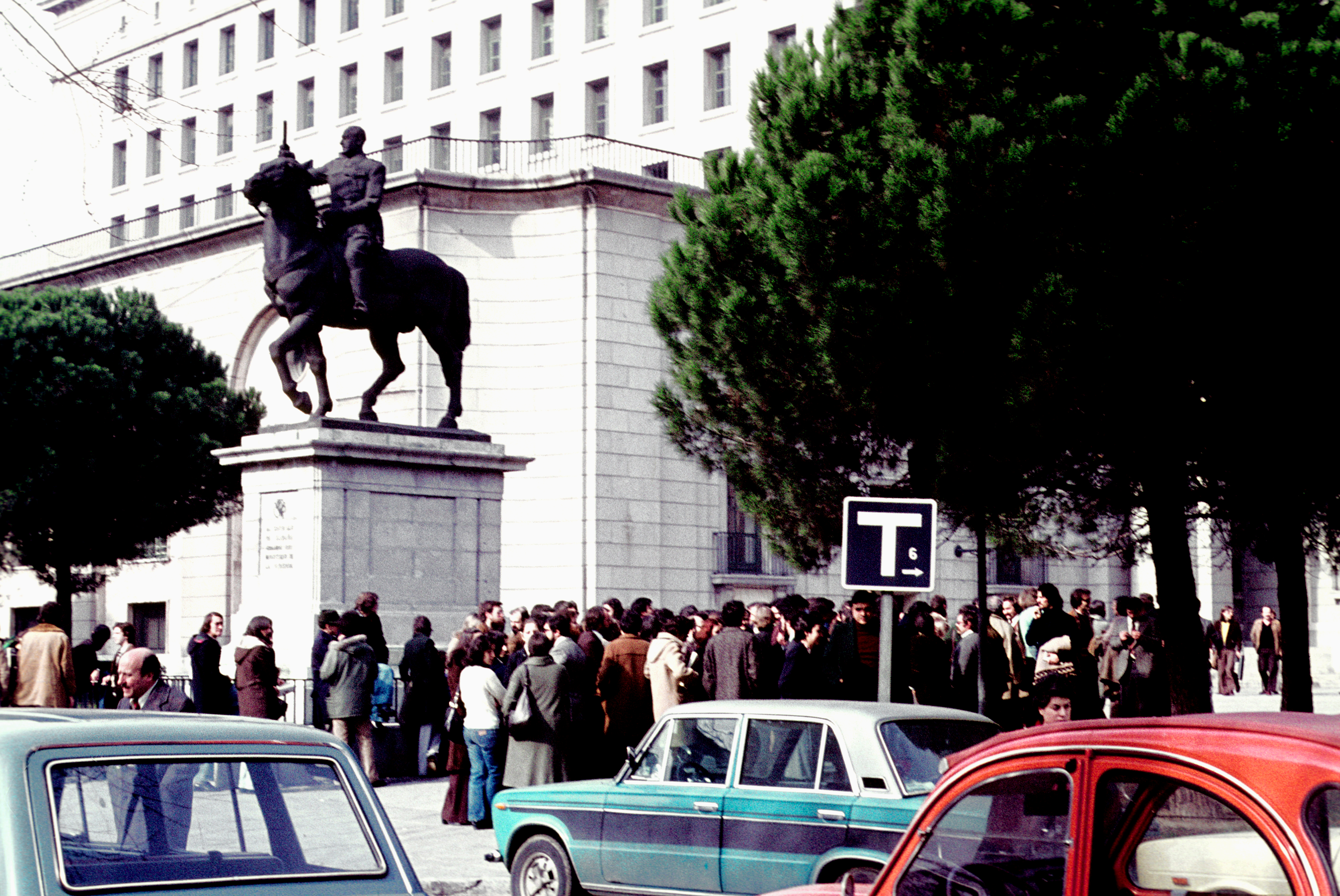
Francisco Franco's equestrian statue at Nuevos Ministerios in 1976.

Surprisingly, the Arco de la Victoria was never officially inaugurated. The sculptural ornamentation was commissioned on July 12, 1951 from the sculptor from Valladolid, Moisés de Huerta, who would be in charge of making the sculptures of the allegorical classicist-style bas-reliefs of the frieze. Moisés de Huerta was also commissioned to make an equestrian statue of Francisco Franco dressed as a general, to be placed in the open space at the front of the Arch facing the University City. In fact, this equestrian statue was never placed at the Arch; it was placed in front of the Ministry of Housing.

Similarly, on November 14, 1953, José Ortells López was commissioned to create the winged victory sculptures for the keystones of the arch. The chariot placed on top is the work of Ramón Arregui Sagarzazu and was the ornament that took the longest to finish. Some sources claim he was assisted by the Valencian sculptor José Capuz in some decorative elements of the chariot (quadriga). Copper cladding was commissioned on August 30, 1955, but it was difficult to install due to a copper shortage. In July 1956, work continued on seemingly endless finishing touches, waiting for an inauguration that would never come. At some point in the 1970s, the space inside the arch was used to store part of the archives of the Technical University of Madrid.

A nearby building commemorating those fallen for Madrid (now used by the Municipal Board of the Moncloa-Aravaca District) was initially planned by the Madrid City Council on May 29, 1949 as a tribute to the fallen, in homage to the battle of Madrid. The winner of the competition, entitled Caídos por Dios y por España (Fallen for God and for Spain) was the popular Madrid architect Manuel Herrero Palacios. On October 29, 1954, the first stone of this building was laid. However, this building, which was planned to accompany the Arch, was not completed according to the architect's initial specifications.

==== Updates ====
In February 1987, the Arch was cleaned and restored.

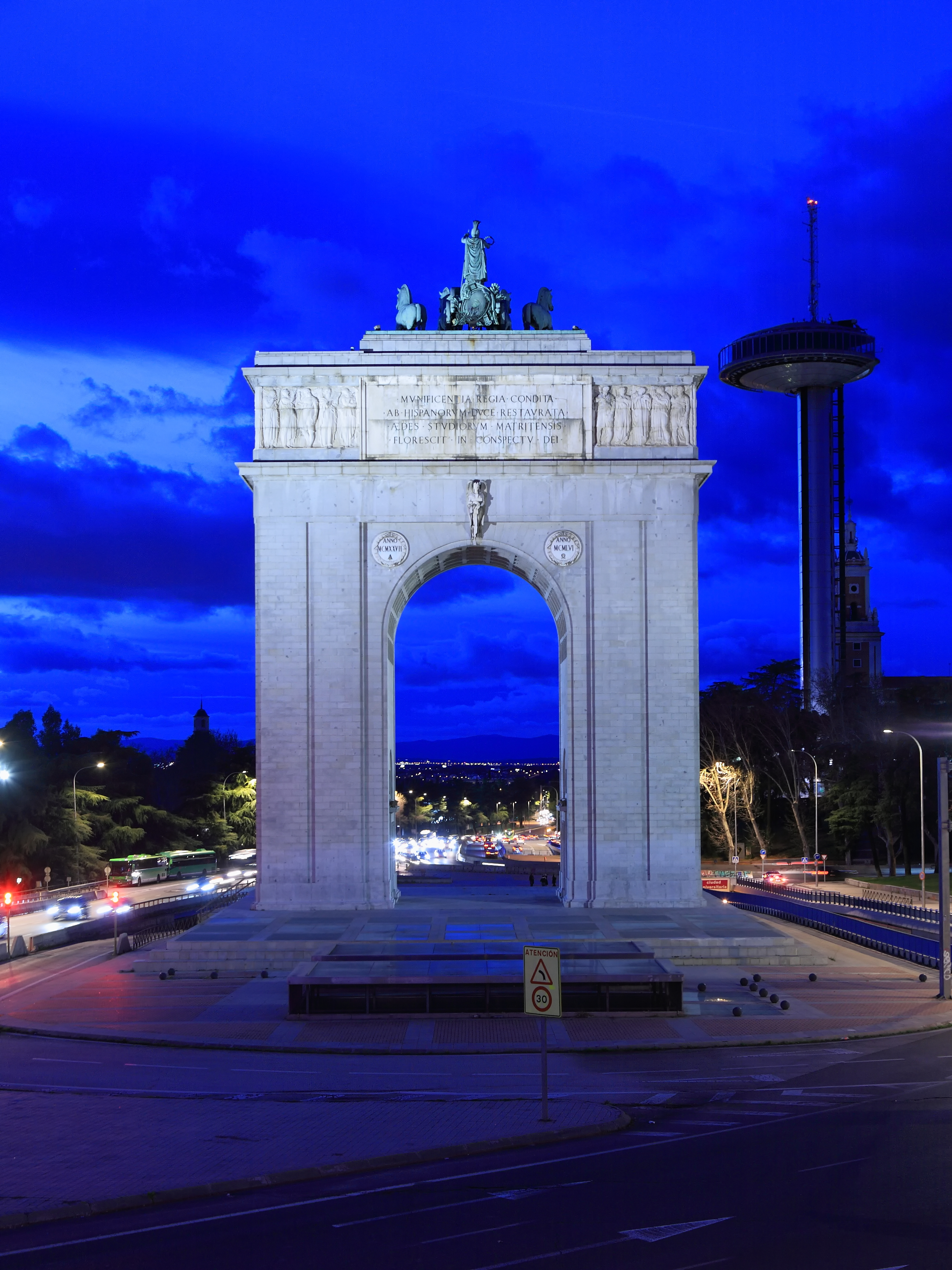
Arco de la Victoria at night, with Faro de Moncloa visible to the right.

In 1990, the Madrid architect Salvador Pérez Arroyo designed the Faro de Moncloa. This tower was completed in 1992. It reaches 110 m (about 120 yards), approximately sixty meters higher than the Arco de la Victoria. Access to the tower's crescent-shaped observation area is through two exterior glass elevators. In 2015 it was reopened for tourism.

During the term of Mayor Manuela Carmena (2015-2019), the Arch was known as Arco de la Memoria (Arch of Memory).

=== Abandonment and restoration ===
In the years prior to 2024, the monument suffered considerable deterioration due to lack of maintenance and environmental and human causes (damage, dirt, graffiti ...). However, the Madrid City Council and the Complutense University of Madrid, which owns the land where it is located, reached an agreement in 2023 to restore it, returning the Arch to a suitable state of preservation and putting it at the service of the public. The City Council hoped to establish requirements by the second quarter of 2024 and proceed with the tender and execution during 2025. There is discussion of renaming the Arch to Arco de la Concordia (Arch of Harmony), and the street where it is located has already been renamed to Avenida de la Concordia on December 12, 2024.

== See also ==
- List of post-Roman triumphal arches
- Fascist architecture
