= Battle of Ciudad Universitaria =

Battle in the Spanish Civil War

Coordinates: 40°26′38″N 3°43′34″W

- Part of the Siege of Madrid of the Spanish Civil War
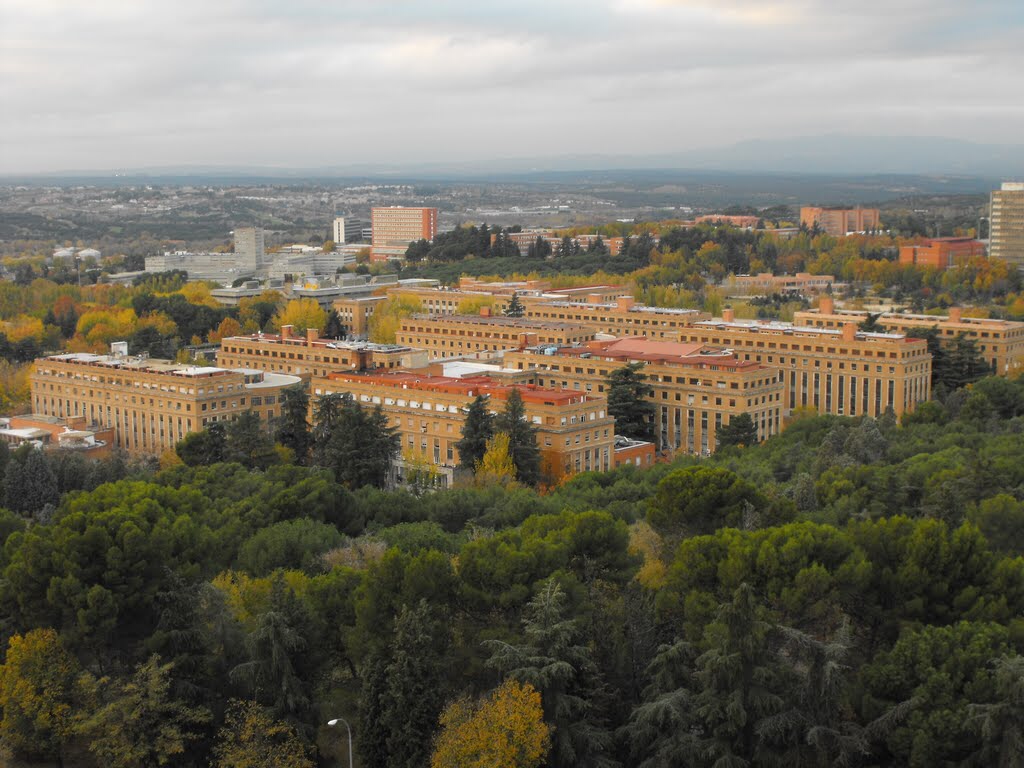
- General view of the University City.
| Date | 15–23 November 1936 |
| Location | Ciudad Universitaria, Madrid, Spain |
| Result | Republican victory |

Belligerents
| (Spain) Spanish Republic; International Brigades; Durruti Column | (Francoist Spain) Nationalist Spain |

Commanders and leaders
| (Spain) José Miaja Menant (Spain) Vicente Rojo (Spain) Carlos Romero Giménez (Spain) Jesús Martínez (MIA); Emilio Kléber; Paul Lukács; Jose B. Durruti † | (Francoist Spain) Francisco Franco (Francoist Spain) Carlos Asensio Cabanillas (Francoist Spain) Francisco Delgado (WIA) (Francoist Spain) Mohamed Meziane (WIA) |

Strength
| Central Army • 11,000; International Brigades • 1,800; Durruti Column • 1,400 militiamen | Army of Africa • 3,000 regulares • 18 light tanks |

Casualties and losses
| High | High |

The Battle of Ciudad Universitaria was a battle at the beginning of the Siege of Madrid in the Spanish Civil War. The battle happened at the new campus of the Ciudad Universitaria from 15 to 23 November 1936. The battle caused the frontline in this part of Madrid to stabilize for most of the war. The republican militias' objective was the defense of the capital at all costs, and for that it was necessary to stop the advance of General Varela's troops of the Army of Africa. Conversely, the attackers aimed to conquer the city as fast as possible. The persistence and tenacity of both sides in the battle meant an inflection point in the Spanish Civil War, partly because it was the first time that Franco's troops were stopped. The campus was also one of the most long-lasting confrontation points during the Spanish Civil War. The resistance shown in Madrid raised the morale on other fronts of the Republican government's controlled zone.

The end of the battle on 23 November 1936 was caused by a change in strategy by the attackers. The confrontation involved the participation of troops that belonged to the newly formed International Brigades, as well as heavy military materiel from the Soviet Union. The attackers received materiel and troops from Germany and Italy. The battle was one of the first times in history in which aerial bombing was used against a civilian population.

On 8 November 1936, General Varela's planned frontal assault started with an initial approach to the Casa de Campo. This attack moved the focal point of the attack to the northeast to occupy the zone between Ciudad Universitaria and Plaza de España. This first frontal attack was very bloody on both sides and involved a slow advance of the central axis of effort through the Casa de Campo to a stream of the river Manzanares. At the stream, the attackers saw the necessity of advancing through the bridges held by the militia troops. After various failed attempts to cross the Manzanares, they reached the other side through the space between two bridges. The battle itself started on 15 November, spreading the conflict throughout the campus. The fierce violence for occupying the city and the determination to stop the advance remained on both sides. Both sides began to run out of tactics as the death count rose, and the battle was carried out between the faculties and diverse buildings on the campus. Fighting inside the buildings, room by room, floor by floor characterized the confrontation. After a whole week of intense fighting and slow advance, General Franco had a meeting on the Cuartel General de Leganés, and on 23 November, the attackers' strategy changed: they would indirectly attack Madrid with a maneuver on the Las Rozas-Húmera axis (nowadays a neighborhood in Pozuelo de Alarcón) less than 2 kilometers northeast of the campus, which gave way to other battles like the Battle of Jarama (February 1937) and later the Battle of Guadalajara (March 1937). The campus' front line was wedge-shaped, with the Clínico at the tip, and remained practically the same for the rest of the war. Even though the front stayed the same, there was a fierce battle in the Ciudad Universitaria and Parque del Oeste with mines and countermines, all with unsuccessful infantry offensives until 28 March 1939, when the colonel Segismundo Casado surrendered the city to the attacking troops.

As a result of the battle, the campus and adjacent parts of the city were severely damaged. Ironically, the buildings were never used as a university but instead as a battlefield. It was not until years later that it was possible to do normal academic activities in some buildings. The war caught the university in the middle of a transition period, since many of the faculties that were in the urban center were slowly integrating with the newly-built campus. The war came unexpectedly, and the facilities were used for battle instead of for education. After the war, the Nationalist authorities reconstructed the university, rebuilding many of the sections during the 1940s. Several monuments were also built, dedicated to the commemoration of the victory of Franco's army, including the Arco de la Victoria built between 1950 and 1956 and the Monumento a Los Caídos Por España (nowadays the headquarters of the Junta Municipal del Distrito de Moncloa-Aravaca). The scars that the battle left have been hidden by the reconstruction of the faculties and the rebuilding of the surrounding Moncloa-Aravaca district, as well as the consequences of the urbanization of the 1970s, and remodeling projects like the burying of the M-30 and the creation of parks on the shore of the Manzanares like Madrid Río.

== Setting ==
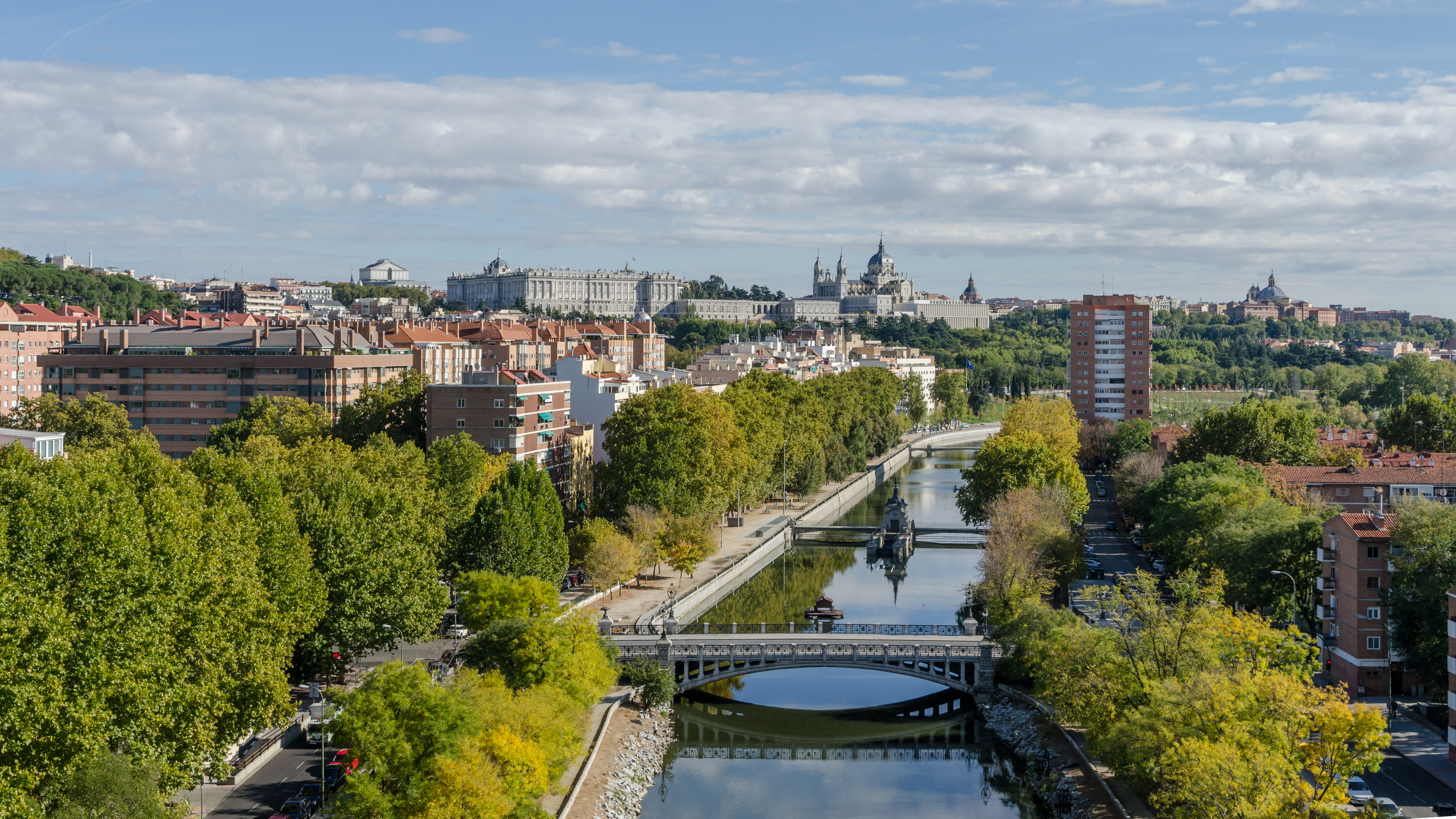
The Manzanares was a natural battlefront; its bridges were a high value military objective for both sides.

The Ciudad Universitaria is an urban space near Moncloa. Its original concept was a social and architectural project, an initiative of King Alfonso XIII at the beginning of the 20th century. The project aimed to give Madrid a condensed area with all the faculties, nine research labs, and a student dormitory. It was also a way to amplify the University of Alcalá's offerings. It was finally decided to establish the Ciudad Universitaria on an area of state property called La Moncloa. The construction started, and the company in charge was Agromán. The faculties of Medicine, Pharmacy, and Odontology began on 6 November 1930. The construction of the Hospital Clínico began in 1932 and continued until the civil war stopped the construction of this and other buildings in the vicinity. The inauguration plans and the start of the school year were initially scheduled for the final months of 1936, but social unrest and constant labor problems delayed the construction and inauguration.

=== La Ciudad Universitaria ===
In August 1936, due to rumors of troops advancing towards Madrid, academic activities were suspended in wait for "new events". Administrative activity was ongoing, but in a very limited capacity due to the instability of the situation. The professors and the workers of the Universidad Central moved to Valencia in November. Until 5 November, suspicions that this would be the location of the attack on Madrid did not arise. The military cartography used by both sides to describe the theater of operations corresponds to sheet 559 IV (quadrant 5E) of the Plano Director ('Master Plan') of Pozuelo de Alarcón prepared in the Talleres del Ministerio de la Guerra (lit. 'Workshops of the Ministry of War') in August 1937.

Although the campus was still under construction when the battle started, it had plenty of buildings, with part of the facilities almost operational. From the beginning of November the area became a prolonged battlefield, and many of its buildings were seriously damaged in the battle, the philosophy and letters faculty being the most affected. The testimonies of the destruction were gathered from brigade members who fought in the war, like John Sommerfield, Dan Kurzman, Bernard Knox, and writers like Marta Torres Santo Domingo. The revolting army occupied three-quarters of the university on 23 November. During the rest of the conflict, many trenches, gun nests, refuges of all types, and bunkers were built throughout the campus area, even though the front suffered almost no changes. The mine war's final ending completely modified the area's terrain.

Starting on the banks of the Manzanares, the buildings of the Ciudad Universitaria were scattered in a slight uphill slope. The battle occurred with the defending army at a higher altitude than the attackers. There were a few buildings in the area, despite only having been built four faculties (Medicine, Pharmacy, Science and Philosophy) and the Architecture, Veterinary and Agrarian Engineers. Over the Parque del Oeste, there was the National Sanity Institute, the Veterinary School, the Antirrabies Department, and the Fundación del Amo (a student's residence for American students with a capacity of 100 students) and the Student's Residency. In a more northern position, the Palacete de la Moncloa and the Monumento a Los Héroes de las Campañas Coloniales (disappeared nowadays). In the back is a group of buildings, with the Hospital Clínico being the most notable. Behind it, there was Madrid's urban area. In 1936, Madrid's urban zone from around this area was an uninterrupted series of plots of land. Thanks to the operations of the combat engineers colonel Tomás Ardiz Rey in collaboration with Carlos Masquelet, the Casa de Campo, the Moncloa zone and the Ciudad Universitaria became stronger.

=== The Casa de Campo and Manzanares' bridges ===
The Casa de Campo was entirely enclosed by a Toledan wall covering its exterior. Its outline was created by Francesco Sabatini, and it was the private park model for the royal pleasure it had been used for until 1931. There were around ten entries all along the wall; the only two nearby were the river and the angel ones. Between the Casa de Campo and the Ciudad Universitaria, the Manzanares' river bed in 1936 had abundant vegetation from the Pardo mountain. The Manzanares' was channeled from the Toledo Bridge to the Franceses Bridge, which meant that from the Franceses until the San Fernando bridge was not conducted. The channeled zone was heavily defended, was very dangerous for the attacking forces' infantry, and made the passing of the tanks difficult. Because of these reasons, the channeled zone was avoided, advancing a few meters up from the Franceses' bridge, where it was relatively more straightforward for attacking forces to move. This configuration of the unchanneled river directed the combat definitively towards the Ciudad Universitaria on 15 November 1936. The Manzanares' river, which has a low flow in summer, on the contrary is at its highest point in autumn.

On the Manzanares' two banks, there were two wide roads. The one on the right bank was the road to Castilla, the one on the left bank lowers through the Parque del Oeste and continues until the Puerta de Hierro and formed part of the National Circuit of Firmes Especiales. Various bridges of necessary strategic valor connect the two banks. The three bridges closer to Ciudad Universitaria are the San Fernando (the road to A Coruña), the Nuevo bridge (for railway use), and in parallel, just a few meters away, the Franceses (roadway to Irún). The rest of the bridges were immersed in the center of dispersed populations still part of Madrid. There were also a few footbridges all along the river. Some protagonist bridges in the battle were made into viaducts to save the slope of the roads and the roadway systems. For example, the viaduct of the Quince Ojos that supported the road to La Coruña (surpassing the hill of the Cantalasranas stream), just like the Aire bridge.

The battle occurred in the first months of the Civil War in the University City of Madrid, at the new campus of Madrid's Complutense University. It lasted for about a week, between 15 and 23 November 1936, after which the front stabilized until the war's end. The Republican militias aimed to defend the capital at any price, stop the advances of General José Varela columns, and prevent the fall of Madrid into Nationalist hands.

On the other hand, the attacking armies of the military rebellion aimed to "take the city" within the shortest possible time. This battle signaled the beginning of a new phase in the Spanish Civil War. Until then, the Francoist troops had been advancing relatively unopposed across Spain, conquering large swathes of territory in a few months. But here, at the Ciudad Universitaria, they encountered fierce and relentless opposition for the first time.

== See also ==
- List of Spanish Republican military equipment of the Spanish Civil War
- List of Spanish Nationalist military equipment of the Spanish Civil War
