= Botellón =

Spanish public drinking activity

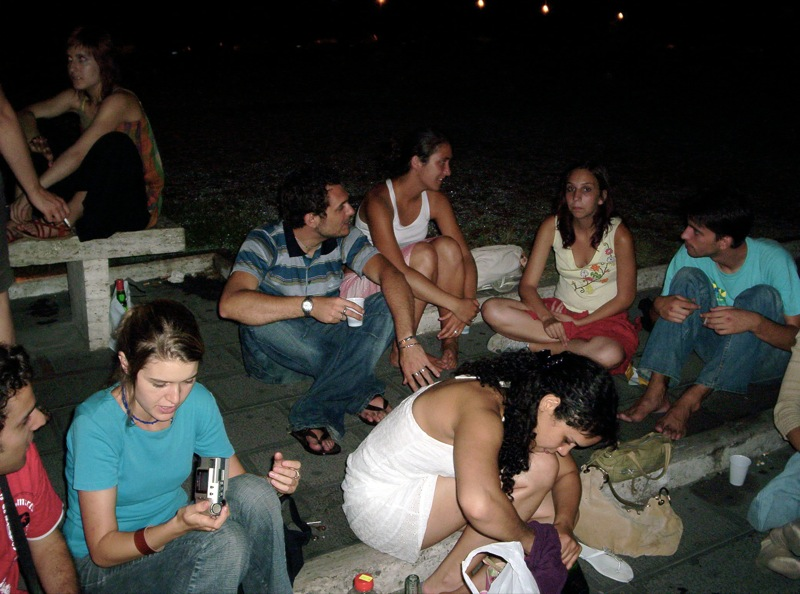
Nighttime botellón of Spanish youths visiting Rome (2006)

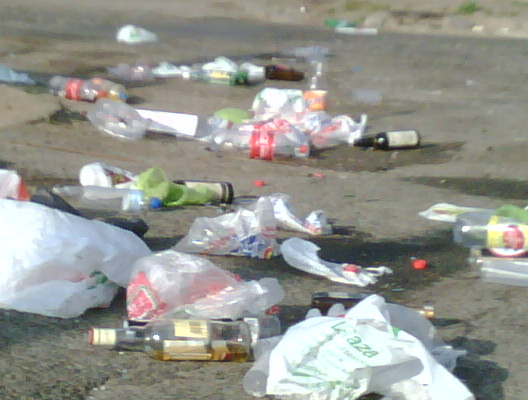
Common scene after botellón (2009)

Botellón (pronounced [boteˈʎon]; Spanish for "big bottle") is a Spanish activity when people congregate in public areas to socialize while drinking alcohol. The activity is popular among teenagers and young adults partly in response to rising drink prices at bars or clubs, and partly because more people can meet in one place. Botellón is not an alternative to typical nightlife, but is rather an economical way to drink with people before going out to bars, discos, or clubs.

== Origins ==
The origins of botellón trace back to Andalusia in the 1980s. Workers began buying alcohol to drink outdoors in areas such as plazas or parks instead of spending money in a bar or club. Young people, especially students, adopted the concept of botellón in the mid 1980s and it is thought to have first appeared in the city of Punta Umbría (Huelva, Spain). It is believed botellón has a correlation to an earlier closing times of nightclubs and bars. However, today, botellón is a common and accepted custom and is sometimes even regulated in cities.

== Characteristics ==
Botellón usually begins around 11:00 p.m. and ends around 3:00 a.m. when many people move to a bar or club.

Participants of botellón are typically young ranging from young teenagers to young adults. The majority of participants are male, who make up about 58% of the group, while the other 42% are female, with over two-thirds of them (70%) taking part in botellón on a weekly basis.

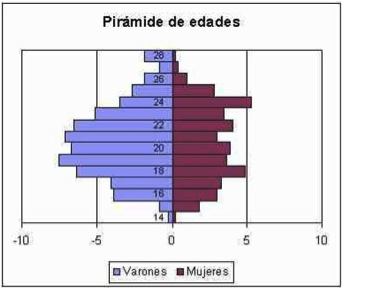
Statistics that show the relationship between botellón participation, gender and age.

According to a study, "El Fenómeno del Botellón", that compares the Spanish autonomous communities of Madrid, Galicia, and Jaéns' botellón phenomena, the more popular drinks during botellón are mixed drinks, kalimotxo (wine mixed with soda) and beer, while the less favorable drinks are cider, wine and champagne. Furthermore, the heavy consumption of alcohol during botellón has raised some concerns, and according to statistics, 64.2% are drinking the entire botellón while only 5.9% are not drinking at all.

Another common practice during botellón is cigarette smoking. There is no concrete evidence as to the relation of smoking and drinking, but one belief is because as participants reach the age to purchase alcohol they also reach the age to purchase cigarettes. Another issue of botellón is the use of cannabis. However, there is only speculation about its use and is believed not to be as prevalent as drinking or cigarette smoking.

The most common side-effects of botellón are headaches, loss or increase in appetite, insomnia and lack of energy the following day.

== Opposition ==
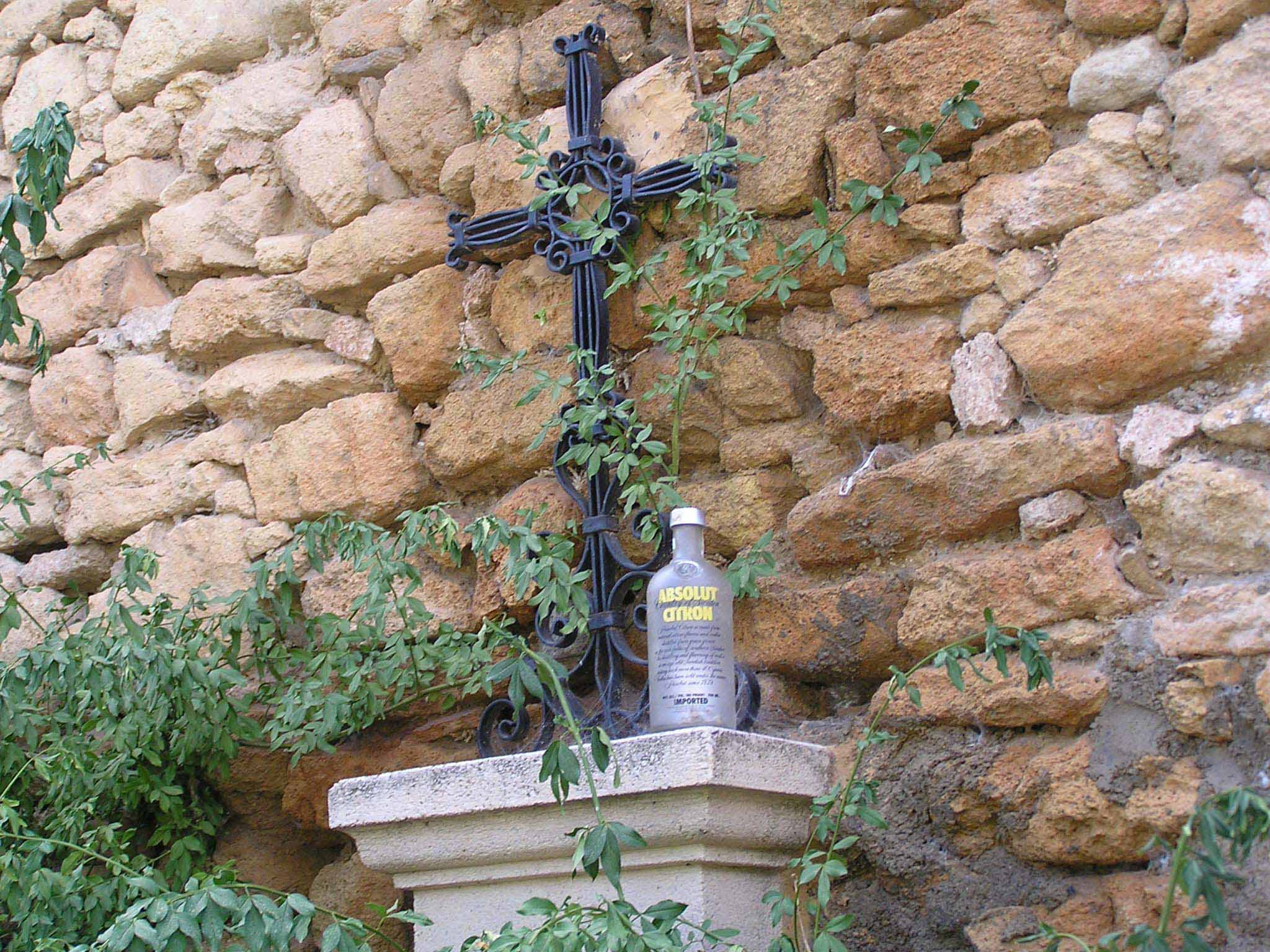
An abandoned empty vodka bottle after a botellón.

There are some health, social and economic concerns surrounding botellón. Because prohibition of drinking in the streets depends on the autonomous communities of Spain, botellón is illegal in some communities while it is not a problem in others. Although Andalusia, a southern autonomous community of Spain, prohibited public drinking in December 2006, botellón is still most common in the south of Spain because the weather is relatively warm all year round.

Major problems of botellón are the following:

1. Noise: Because participants gather in the streets and other public areas, the noise can disturb surrounding residents and citizens. Also, loud music contributes to the amount of noise, which is one reason why participants have begun moving to less populated areas in cities.
2. Vandalism: The intoxicated participants of a botellón may potentially leave trash or vandalize a public area and because botellón occurs in public spaces, the city's cleaning crews have to clean it up, which can cause frustration and anxiety with non-participants. In response to these problems, some municipal authorities have appointed special cleaning plans and attempted to charge participants a fine to offset the costs.
3. Economic issues: The higher cost of drinks in clubs and bars makes it difficult for young people with little or no income to go out to a bar or club and drink. Instead, they buy alcohol at lower prices from a store and participate in a botellón.

== Countermeasures ==
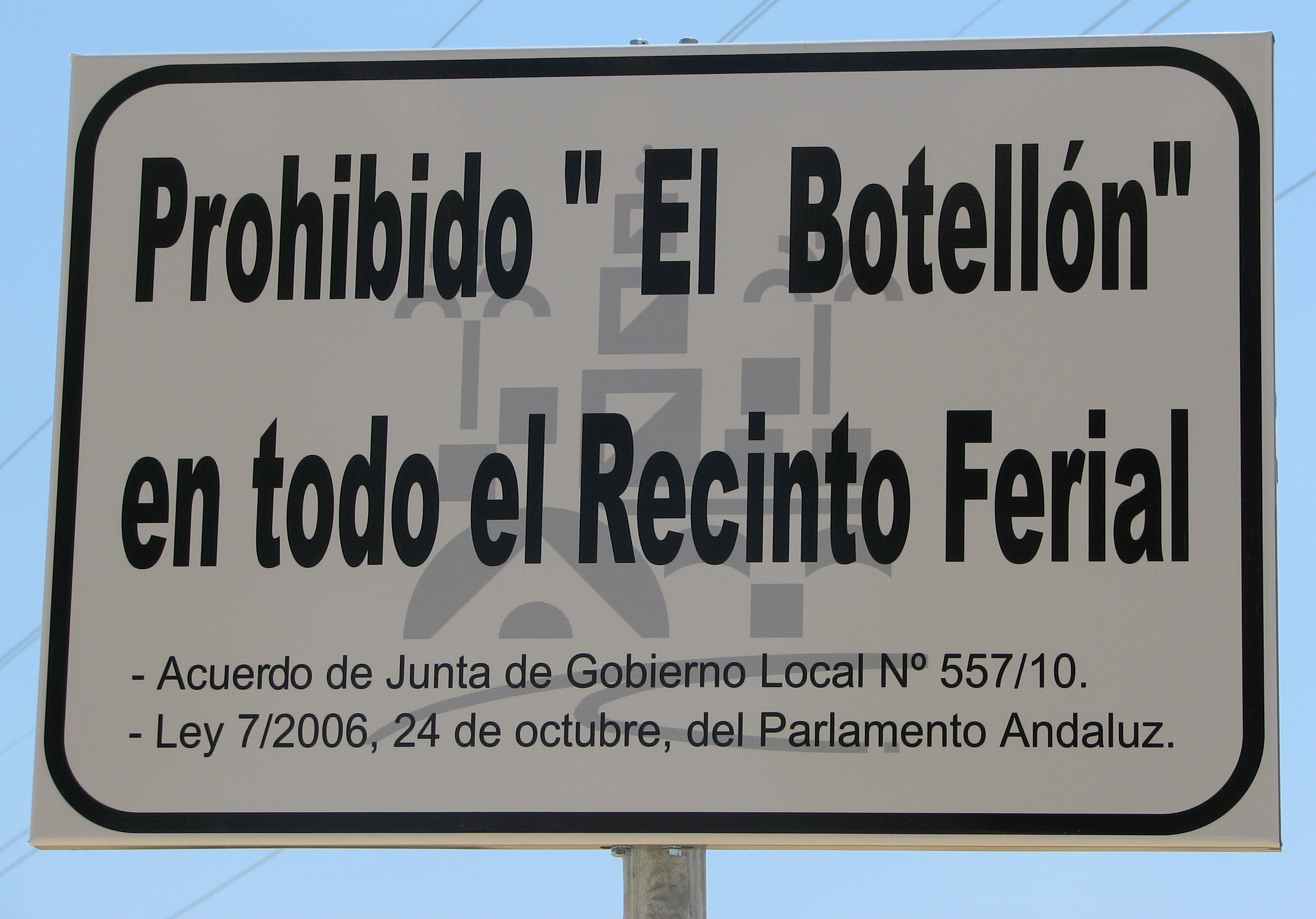
Sign prohibiting botellón in Cordoba, Spain.

Since botellón is usually a nighttime activity, Spain passed a law that prohibits stores to sell alcohol to the public after 10:00 p.m, hoping to persuade people to attend clubs or bars where alcohol must remain on site. However, the measure is a controversial one because people can still buy alcohol before the selling limit hour and consume it in public. Furthermore, the enforcement of the law is strongest in the most populated botellón areas and has caused some stores away from these enforcement areas to sell alcohol illegally after the limit hour, although they risk fines.

In some provinces, laws were passed that prohibited the consumption of alcohol in the streets, with the exception of local festivities. Violators risk a fine and minors risk additional fines for underage drinking and may be taken home by the police.

In some cities, participants of botellón have moved to less populated areas either by force from local authorities patrolling an area or by choice from participants not wanting a fine. Another measure that has been attempted by local authorities is alter the opening times of public parks to remain closed at night and not allow entrance.

== Designated botellón areas ==
Most of these measures have fallen short of the intended goals, including the prohibition of drinking in the street. Therefore, there has been a recent movement to open designated botellón areas called botellódromo ("bottle track") to contain the activity. The area is located far from residential homes, usually in distant industrial parks, and monitored by local authorities.

An early example is Alicante, a southern province, that was the first to propose the idea of botellódromo and established a 4,000 m^{2} (0.99 acres) outdoor area located on a pier in the city of Alicante. The idea was to please both residents and participants by preventing the youth from occupying other parts of the city while also providing an area for botellón. The area is surveyed by police, but the police does not interfere unless it is deemed to be absolutely necessary. The area is equipped with trash bins, lighting, and protection from the seafront.

Another example of a botellódromo is Granada, another southern province. In 2006, Granada's town hall designated an area of 9,500 m^{2} (2.3 acres) around the area of Huerta del Rasillo that is capable of hosting 20,000 people at a time. In response to botellódromo, the youth have proposed an alternative solution to the botellón issue, suggesting bars and clubs lower drink prices and entrance fees, as well as other night activities such as sporting events, cultural festivities and other activities.

== Macro-botellón ==
A macro-botellón is a large and usually pre-planned botellón.

One example of a macro-botellón was on 17 March 2006, "Half of Spain [met] on the net to organize a macro-botellón".

The macro-botellón was organized in cities around Spain, such as Madrid, Barcelona, Sevilla, Oviedo, Murcia, Vitoria, Málaga, Córdoba, Granada, and Jaén.

One of the purposes of the macro-botellón on 17 March 2006, near the Faro de Moncloa in Madrid, Spain, was to protest against the municipal restrictions on drinking alcohol in the streets. The other purpose was to surpass the 5,000 people that had met in Sevilla on 16 February 2006. The City of Madrid did not officially support the event. "Madrid's City hall will not consent to the 'Macro-botellón' planned in Moncloa".

== See also ==
- Alcohol intoxication
- Binge drinking
- Block party
- Drinking in public
- Drunk walking
- Pregaming
