= Hakuna (Catholic movement) =

Catholic movement founded in Spain

- Abbreviation: HKN
- Formation: 2013
- Type: Catholic Youth Movement
- Legal status: Association of Lay Faithful
- Headquarters: Las Rozas, Madrid, Spain
- Leader: Rev. José Pedro Manglano
- Website: https://behakuna.com/

Hakuna is a Catholic Youth Movement founded in 2013, as part of the preparations for the World Youth Day 2013 in Rio de Janeiro. Canonically, Hakuna is a private association of lay faithful, and counts with a music group called Hakuna Group Music. In actuality, the musical group is made up by more than forty musicians and singers inside the association. It has a presence in more than 20 countries.

Pope Francis describes them as a "eucharistic family, a family that knows no frontiers or languages, as its centre is God himself"

== History ==
Hakuna began in 2013 as part of the preparations for World Youth Day 2013, to be held in Rio de Janeiro. Inspired by the phrase of Pope Francis: "Make a mess, go out to the streets to live the gospel", afterwards, the priest José Pedro Manglano, began to meet with a group of young people in the parish of San José María de Aravaca, to pray holy hours, compose songs, give talks by a speaker, and to hold different types meetings.

In 2020, the directors of Opus Dei allowed their member José Pedro Manglano to lead and guide Hakuna, who until then was incardinated in the Prelature of Opus Dei.

In September 2022, Hakuna's musical group gathered 8,000 people at the Palacio Vistalegre, Madrid, to present their album Qaos. The concert went viral on social networks (such as TikTok and Instagram), primarily with the song Huracán, which had more than two million views around that time.

Since its founding, hakuna has grown exponentially, and now has a presence in almost all the province capitals in Spain, especially within Madrid, Barcelona and Valencia, alongside some cities in Europe and America.

== Organization ==
Hakuna is a private organization of lay faithful, of a foundational nature, with its own legal personality and full capacity to act, which is non-profit and has permanently affected its assets to the realization of purposes of general interest, according to its statutes. These have been approved since 2017 by the Cardinal and Archbishop of Madrid, Carlos Osoro.

Hakuna members refer to themselves as "pringados" (Spanish slang for "losers"), who are generally young people who are committed to leading a lifestyle according to Hakuna customs.

== Activities ==
Within Hakuna, these are the main activities that are organised:

- Compartiriados (Shared Activities): Shared social actions or volunteer actions.
- Revolcaderos ("Wallowing"): Groups of approximately 10 people who meet every two weeks for dinner or drinks while studying a text related to Christianity.
- Holy Hours: organized in churches. These consist of a weekly talk by the priest or a guest speaker, and then an hour of Adoration before the Blessed Sacrament.
- God Stops: retreats that take place on a weekend in outdoor silence. Some are for university students and young professionals; others are for married couples.
- Getaways: trips taken around the world to enjoy life and carry out social and faith missions.

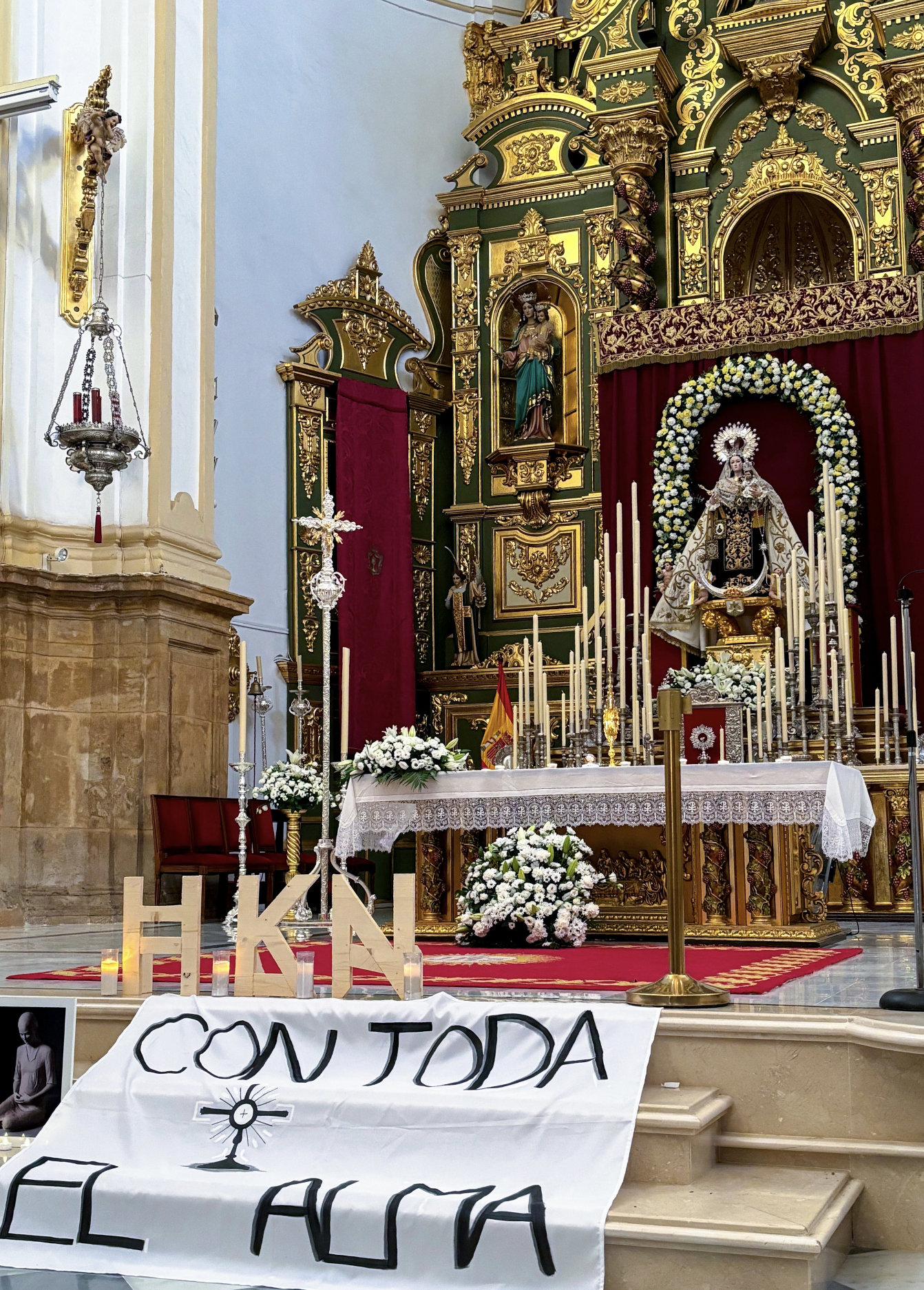
Holy hour, Hakuna.

== Albums ==
- Hakuna (2015).
- Mi pobre loco (2017).
- Pasión (2018).
- Sencillamente (2021).
- Qaos (2022).
- Capricho (2023)
- El Arte de Vivir (2025)
