= Parque del Oeste =

Public space in Madrid

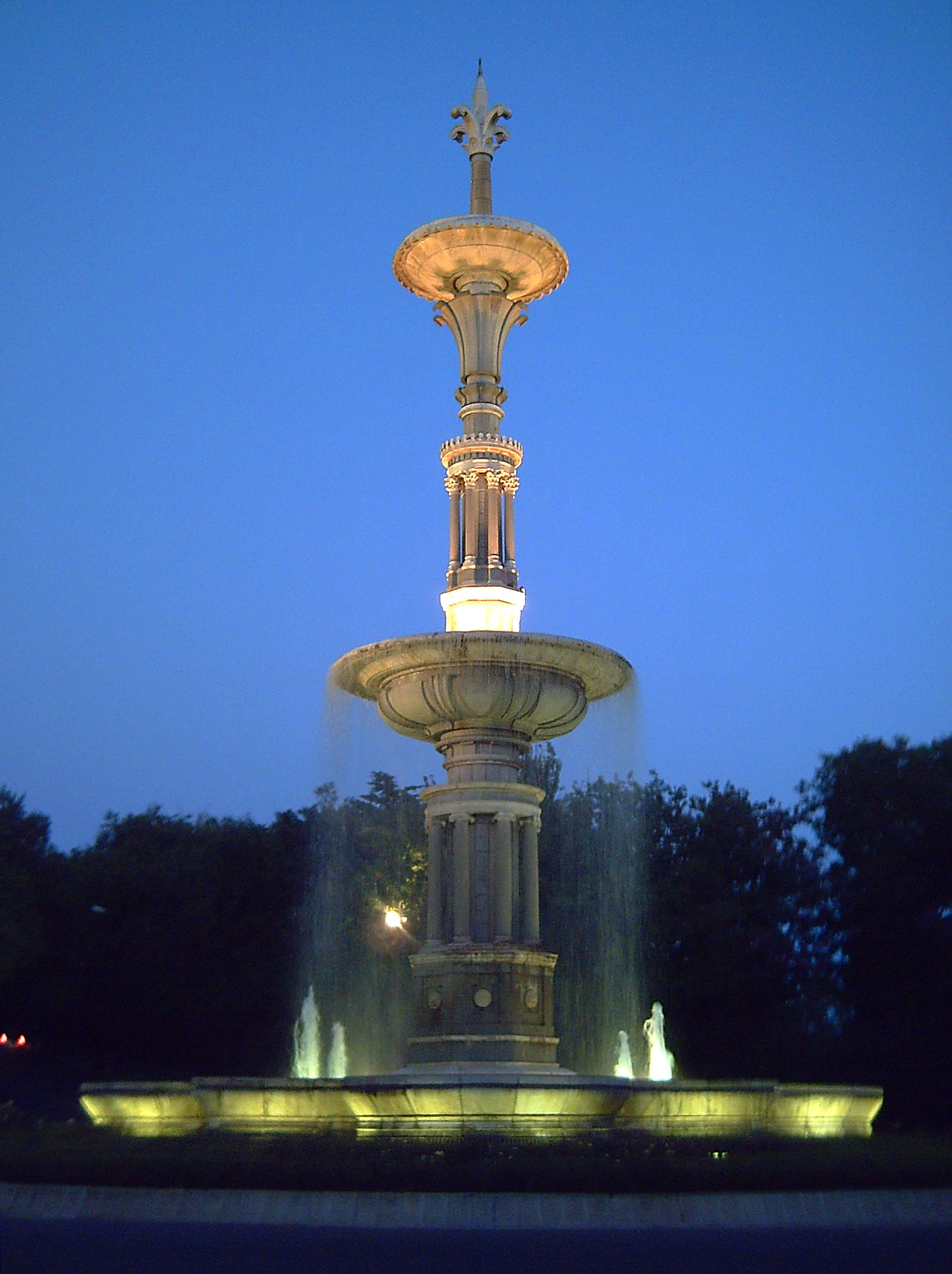
- Fountain of Juan de Villanueva.

- Location within Madrid Location within Spain
- Location: between the Autovía A-6, the Ciudad Universitaria de Madrid and the district of Moncloa, Madrid
- Coordinates: 40°25′42″N 3°43′27″W
- Created: 1893
- Status: Opened all year

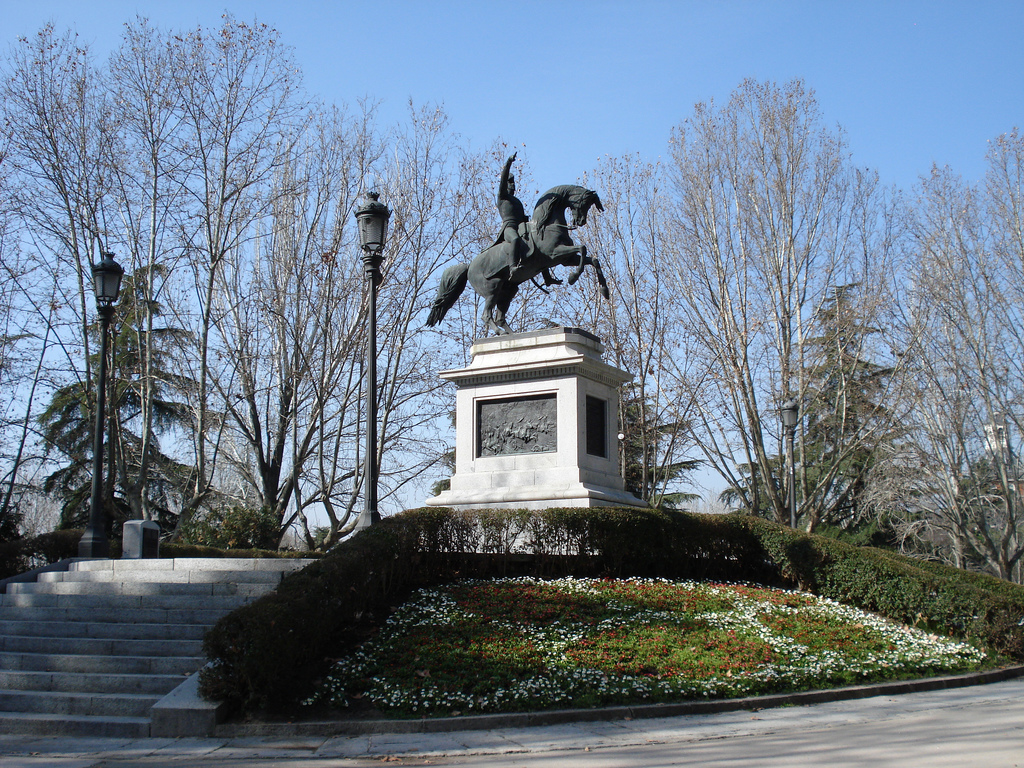
Monument of José de San Martín, by French sculptor Louis-Joseph Daumas.

The Parque del Oeste (in English: Western Park) is a park of the city of Madrid (Spain) situated between the Autovía A-6, the Ciudad Universitaria de Madrid and the district of Moncloa. Before the 20th century, the land that the park currently occupies was the main landfill of the city. The park is the initiative of Alberto Aguilera, the mayor of the city at the beginning of the 20th century, who in 1906 requested the layout of a place for walking and relaxation by landscape artist Celedonio Rodrígáñez. It has beautiful sites such as the rose garden, where a rose competition is held every year.

One of the monuments in the park is the Temple of Debod, an Ancient Egyptian temple. The Egyptian state donated the temple of Debod to Spain in 1968 as a sign of gratitude for the help provided by Spain in saving the Abu Simbel temples.

The Parque del Oeste is linked to the Casa de Campo by the Teleférico de Madrid, a gondola lift.

== History ==
Work began in 1893 and the first phase was inaugurated in 1905. This phase included an approximate area of 87 hectares between the present streets of Moret, and Seneca, plus a car ride today Paseo de Camoes.

In 1906, work continued work on the second phase, reaching the Cuartel de la Montaña (the current location of the Temple of Debod). It extended parallel to the Paseo del Pintor Rosales on old dumps.

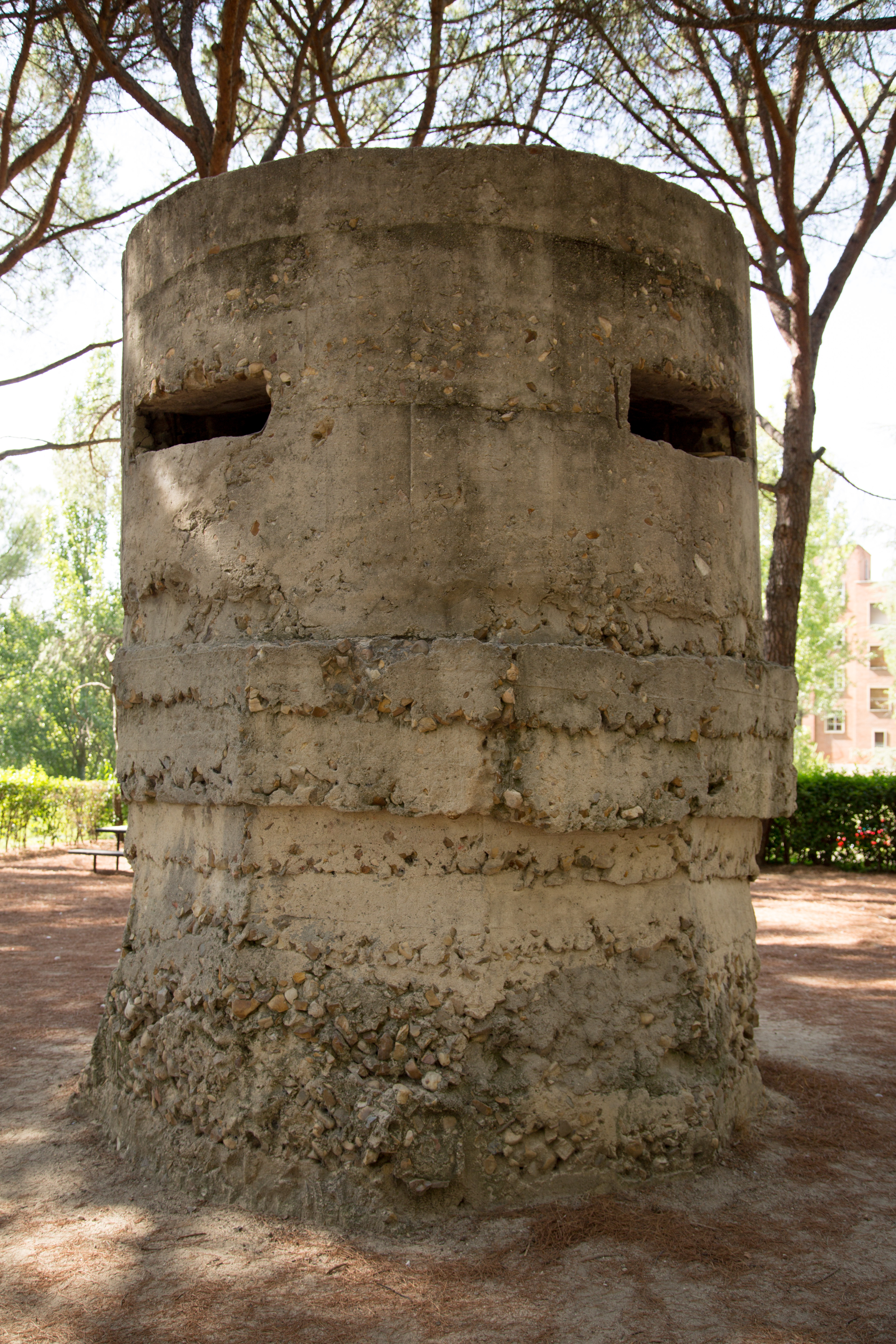
Bunker from the Battle of Ciudad Universitaria still standing in 2016 in the northern end of the park

During the Civil War, Parque de Oeste became the battlefield of the Battle of Ciudad Universitaria, opening trenches and building bunkers that still can be seen at its northern end. The southern end of the park was the site of the siege of the Montaña barracks, (now demolished) in July 1936.

Once the war ended, D. Cecilio Rodriguez, responsible for municipal parks, was responsible for its reconstruction, which lasted until the late 1940s. The landscape character, the type of planting and layout of the roads were respected.

During the years 1956 and 1973, it has been extended, occupying the lands of Cuartel de la Montaña, building the Rose Garden and the Parque de la montaña, located in the Temple of Debod.
