= Valdemarín =

Coordinates: 40°28′21.22″N 3°46′48.86″W

- Ward of Madrid
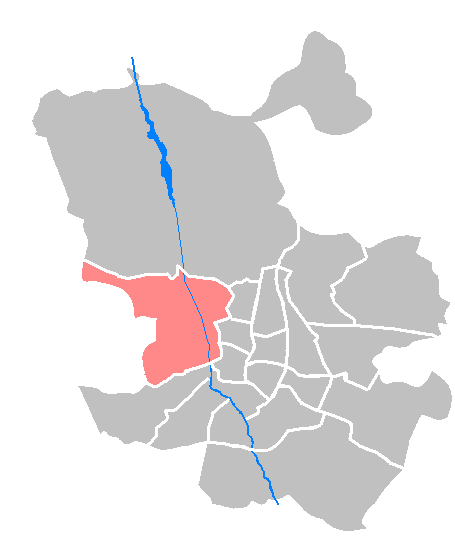
- Moncloa-Aravaca district within Madrid. Valdemarín is in the north-western borders.
- Country: Spain
- Aut. community: Madrid
- Municipality: Madrid
- District: Moncloa-Aravaca

Population
  - Total: 4,000

Valdemarín is a ward (barrio) of Madrid belonging to the district of Moncloa-Aravaca. Its code number is 95 and, as of 2006, its population was 4,000.

== Geography ==
The ward is located in the north-western area of the city, crossed by the M-40 orbital motorway and close to the borders of Moncloa-Aravaca with Fuencarral-El Pardo. The nearest barrios are Aravaca in the south, and Ciudad Universitaria in the east. Just in the north of Valdemarín, over the M-40, is situated a great city forest (16,000 ha) named Monte de El Pardo.

The principal road of the ward is Avenida de Valdemarín, running from east to west.
