= El Plantío =

Coordinates: 40°28′14.88″N 3°49′32.02″W

- Ward of Madrid
- Country: Spain
- Aut. community: Madrid
- Municipality: Madrid
- District: Moncloa-Aravaca

El Plantío is a ward (barrio) of Madrid belonging to the district of Moncloa-Aravaca.

The Colegio Japonés de Madrid, a Japanese international school, is in El Plantío.
