= Aravaca =

Neighborhood in Madrid, Spain

Coordinates: 40°27′N 3°47′W

- City neighborhood
- Parish of the Assumption of Our Lady, Aravaca

- Location of the Aravaca neighborhood in the Moncloa-Aravaca district, Madrid
- Interactive map of Aravaca
- Country: Spain
- Region: Community of Madrid
- Municipality: Madrid
- District: Moncloa-Aravaca

Aravaca is a ward (Barrio) of the city of Madrid, in Moncloa-Aravaca district. It is 9 kilometres (5.6 mi) from the city centre, on the other side of Casa de Campo park. The population of the barrio is 29,547 (January 2006), divided into three areas: Aravaca (23,145), Valdemarín (4,000) and El Plantío (2,469)

== History ==
During the Spanish Civil War, Aravaca was on the front line for three years in the Siege of Madrid (1936-39). One may still find military bunkers used by Franco's attacking troops in the parks and woods. The old town was completely devastated and was rebuilt in the forties. Dating from this years are the parish church and some houses in Baja de la Iglesia street, all designed in the old Castilian style.

Until 1951, Aravaca was an independent city within Madrid province with its own town hall and mayor. During the long Spanish postwar period (1940-1959), millions of Spaniards left their homes in the poor provinces to migrate to industrial areas such as Madrid, Barcelona, Valencia and the Basque Country. Aravaca grew quickly between 1950 and 1980 and became a middle-class residential suburb.

From 1990, thanks to new urban plans, the population of Aravaca has doubled and the streets are now connected with the neighbouring town of Pozuelo de Alarcón. The population today is about 30,000 people, mainly commuters who work in Madrid and in the metropolitan area. The public transport network is efficient with buses every 10 minutes to the centre, a railway station and a Metro line.
