= Argüelles (Madrid) =

Coordinates: 40°25′40″N 3°43′4″W

- City neighborhood
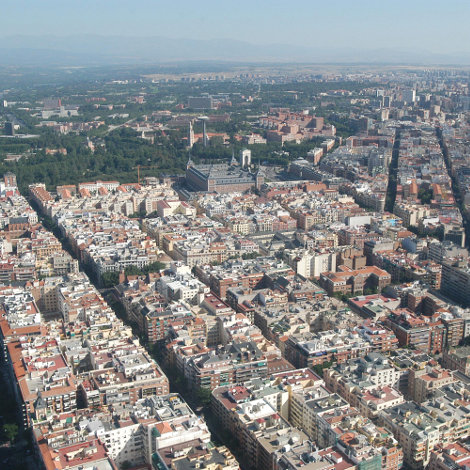
- Interactive map of Argüelles
- Country: Spain
- Region: Community of Madrid
- Municipality: Madrid
- District: Moncloa-Aravaca

Argüelles is an administrative neighborhood (barrio) of Madrid belonging to the district of Moncloa-Aravaca. As of 1 July 2019, it had a population of 24,257 inhabitants. It is 0,755758 km^{2} in total area. The Cerralbo Museum is located in the neighborhood.

== History ==
The neighborhood bears the name of Agustín Argüelles, the legal guardian of Queen Isabella II. The first streets were chiefly named after influential members of the Royal Court. Planned in the mid 19th century, its urbanization started by 1856, on plots part of the Príncipe Pío hill.

== Bibliography ==
- Bravo Navarro, Martín (2009). El Barrio de Argüelles de Madrid y las primeras residencias universitarias del Opus Dei. Madrid. Archived from the original on 2019-08-12.
- Díez de Baldeón García, Alicia (1993). "El nacimiento de un barrio burgués: Argüelles en el siglo XIX" (PDF). Norba: Revista de Arte (13): 231–268. ISSN 0213-2214.
- Gómez Iglesias, Agustín (1968). "La montaña del Príncipe Pío y sus alrededores (1565-1907)" (PDF). Villa de Madrid (25): 11–29. ISSN 0042-6164.
