= Teleférico de Madrid =

Gondola lift in Madrid, Spain

Coordinates: 40.423896°N 3.735350°W

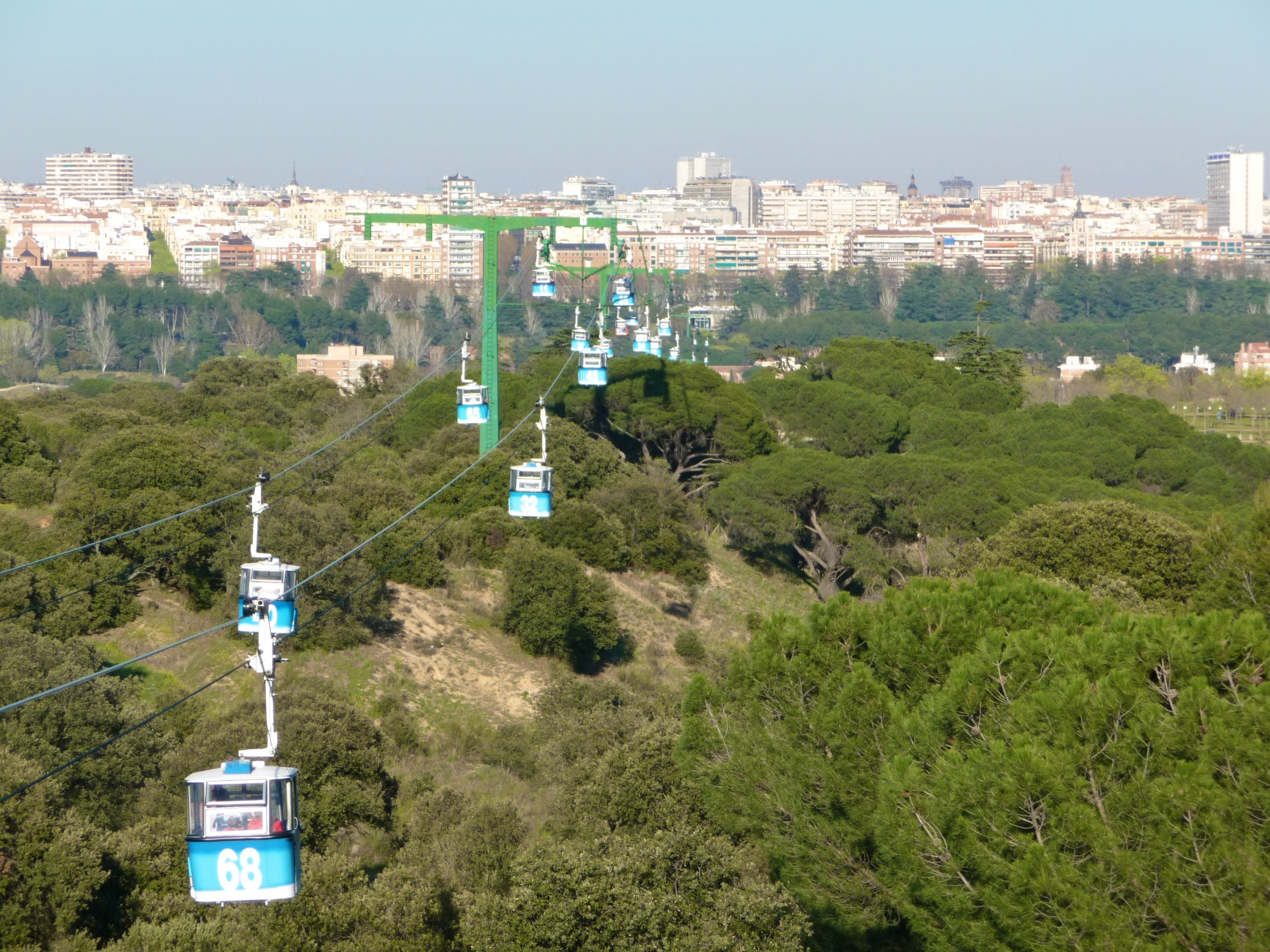
- The gondola lift with the city behind
- Interactive map of Teleférico de Madrid

Overview
- Status: Closed
- Character: Gondola lift
- Location: Madrid, Spain
- Termini: Parque del Oeste; Casa de Campo
- No. of stations: 2
- Open: 1969

Technical features
- Aerial lift type: Bi-cable gondola detachable
- Manufactured by: Von Roll
- Line length: 2,457 m (8,061 ft)

The Teleférico de Madrid, or Madrid Cable Car, is a gondola lift in the Spanish capital city of Madrid. It is 2,457 metres (8,061 ft) long and links the Parque del Oeste with the Casa de Campo. The line was built by Von Roll and opened in 1969. It uses 72 six-seater cabins, which take 11 minutes to travel the full length of the line.

The lift was closed in 2022 after the discovery of structural damage, and is currently awaiting fundamental repairs.
