= Hospital Clínico San Carlos =

Coordinates: 40.44076°N 3.72007°W

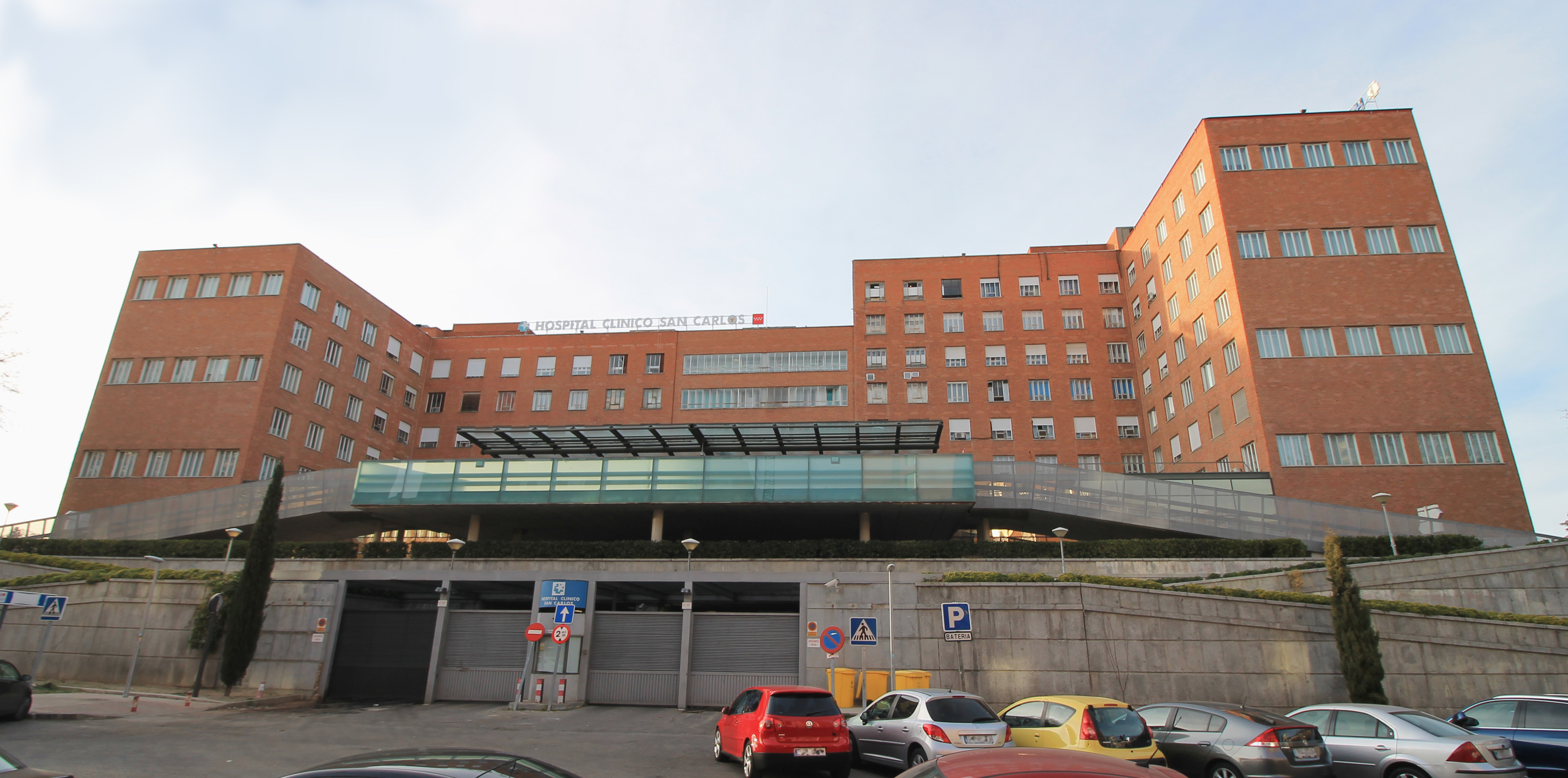

Geography
- Location: Calle del Profesor Martín Lagos, 2, 28040, Madrid, Community of Madrid, Spain

Organisation
- Funding: Public hospital
- Type: Teaching, District General
- Affiliated university: Complutense University of Madrid
- Network: Servicio Madrileño de Salud

Services
- Beds: 861

History
- Opened: 20 January 1951

Links
- Lists: Hospitals in Spain

The Hospital Clínico San Carlos is a hospital located at the Ciudad Universitaria neighborhood in Madrid, Spain, part of hospital network of the Servicio Madrileño de Salud (SERMAS).

It is one of the healthcare institutions associated to the Complutense University of Madrid (UCM) for the purpose of clinical internship.

== History ==
It is the successor of the namesake Hospital de San Carlos located near the calle de Atocha and inaugurated on 1 October 1787. The idea for the new building dates back to 1927, during the dictatorship of Primo de Rivera. Following a project by Manuel Sánchez Arcas (with Eduardo Torroja as structural engineer), the building works started in 1932, during the Second Republic. The project stood out by the beamless slabs of the cantilevered balconies and by the cover of the operating rooms (both elements unseen in Spain up to that date). The hospital was still unfinished by the time of the beginning of the Spanish Civil War, when the Ciudad Universitaria became part of the frontline. Reconstruction works were resumed in 1941. Despite the hospital started operations on 20 January 1951, as the chair of General Pathology was transferred then from Atocha, building works lasted until 1967, when the last services provided at the old hospital were finally transferred to the new building.

As of 2019 it has 861 beds.
