= Zoo Aquarium de Madrid =

- Interactive map of Zoo Aquarium de Madrid
- 40°24′31″N 3°45′45″W
- Date opened: 1972
- Location: Madrid, Spain
- Land area: over 20 hectares
- No. of animals: 6000
- No. of species: 500
- Memberships: EAZA, WAZA
- Owner: Parques Reunidos
- Website: www.zoomadrid.com

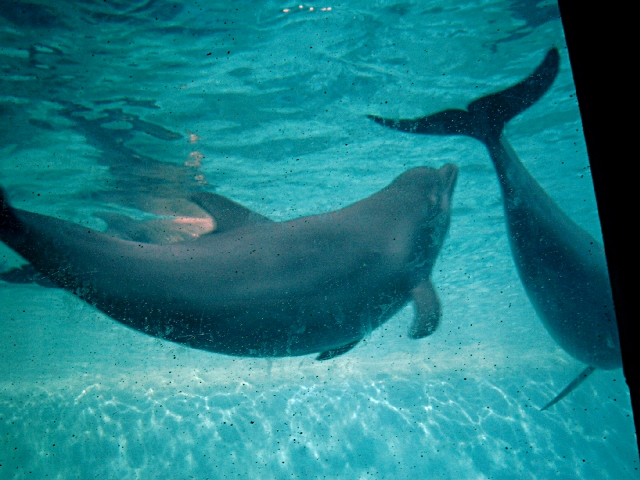
Dolphins in the Zoo Aquarium

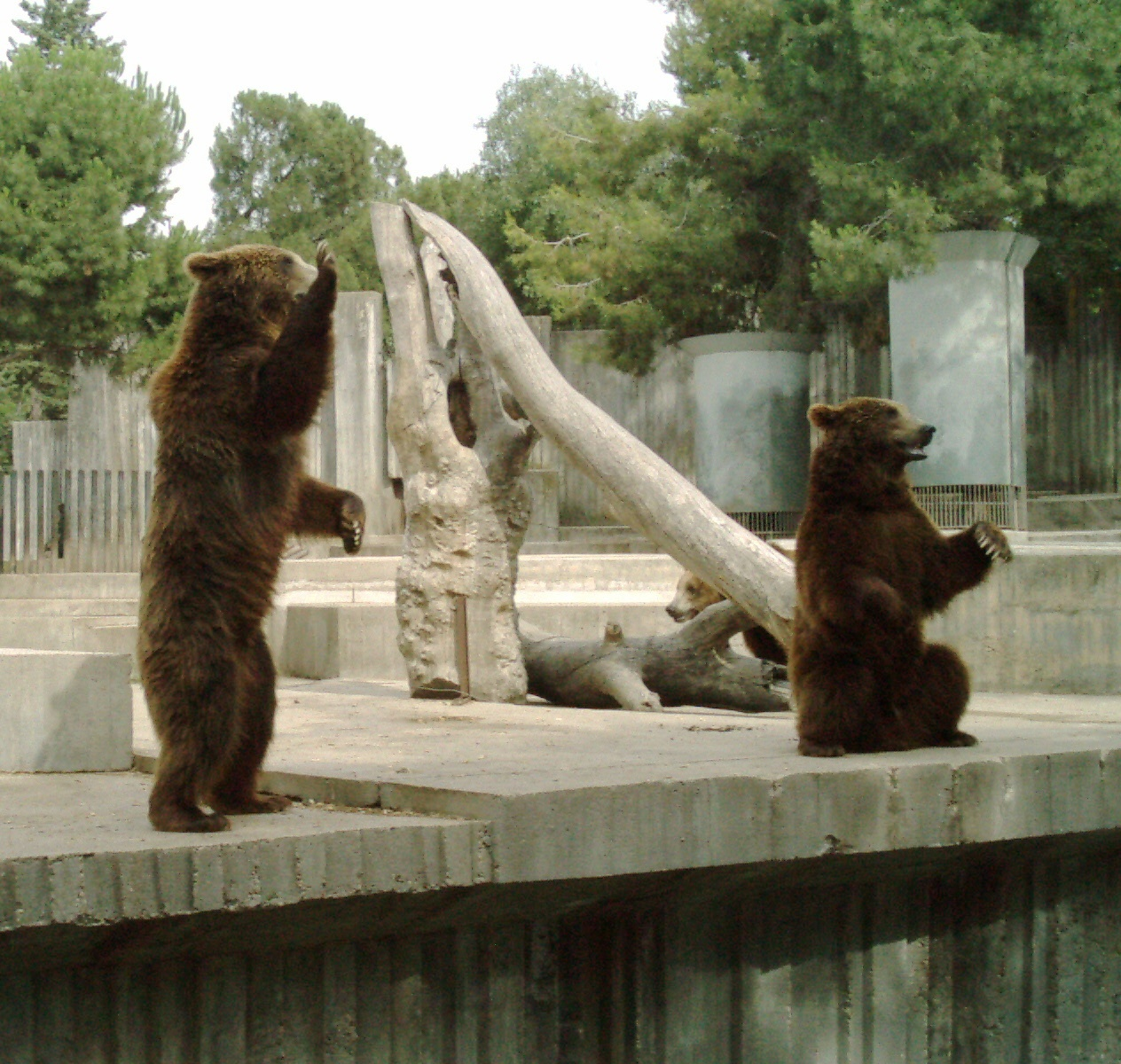
Brown bear cubs in the Madrid Zoo Aquarium

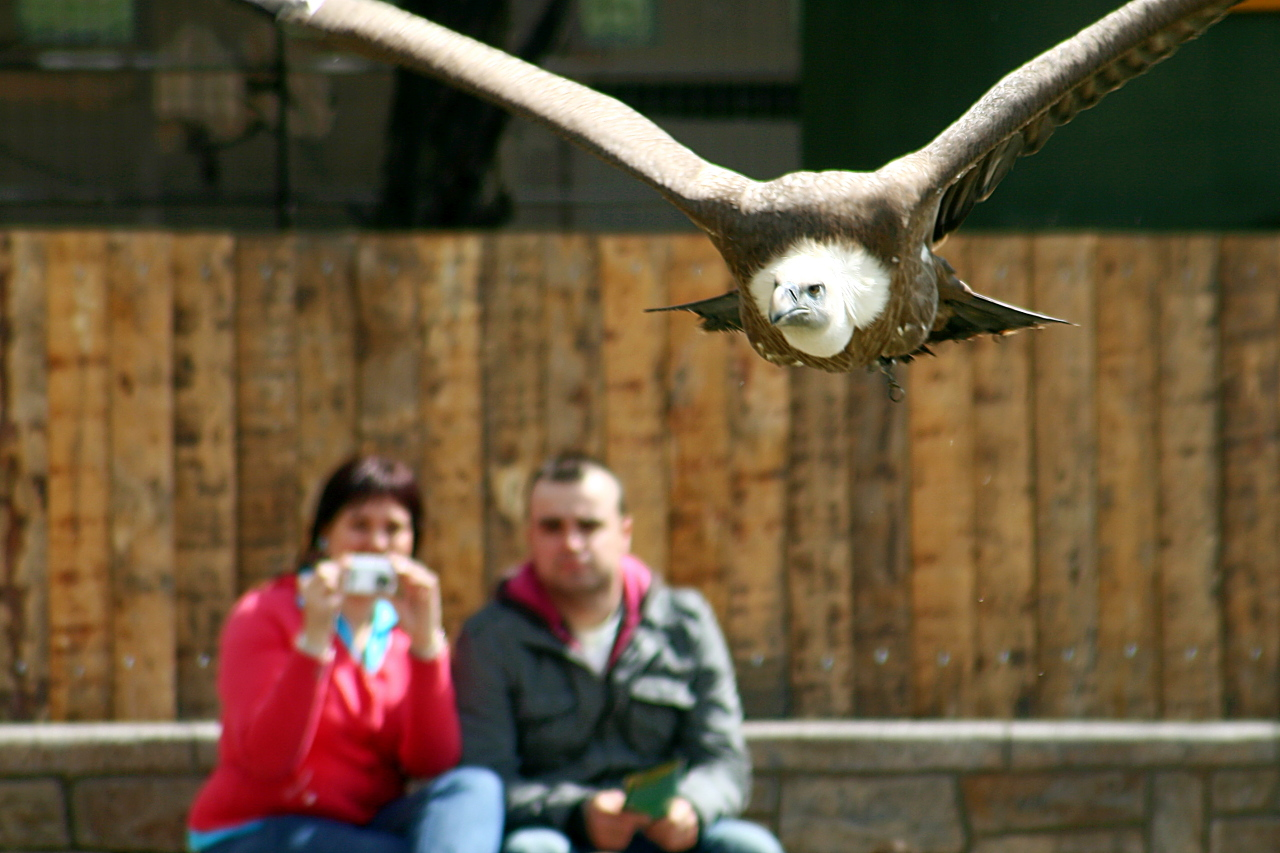
Eagles over the people in Madrid Zoo Aquarium

The Madrid Zoo Aquarium is a 20-hectare (49-acre) zoo and aquarium located in the Casa de Campo in Madrid, Spain. The zoo is owned by the city, but is managed by the international entertainment operator Parques Reunidos. Opened in 1972, it is one of the largest zoos in Spain and one of the few zoos in the world that houses giant pandas.

The zoo is a member of the European Association of Zoos and Aquaria (EAZA) and the World Association of Zoos and Aquariums (WAZA).

== History ==
The first zoo in Madrid was opened in 1770 as the "Casa de Fieras" in Retiro Park, to exhibit animals from the American and Asian provinces, on grounds which still are part of Parque del Buen Retiro. The new facilities of the Madrid Zoo Aquarium were constructed in 1972 and located in the Casa de Campo.

== Facilities ==
Its exhibits include the zoo, a petting zoo, an aquarium with 2,000,000 L (530,000 US gal) of salt water, a dolphin exhibit, and an aviary. Facilities include several restaurants, a boat tour, and train tour.

== Animals ==
It is home to over 6,000 animals of 500 different species.

=== Pandas ===
In 1978, China presented the King of Spain with two giant pandas, Shao Shao and Quian Quiang. Their cub, Chu-lin, born in 1982, died in 1996. Chu-lin was the first panda born in captivity using artificial insemination in Europe.

The zoo is now home to giant pandas Bing Xing (M) and Hua Zui Ba (F), who arrived in Madrid on 8 September 2007. Twin cubs, Po and De De, were born to them on 7 September 2010. They were conceived via artificial insemination.

=== Koalas ===
There is a small group of koalas living in the zoo. These animals are kept in a controlled temperature space and are fed with Eucalyptus leaves brought from Huelva.

=== Primates ===
The zoo has a large collection of primates, including western lowland gorillas, chimpanzees, mandrills, mantled guerezas, orangutans and several species of lemurs.

=== Dolphinarium ===
The dolphinarium at Zoo Aquarium was built in 1987 and currently has nine bottlenose dolphins: Lala (F), Einyel (F), Guarina (F), Mary (F), Mancha (F), Loren (M), Noa (F), Iruka (F) and Coral (F).
