= Moncloa-Aravaca =

Coordinates: 40.435151°N 3.718765°W

- District
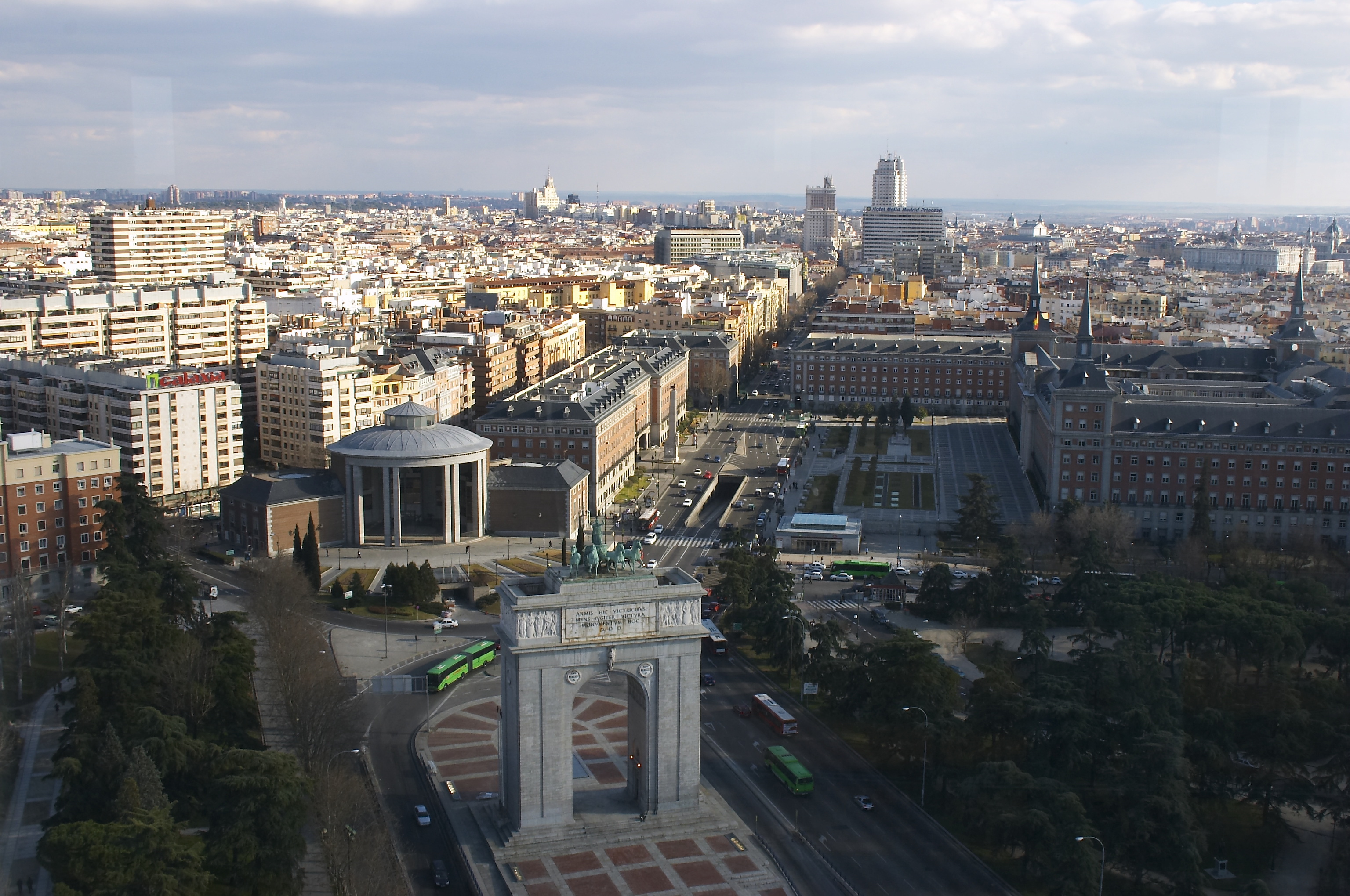
- Plaza de Moncloa
- Interactive map of Moncloa-Aravaca
- Country: Spain
- Aut. community: Community of Madrid
- Municipality: Madrid

Government
  - Councillor-President: Borja Fanjul (PP, 2023)

Area
  - Total: 32.89 km^{2} (12.70 sq mi)

Population
  - Total: 116.531
- Postal codes: 28008, 28015, 28023, 28035, 28039, 28040

Moncloa-Aravaca (Spanish pronunciation: [moŋˈklo.a aɾaˈβaka]) is a district of the municipality of Madrid, Spain. It is located to the northwest of the city centre, spanning across both banks of the Manzanares. It is made up of the neighborhoods of Aravaca, Argüelles, Casa de Campo, Ciudad Universitaria, El Plantío, Valdemarín and Valdezarza.

The Palace of Moncloa, located in Ciudad Universitaria, is the residence of the Spanish Prime Minister.

== Subdivision ==
The district is administratively divided into 7 neighborhoods (barrios):

- Aravaca
- Argüelles
- Casa de Campo
- Ciudad Universitaria
- El Plantío
- Valdemarín
- Valdezarza

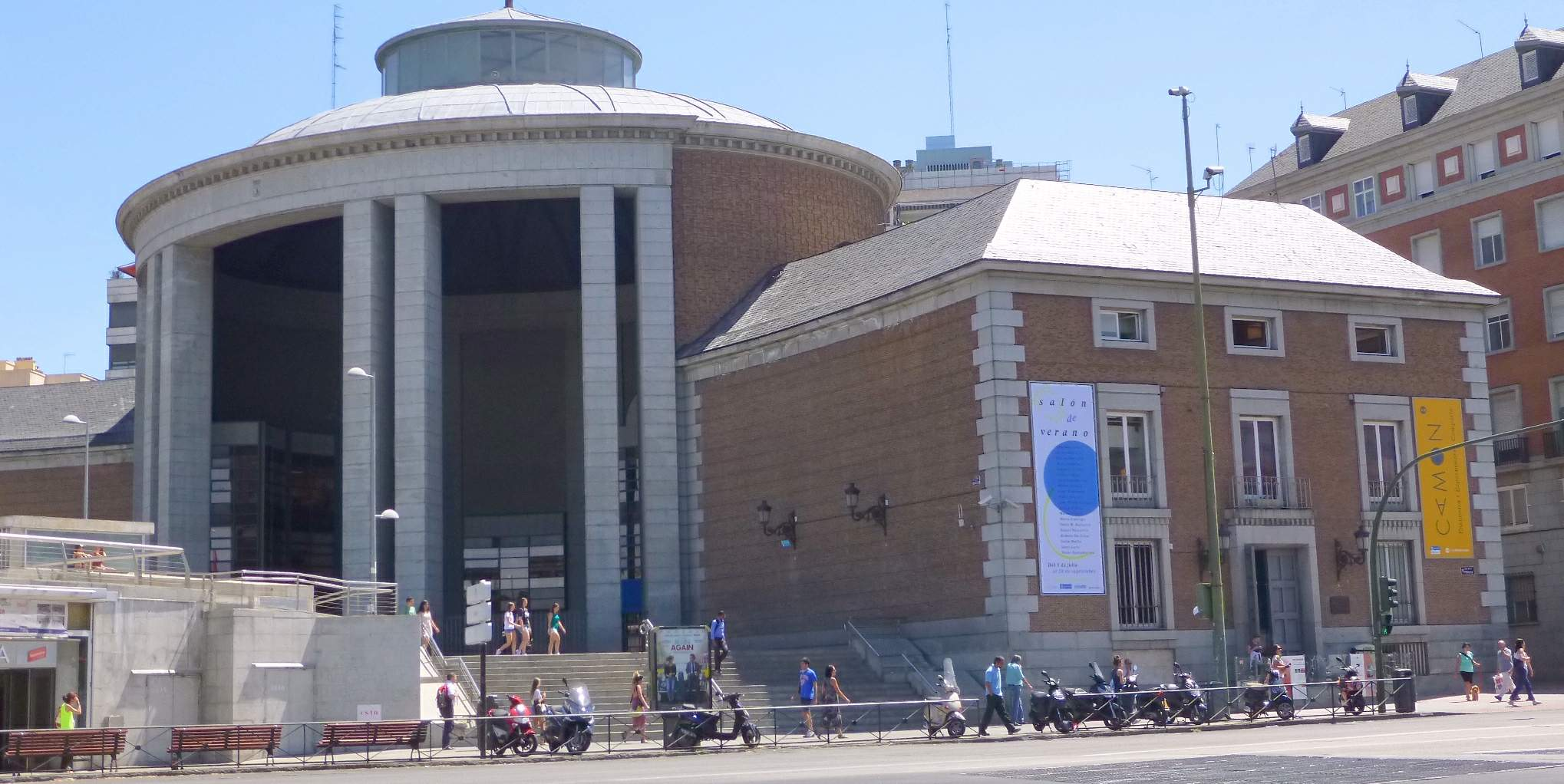
Municipal building of the Moncloa-Aravaca district

== Landmarks ==
- Museo Cerralbo
- Museo de América
- Zoo Aquarium de Madrid
- Parque de Atracciones de Madrid
- Faro de Moncloa:
- Arco de la Victoria: A triumphal arch built between 1950–56
- Puente de los Franceses
- Colegio Japonés de Madrid, the Japanese international school in Madrid, is located in the El Plantío area.
