= Faro de Moncloa =

Transmission tower in Madrid, Spain

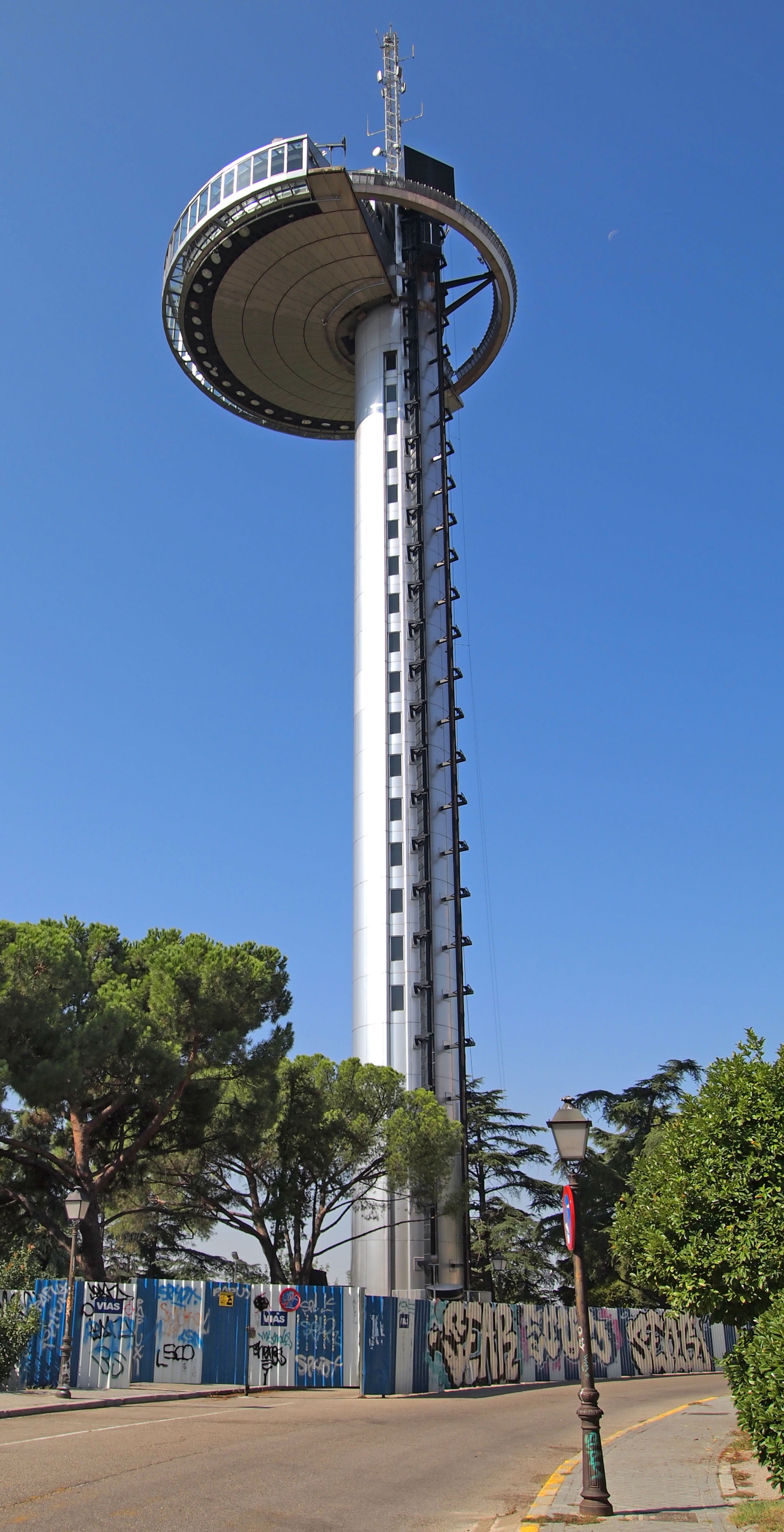
- Faro de Moncloa
- Interactive map of Faro de Moncloa
- Alternative names: Moncloa Tower

General information
- Type: transmitter/observation deck
- Location: Plaza de Moncloa, Madrid, Spain
- Coordinates: 40°26′15″N 3°43′18″W
- Completed: 1992

Height
- Height: 110 m (360 ft 10 1/2 in)
- Observatory: 92 m (301 ft 10 in)

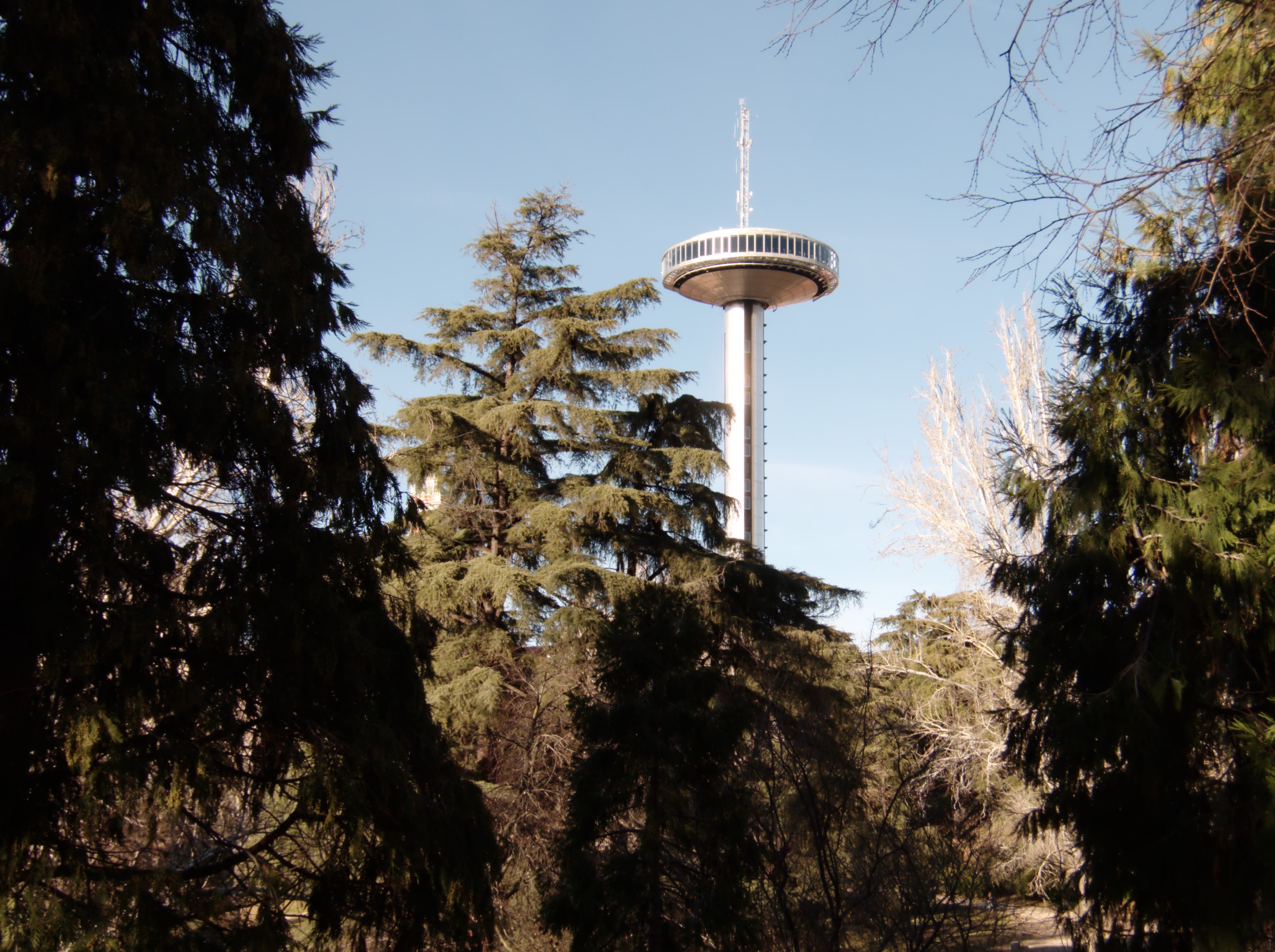
View of Faro de Moncloa from the ground

The Faro de Moncloa is a 110-metre (360 ft)-high transmission tower with an observation deck at the Plaza De Moncloa, Madrid, Spain. It was designed by architect Salvador Pérez Arroyo and was built in 1992 to commemorate Madrid's naming as a European Capital of Culture. The tower was closed to the public from 2005 to 2015, when new safety regulations were introduced after the Windsor Tower fire took place earlier that year. It reopened to the public in April 2015.

== See also ==
- Moncloa-Aravaca
- List of towers
