= Ciudad Universitaria (Madrid) =

- City neighborhood
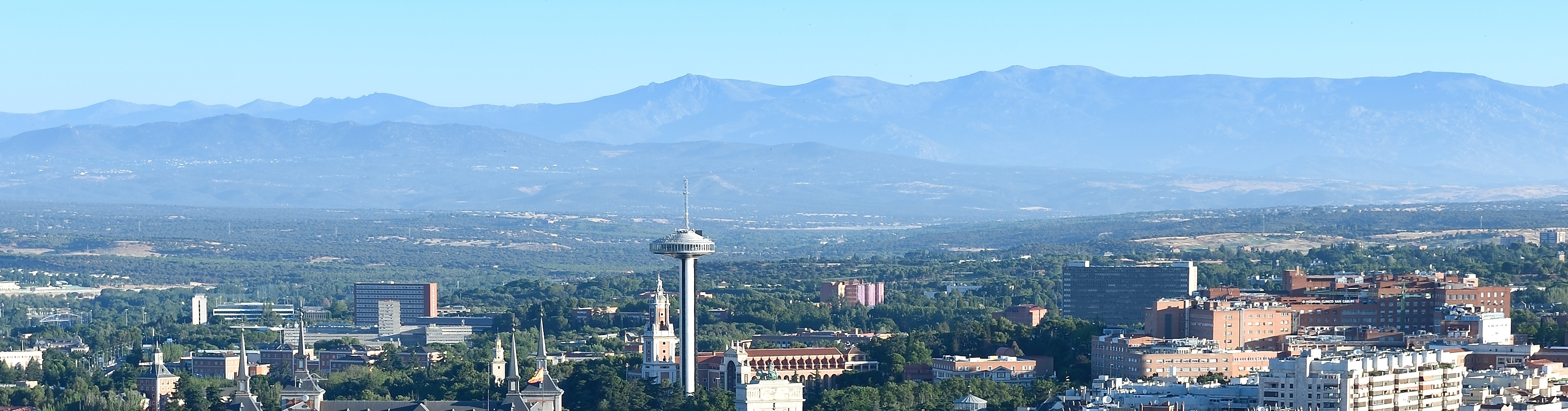
- Interactive map of Ciudad Universitaria
- Country: Spain
- Region: Community of Madrid
- Municipality: Madrid
- District: Moncloa-Aravaca

Ciudad Universitaria is an administrative neighborhood (barrio) of Madrid belonging to the district of Moncloa-Aravaca. It is served by Ciudad Universitaria (Madrid Metro).

It contains and is named after the University City of Madrid (Ciudad Universitaria de Madrid), a complex that is home to several universities and various research organizations, including:

- Universidad Complutense de Madrid
- Universidad Politécnica de Madrid
- Universidad Nacional de Educación a Distancia
- Universidad Antonio de Nebrija
- Universidad Pontificia de Salamanca
- CUNEF (Colegio Universitario de Estudios Financieros)
