= Casa de Campo =

Largest public park in Madrid, Spain

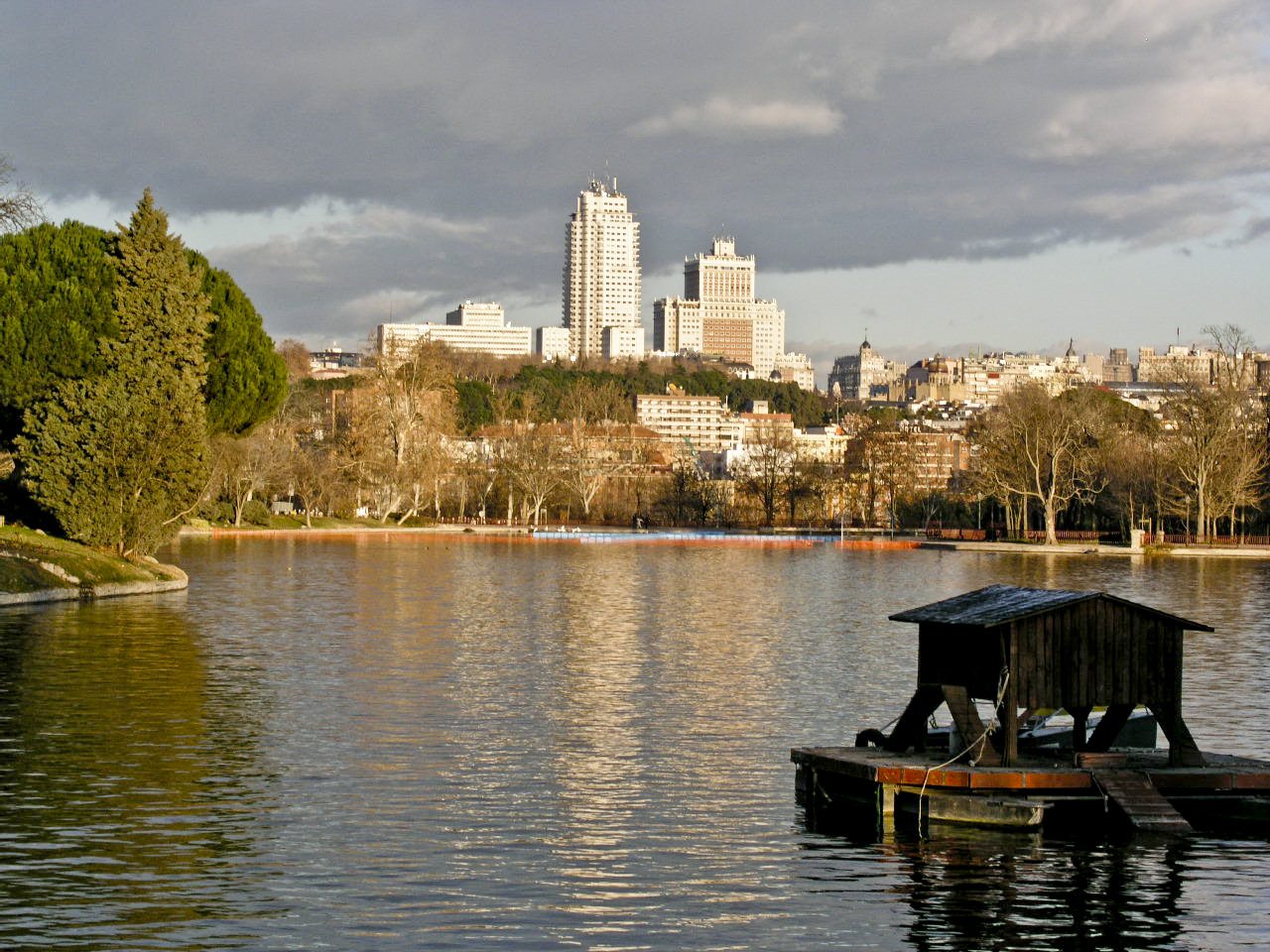
- Lake in Casa de Campo
- Interactive map of Casa de Campo
- Type: Public park
- Location: Madrid, Spain
- Coordinates: 40.42291°N 3.75595°W
- Area: 17.23 square kilometres (4,260 acres)
- Created: 1 May 1931

Spanish Cultural Heritage
- Type: Non-movable
- Criteria: Historic Garden
- Designated: 3 June 1931
- Reference no.: RI-52-0000004

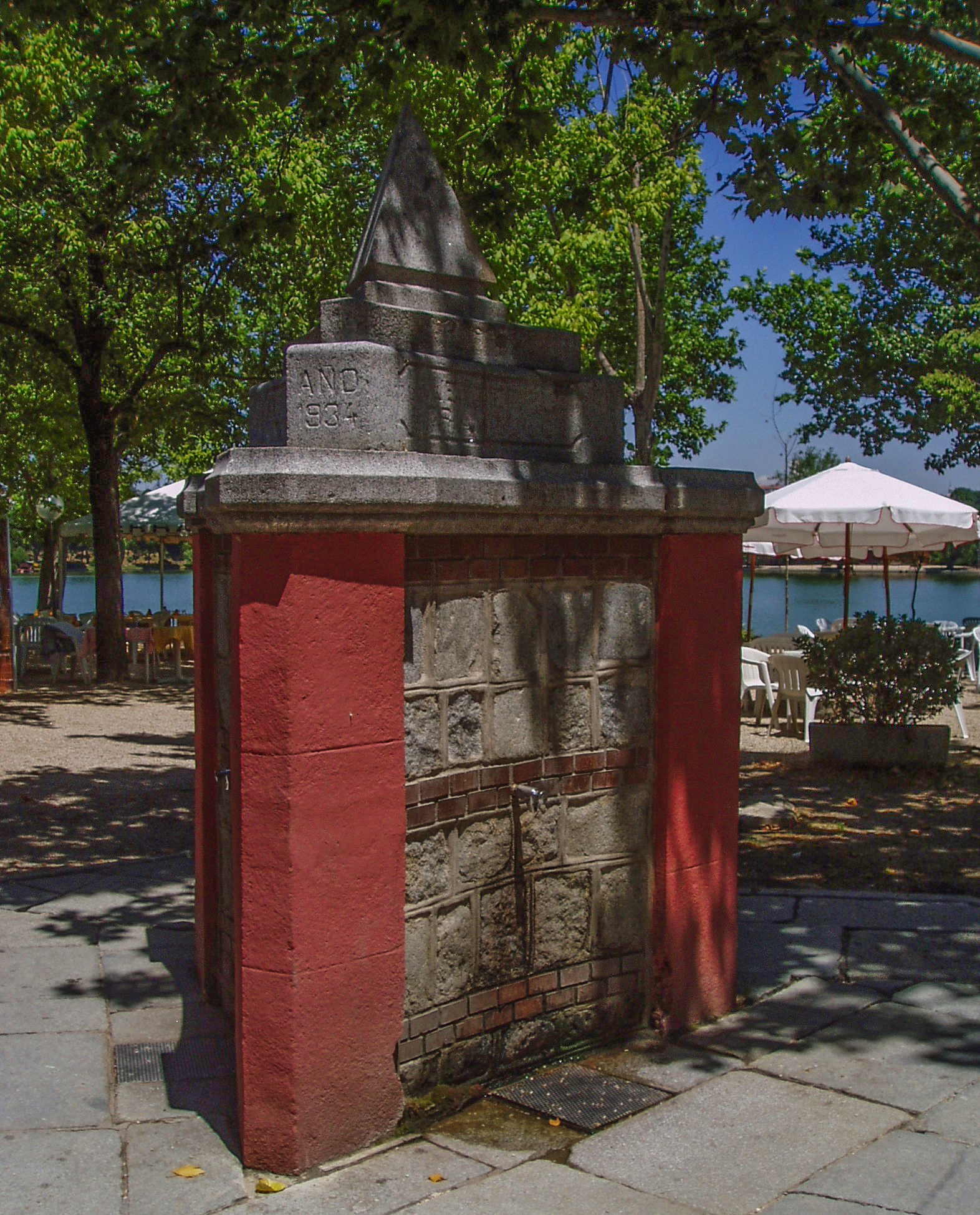
Fountain of the Triangle in Casa de Campo.

The Casa de Campo (Spanish pronunciation: [ˈkasa ðe ˈkampo], for Spanish: Country House) is the largest public park in Madrid. It is situated west of central Madrid, Spain. It gets its name 'Country House' because it was once a royal hunting estate, located just west of the Royal Palace of Madrid. It was created in the early 16th century for use by the royal family and nobility, and was opened to the public in 1931 when it became a public park. Today, it is a popular green space and weekend destination for Madrid residents.

Its area is 1,722.6 hectares (4,257 acres), about five times the size of New York City's Central Park or twice the size of Paris' Bois de Boulogne. The Casa de Campo is linked to the Parque del Oeste by the Teleférico de Madrid, a gondola lift.

The complex was declared in 2010 an Asset of Cultural Interest by the Community of Madrid. Per the regulations of the General Urban Planning Plan of the Madrid City Council of 1997, it's classified as a historic park.

== Overview ==
View of the park from the cable-car

An amusement park, the Parque de Atracciones de Madrid, and the Madrid Zoo are located inside the park. The park also contains an artificial lake for recreation.

From 1936 to 1939, during the Spanish Civil War, the front lines of the Siege of Madrid ran through the Casa de Campo, where the Republicans had halted a nationalist offensive in November 1936.

In the 1990s and 2000s, the park was a center of prostitution.

== Flora and fauna ==
The natural vegetation of Casa de Campo is mainly holm oak forest, accompanied by mediterranean bushes. However, throughout its history it has undergone constant transformation, even being used as farmland in some periods and repopulated in others with different non-native tree species, mainly stone pines or cypress trees, but also others such as poplars, chestnut trees, plane trees, ash trees, oaks or willows. In 2002, 686,294 specimens (trees or shrubs) were registered in the woodland inventory of the park.

In 2000, 18 trees or groups of them were classified as Singular Trees. They are marked with wooden signs that describe their special characteristics. A 2021 winter storm, Filomena, destroyed at least a tenth of the trees throughout Madrid, and damaged an unknown amount of the park.

== Access ==
The park can be accessed via the Teleferico, a gondola with a pick up point inside the Parque del Oeste on the west end of Madrid. The drop-off point houses a restaurant with an overlook of Madrid, playgrounds (both inside and outside), and access to Casa de Campo's many trails. The park is connected to Madrid's public transit system, including stations on lines 5 and 10 of the Madrid Metro.

== See also ==
- Madrid Arena
- Madrid Zoo
- Parque de Atracciones de Madrid
