= Vaamonde =

Vaamonde is a Spanish surname. Notable people with the surname include:

- José Lino Vaamonde (1900–1986), Spanish architect
- Lucía Vaamonde (born 1949), Venezuelan hurdler
