= Modesto López Otero =

Spanish architect

- Born: 24 February 1885; Valladolid, Spain
- Died: 23 December 1962 (aged 77); Madrid, Spain
- Occupation: Architect

Modesto López Otero (24 February 1883 – 23 December 1962) was a Spanish architect. He taught for many years in the Superior Technical School of Architecture of Madrid. He directed construction of the Madrid University City, much of which was damaged during the Spanish Civil War (1936–39). He designed many houses, office buildings, monuments and churches. The Arco de la Victoria (1956) celebrates the victory of the Nationalist forces led by General Francisco Franco over the Republicans.

== Life ==
Modesto López Otero was born in Valladolid on 24 February 1885. His parents were Juan López Nuñez, from Coreos, Valladolid and Amalia Otero from El Saler, Lugo. He attended the Institute of Education of the Piarists of Valladolid for his secondary education, then took a preparatory course for Agricultural Engineers in Madrid and entered the School of Architecture in 1902. In 1910 he submitted a plan for a proposed concert hall for orchestra and choral performances for his final examination, and passed with high marks. He began to practice architecture with his fellow-student José Yárnoz Larrosa. He won a prize at the first Salón de Arquitectura of the Society of Friends of Art. He and Yárnoz Larrosa won a gold medal at the National Exposition of 1912, and also won the first prize for the Monument of the Cortes de Cádiz. That year López Otero won the Hans Peschl Scholarship granted each year by the Royal Academy of Fine Arts to outstanding students so they could study in Vienna.

López Otero was always interested in teaching, and in 1916 was appointed professor of Projects at the Superior Technical School of Architecture of Madrid. In 1923 López Oter was named a member of the Real Academia de Bellas Artes de San Femando. His inaugural speech at the Royal Academy was on The Spanish influence on American architecture, mainly dealing architecture of 16th century missions. At the Royal Academy he was always active in defense of the Spanish artistic heritage.

Also in 1923 López Otero was chosen to direct the Madrid University City (Ciudad Universitaria de Madrid) project. He formed a diverse team of young architects to design the various buildings for the Madrid University City. After studying several famous universities in Europe, López Otero led a team to North America in November 1927 where they visited Yale, Harvard, M.I.T. and universities in Montreal, Toronto, Michigan, Rochester, Washington, Baltimore, Princeton, and New York City. The University City was planned in 1927–28. A final ideal perspective was created in December 1928. The campus covered 320 hectares (790 acres) on a site in the western margin of Madrid, on a plan that drew much from American models. The building designs were influenced by European avant-garde architecture of the period, and the overall layout kept the campus closely integrated with the city of Madrid. Construction began in 1929. Construction continued after the Second Spanish Republic was initiated in 1931, but halted with the outbreak of the Spanish Civil War (1936–39). Most of the buildings were partially destroyed by bombs during the Civil War.

In 1932 López Oter was appointed to the Academy of History, where he lectured on modern technology in the conservation of buildings. As an architect he designed a wide variety of buildings, including private homes, vacation homes, office buildings, monuments and churches. In 1934 Manuel Sánchez Arcas and the engineer Eduardo Torroja founded the Instituto Técnico de la Construcción y Edificación (ITCE, Technical Institute of Construction and Building). Other founding members were López Otero and the engineers José María Aguirre Gonzalo (1897–1988) and Alfonso Peña Boeuf (1888–1966). The ITCE was a non-profit organization dedicated to developing and applying technical innovations in engineering civil structures.

The white Arco de la Victoria was built in Madrid in 1956 to commemorate the Nationalist victory in the Civil War. The 39 metres (128 ft) arch was designed by Pascual Bravo and Lopez Otero. López Otero died at his home in Madrid on 23 December 1962 a few days after an operation for kidney disease. He was 77 years old.

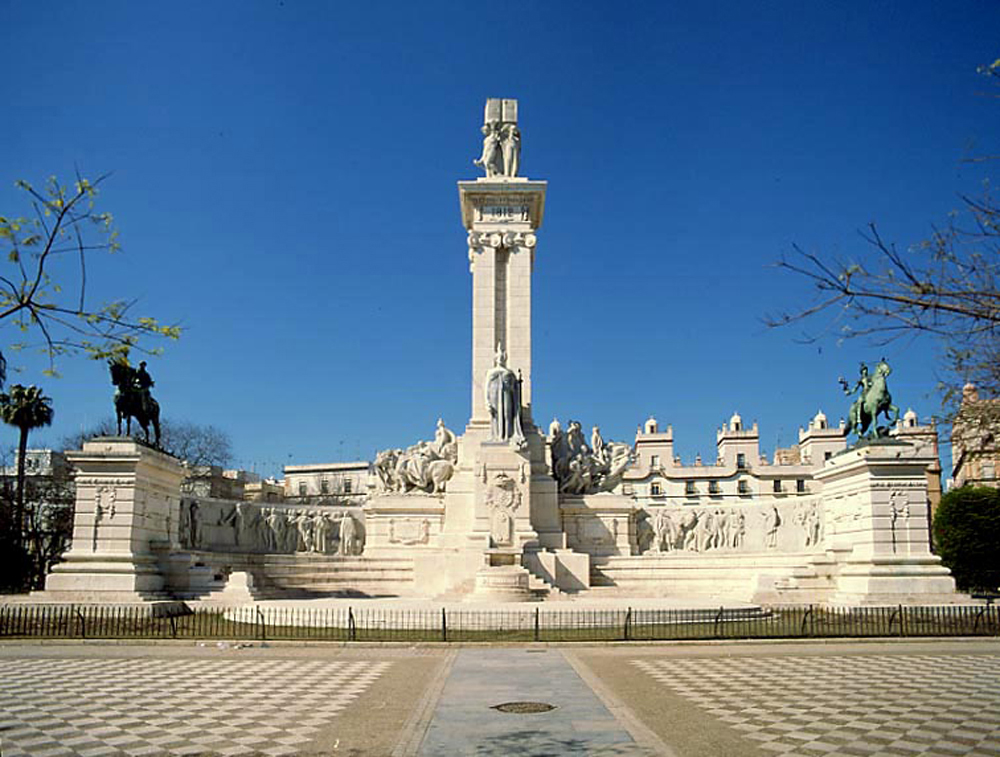
Monument to the Constitution of 1812

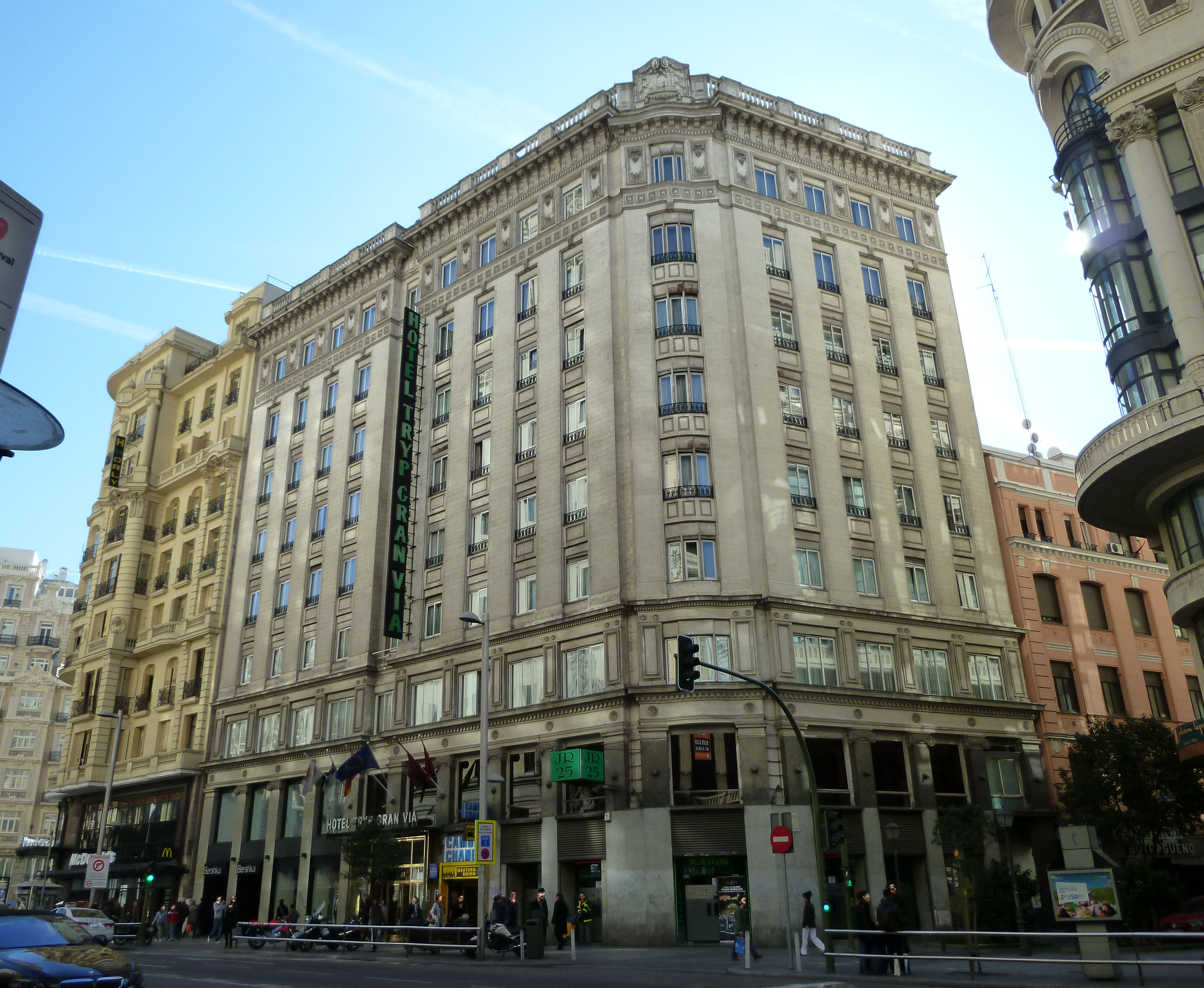
Hotel Gran Vía, Madrid

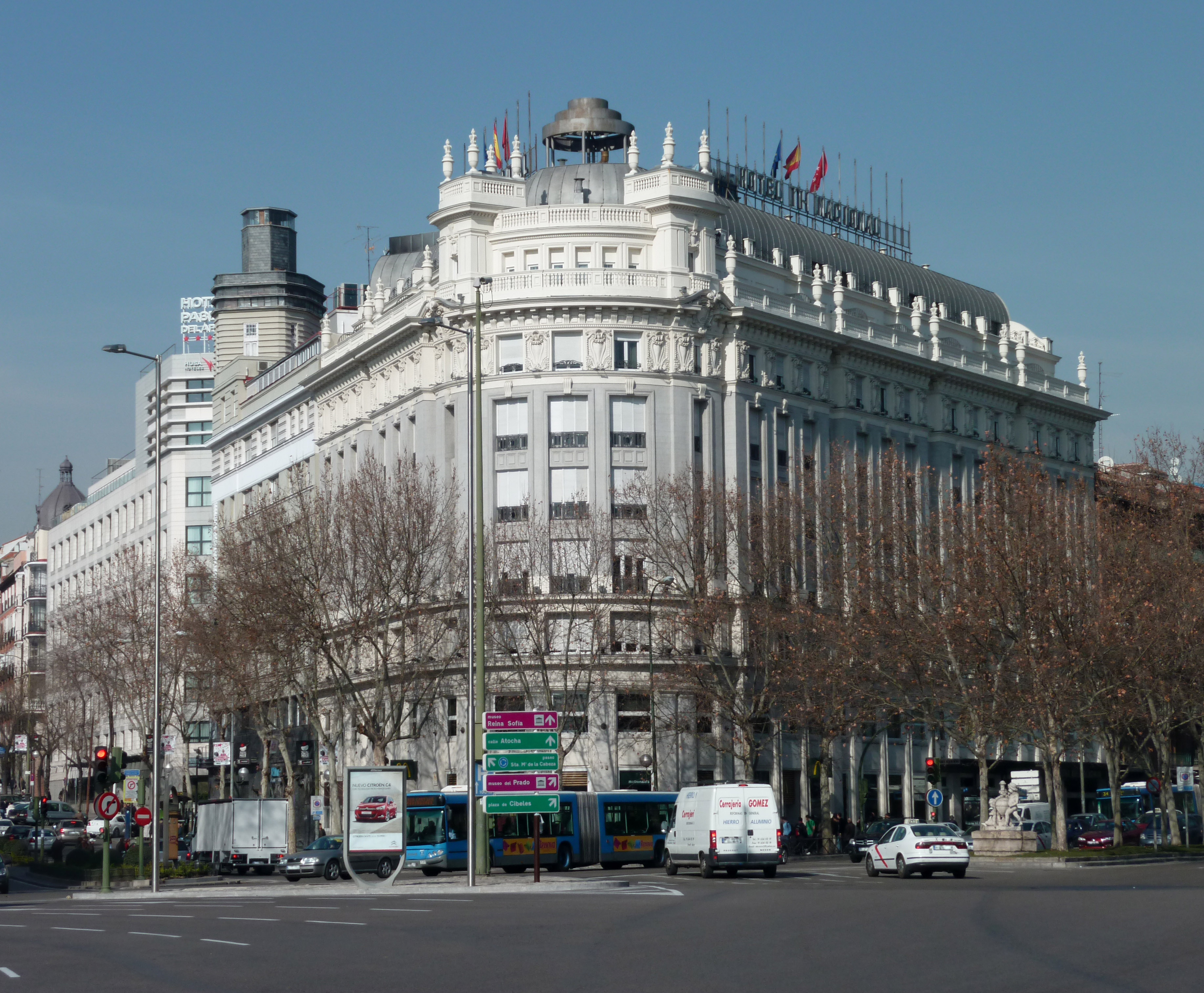
Hotel Nacional de Madrid

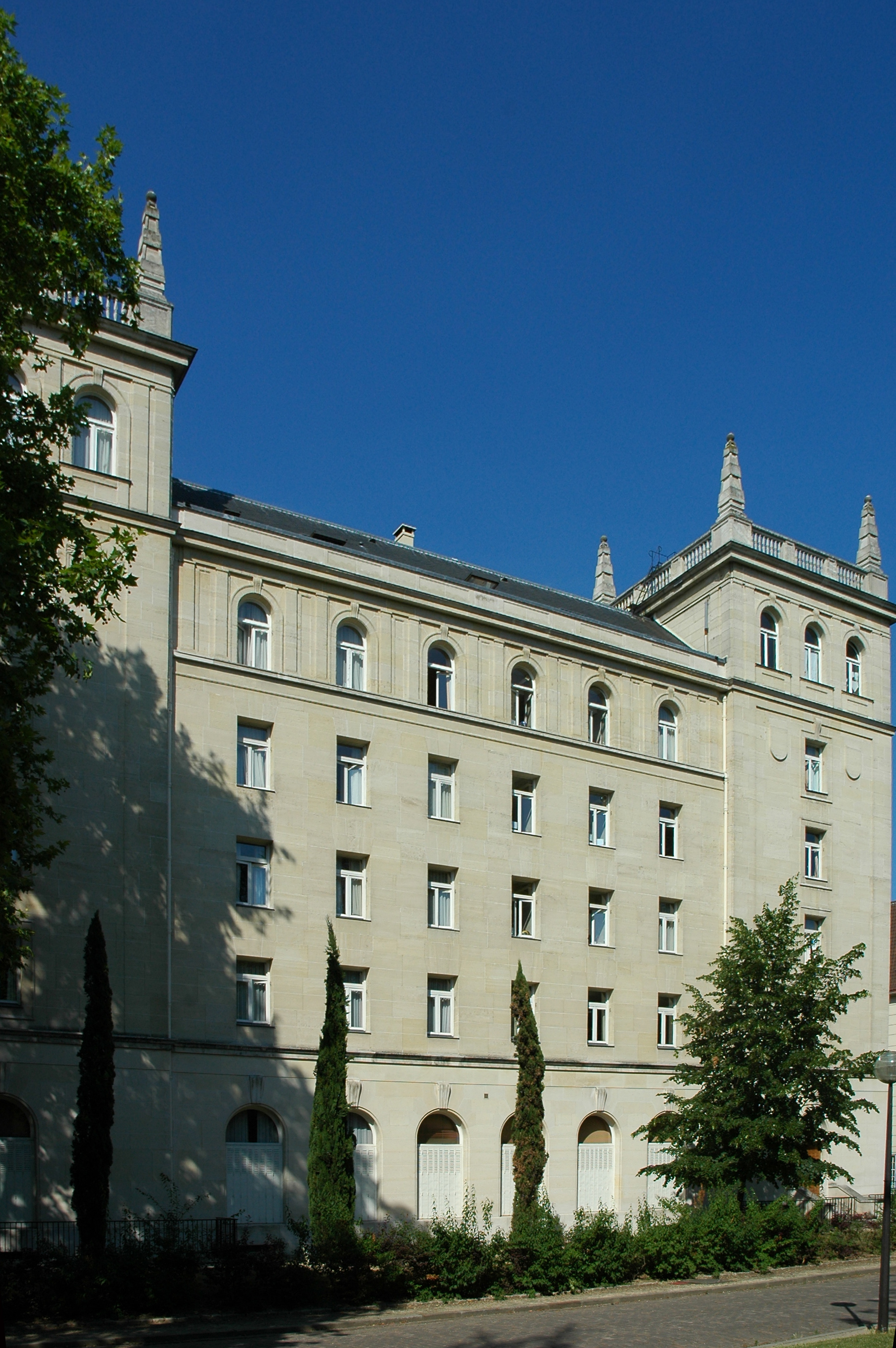
Colegio de España in the University City of París

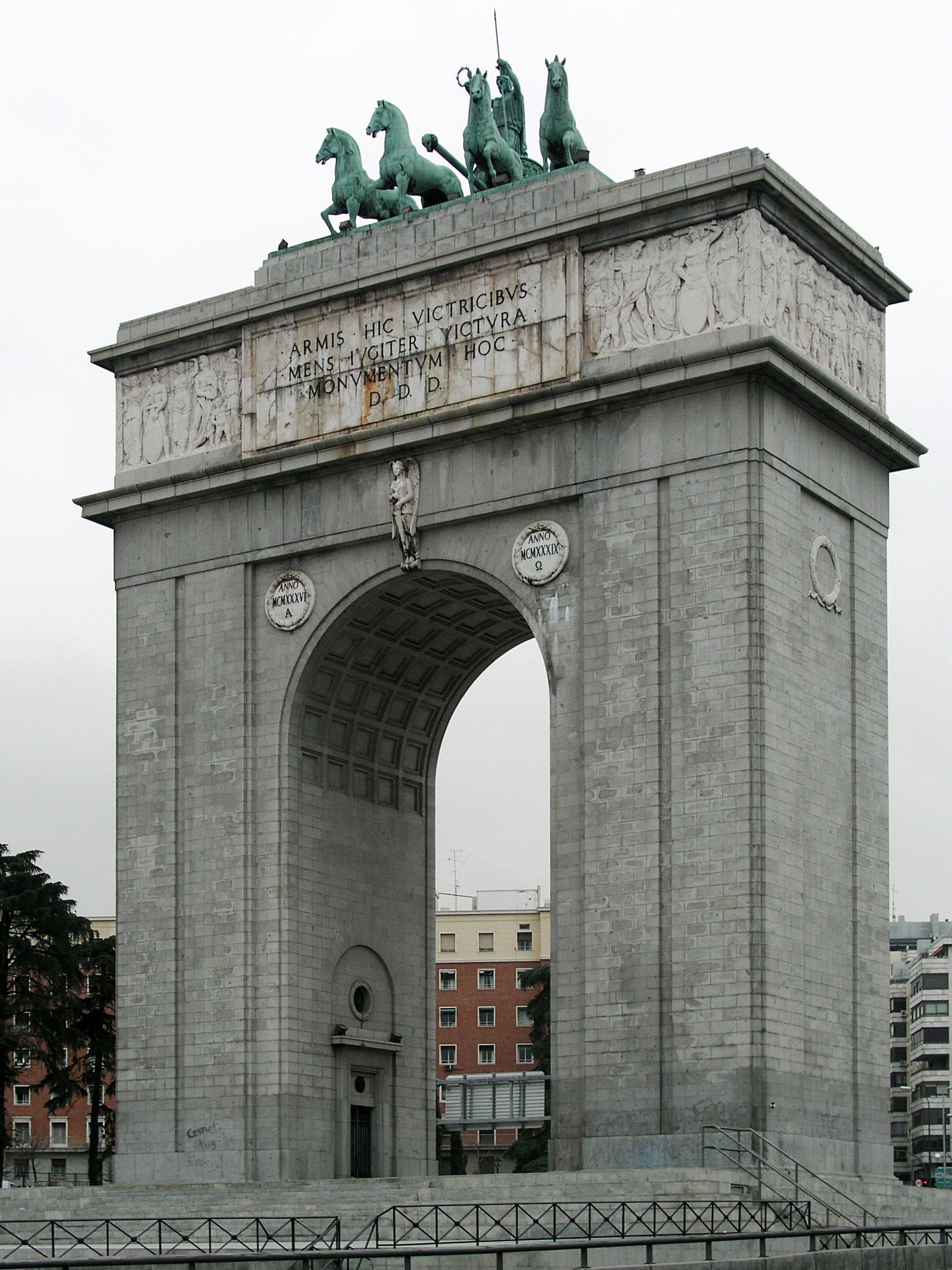
Arco de la Victoria, Madrid

== Representative works ==
- University City of Madrid
- Monument to the Constitution of 1812
- Hotel Gran Vía de Madrid
- Hotel Nacional de Madrid
- Hotel Cristina de Sevilla (destroyed)
- Gran Hotel de Salamanca (destroyed)
- Unión y el Fénix Español building at 23 calle de Alcalá (together with Miguel de los Santos)
- Torre de la calle de Peligros
- Arco de la Victoria, Madrid
- Almacenes Rodríguez en Madrid (destroyed)
- Colegio de España in the University City of París

== Publications ==
- Modesto López Otero; Miguel Blay y Fábregas (1926). Una influencia española en la arquitectura norteamericana. Real Academia de Bellas Artes de San Fernando. p. 35.
- Modesto López Otero; Elías Tormo y Monzó (1932). La Técnica moderna en la conservación de monumentos: discursos leídos ante la Academia de la Historia el día 3 de enero de 1932. Artes Gráficas Faure. p. 40.
- Modesto López Otero (1944). Ventura Rodríguez y su obra en Navarra. Real Academia de Bellas Artes de San Fernando. p. 74.
- Javier Lasso de La Vega; Modesto López Otero (1948). La Biblioteca como edificio funcional, su construcción y equipo, por Javier Lasso de La Vega. Con un prólogo de... Modesto López Otero,... Gráficos González. p. 215.
- Diego Angulo Iñiguez; Modesto López Otero (1958). La arquitectura neoclásica en Méjico: Discurso leído el día 30 de noviembre de 1958 en su recepción pública. Real Academia de Bellas artes de San Fernando. p. 38.
- Luis Gutiérrez Soto; Modesto López Otero (1960). Breves consideraciones sobre la nueva arquitectura. Real Academia de Bellas Artes de San Fernando. p. 64.

== Sources ==
- Antuña Bernardo, Joaquín (2003). "Manuel Sánchez Arcas (1897-1970) y Eduardo Torreja Miret (1899-1961)" (PDF). Colección Arquíthemas (in Spanish) (12). fundación caja de arquitectos.
- Atherton, Elizabeth; Warne, Sophia (2014-06-02). DK Eyewitness Travel Guide: Madrid. DK Publishing. ISBN 978-1-4654-3100-4.
- Camprubí, Lino (2014-05-02). Engineers and the Making of the Francoist Regime. MIT Press. ISBN 978-0-262-02717-5.
- Cooke, Linda W. (2007). Frontiers in Higher Education. Nova Publishers. ISBN 978-1-60021-113-3.
- "Manuel Sánchez Arcas". epdlp.
- Sánchez de Lerín García-Ovies (December 2000). "Modesto López Otero Vida y Obra" (PDF). (Doctoral Thesis). Madrid.
