= Manuel Martín =

Manuel Martín or Martin may refer to:

- Manuel Ángel Martín (born 1980), Spanish boccia player
- Manuel Martín (weightlifter) (born 1977), Spanish weightlifter
- Manuel Martín, Jr. (1934–2002), theater director
- Manuel Martín Madrid (born 1938), Spanish architect
- José Manuel Martín (1924–2006), Spanish actor
- Manuel Martin (soccer) (1917–1997), American soccer player-coach
- Manuel Martin (conquistador), Spanish nobleman and conquistador
