= Jesús Martí Martín =

Spanish architect and painter

- Born: 1899; Castellón de la Plana, Spain
- Died: 1975 (aged 75–76); Mexico City, Mexico
- Occupation: Architect

Jesús Martí Martín (1899–1975) was a Spanish architect and painter. His first love was painting, but he trained as an architect and was successful in this profession in Madrid in the years before the Spanish Civil War. During the civil war he helped preserve national artistic treasures from the destruction of Madrid, and also designed bomb shelters. After the fall of the Second Spanish Republic in 1939 he fled to France, where he was interned for two months, then made his way to Paris and on to exile in Mexico. He resumed his career as an architect in Mexico, but gradually abandoned architecture in favour of painting. He chose not to exhibit his work and was little known until he was finally persuaded to put on a show in Mexico City at the age of 70, when he was acclaimed as a master of modern Mexican art.

== Early years ==
Jesús Martí Martín was born in Castellón de la Plana, Spain, in 1899. At an early age he decided to become a painter, but his father advised him to also study architecture so he could earn a living. He was educated at the Real Academia de Bellas Artes de San Fernando and at the Superior Technical School of Architecture of Madrid. At the student's residence in Madrid he became the friend of like-minded young men such as Salvador Dalí, Federico García Lorca, Luis Buñuel and Rafael Alberti. He completed his studies of architecture as an outstanding graduate when he was 24.

García Lomas proposed Martí as architect for the Madrid City Council. In this position he realized the first tall houses on the Goya and O'Donnell streets, but his most outstanding work was the plans for a group of low-cost house in El Escorial. He then moved to the north of Spain and built several summer residences. He collaborated with other architects in winning a competition for agricultural villages for the areas irrigated by the Guadalquivir and Guadalmellato. He and Manuel Sánchez Arcas designed a new building for the Center for Historical Studies. He was associated with the "Generation of '27", a group of architects involved in the European avant-garde at that time.

In 1929 Martí collaborated with Miguel García-Lomas Somoano on the Edificio Vita office building in the University District of Madrid. In 1930 he again collaborated with García-Lomas on the 8-story Viviendas Castaño, a collective housing building in the Goya barrio of the Salamanca district of Madrid. The building covers the area within the acute angle where Alcalá meets Ensanche, and resembles the rounded prow of a ship. It is a notable example of rationalist architecture. In 1931 he was a professor at the School of Architecture in Madrid when the Second Spanish Republic was proclaimed. He helped prevent some anti-monarchist groups from destroying the royal statues on the Plaza de Oriente, but was a strong supporter of the Republic and a member of the intellectual and artistic circles of Madrid. He continued to be very active as an architect.

During the Spanish Civil War (1936–39) Martí worked for the Ministry of Education in defense of national artistic treasures, and for the Popular Army in construction of bomb shelters. The director of the Defense Board was his close friend Josep Renau. Martí and the architect José Lino Vaamonde helped transfer the great masterpieces of the Madrid museums to Valencia, where they avoided being destroyed by Franco's artillery and bombers. They also helped design bomb shelters in the Cuatro Caminos and Pacífico neighborhoods of Madrid. In 1937 Martí and the architect Luis Lacasa^{(es)} attended the International Housing Congress in Moscow. After his return he was invited to designed the International Pavilion of the Spanish Republic in Paris but chose to stay in Madrid and continue designing shelters. When the war ended Martí and Luis Lacasa fled to France on foot. He was imprisoned at the Argelès-sur-Mer refugee camp for two months, then was released thanks to the efforts of Pablo Picasso. He settled in Paris with his wife Clotilde, selling his paintings for a living, then managed to move to Mexico.

== Mexico ==
Martí's first work in Mexico was with SERE (Servicio de Evacuación de Republicanos Españoles^{(es)}), and he also built some private residences in Mexico City and Cuernavaca. The entrepreneur Manuel Suárez y Suárez and Martí founded the company Vías y Obras (Roads and Works), which built facilities in the ports of Veracruz, Acapulco and other cities. Martí organized the company with the Valencian architect Enrique Segarra^{(it)}, Arturo Sáenz de la Calzada^{(es)} and the civil engineer Carlos Gaos. He also collaborated with other exiled architects including Félix Candela and Juan Rivaud. His most important work included the Hotel Mocambo in Veracruz and the Casino de la Selva in Cuernavaca.

In 1946 the Casino de la Selva was closed so that Vías y Obras could undertake various enlargements under the direction of Martí. The two blocks of rooms were each given a second floor, and a French-style garden was laid out in the area between them. New rooms were added to the main building. Other additions included a large convention hall, a bowling alley and cafeteria, a walkway around the Olympic pool, two more pools and sandy areas to give a beach-like atmosphere. The effect was much like the Hotel Mocambo. Félix Candela came to Mexico to escape Francoist Spain and worked for Vías y Obras from 1942 to 1947. He helped Martí in his renovation of the Casino de la Selva.

In Mexico Martí became a lifetime friend of several Spanish Republican exiles including the writer Emilio Prados, the philosopher José Gaos, the poets Manuel Altolaguirre and León Felipe, the poster artist Josep Renau and the painters Manuela Ballester^{(es)} and Enrique Climent^{(es)}. Martí spent more and more time painting, and eventually abandoned the practice of architecture. He painted for pleasure and did not try to sell or exhibit his work. His style reflected impressionist concepts, but he was not tied to any school. Under pressure from his friends including Jorge Hernández Campos, head of the Department of Plastic Arts of the National Institute of Fine Arts, he finally exhibited his paintings at the Palacio de Bellas Artes in Mexico City in 1970 when he was aged 70. His fresh and vigorous painting was acclaimed and he was called one of the masters of contemporary Mexican painting.

Martí died in Mexico City in 1975. There is a street named in his honour in Castellón.

== Sources ==
- Alarcón Azuela, Eduardo (2011), "Aquella primavera perdida... La historia del hotel Casino de la Selva en Cuernavaca", Bitácora arquitectura (in Spanish) (23)
- "Calle Jesús Martí Martín", Callejero.net (in Spanish), Hispanetwork Publicidad y Servicios, SL
- Edificio Vita (in Spanish), Fundación Arquitectura COAM, February 2014, archived from the original on 2018-10-05
- Jesús Martí Martín (in Spanish), Museo Nacional Centro de Arte Reina Sofía
- Lacruz, Francisco Agramunt (2017-02-28), "Jesús Martí Martín (1899–1975)", Arte en las alambradas: Artistas españoles en campos de concentración, exterminio y gulags (in Spanish), Universitat de València, ISBN 978-84-9134-047-8
- Martí Martín, Jesús (PDF) (in Spanish), UNAM: Universidad Nacional Autónoma de México, archived from the original (PDF) on 2018-05-11
- Viviendas Castaño (in Spanish), Fundación Arquitectura COAM, archived from the original on 2018-10-05
