= Eduardo Torroja =

Spanish structural engineer (1899–1961)

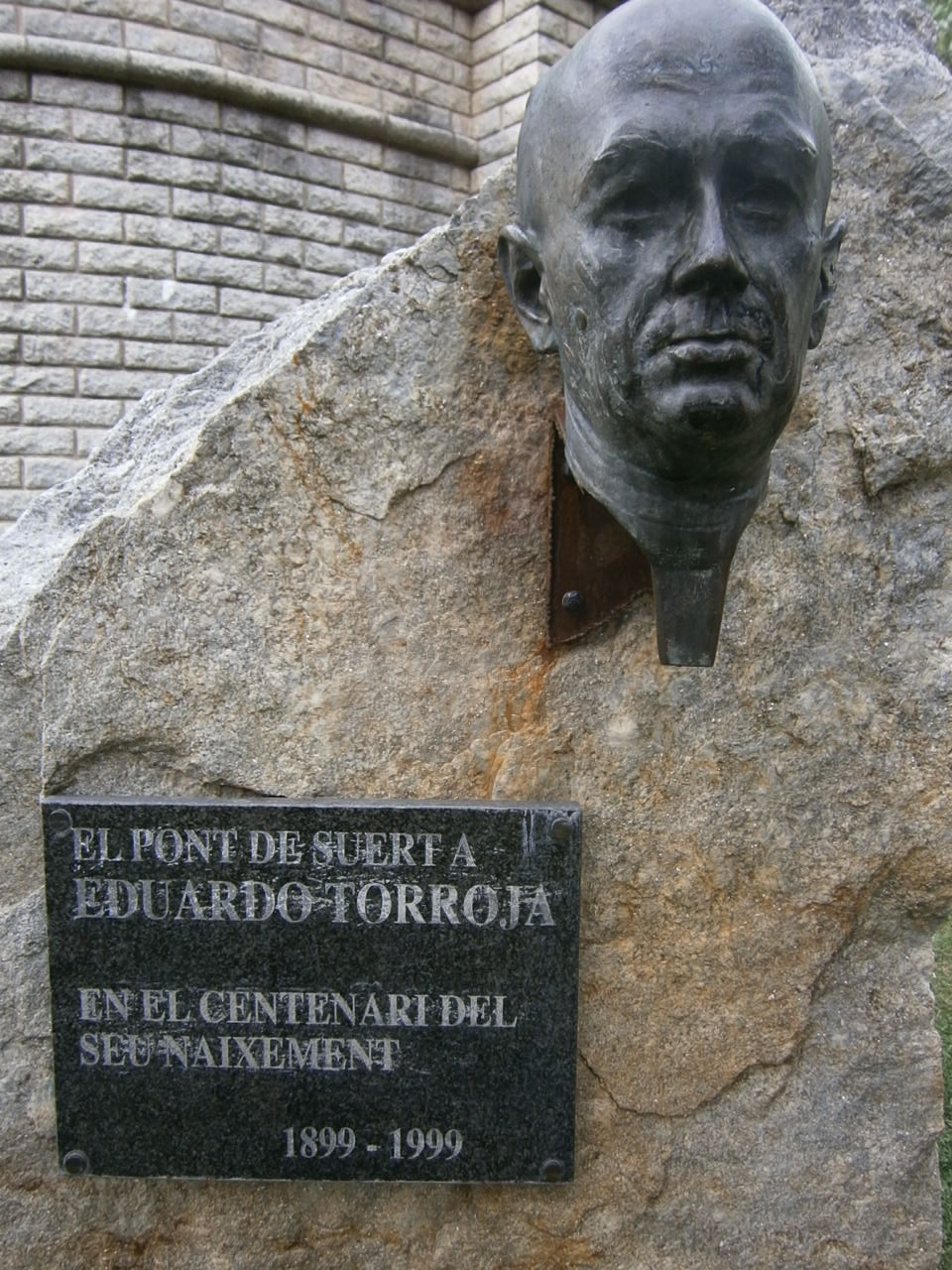
- Born: 27 August 1899; Madrid Spain
- Died: 15 June 1961 (aged 61)
- Engineering career
- Projects: Tempul cable-stayed aqueduct
- Significant advance: Concrete-shell structures
- Awards: Wilhelm Exner Medal, 1954

Eduardo Torroja y Miret, 1st Marquess of Torroja (27 August 1899 – 15 June 1961) was a Spanish structural engineer and a pioneer in the design of concrete shell structures.

== Education ==
Torroja was born in Madrid where he studied civil engineering.

== Career ==
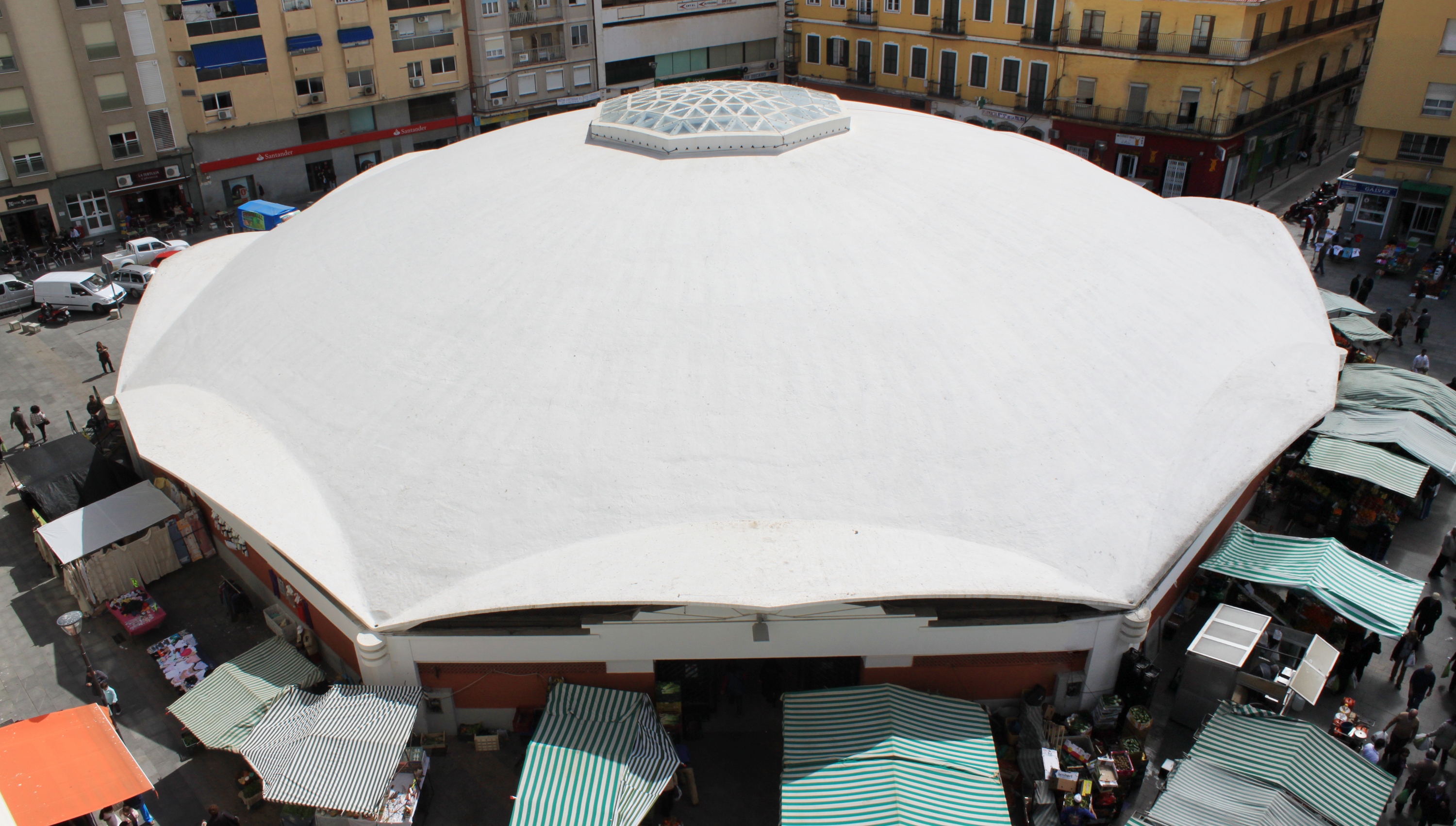
Ingeniero Torroja Market, Algeciras

In 1923 Torroja began work for the Hidrocivil company, headed by the engineer José Eugenio Ribera. He planned and directed various types of projects, including the foundations of bridge piers, bridges, water supply and sanitation works, and various urban buildings. Torroja's first large project was the Tempul cable-stayed aqueduct (1926) in Guadalete, Jerez de la Frontera, in which he used pre-stressed girders. In 1928 he established his own office.

Modesto López Otero, director for the Madrid University City (Ciudad Universitaria de Madrid) project, formed a diverse team of young architects to design the various buildings. Torroja joined the group in 1929. He worked with Manuel Sánchez Arcas, sharing his interest in new architectural forms that rejected preconceived formulas. The first collaborative work of Torroja and Sanchez Arcas was the pavilion of the Construction Commission of the university city, completed in June 1931. They worked on the heating plant (Central Térmica) and the clinical hospital for the university city.

Sánchez Arcas and Torroja designed an enclosed and semi-spherical shell for the 1932 Algeciras market hall. The 9 centimetres (3.5 in) thick concrete roof was 47.5 metres (156 ft) high, vaulted, supported on eight pillars. As an engineering work it is considered Torroja's masterpiece. Sánchez Arcas and Torroja founded the journal Hormigón y Acero (Concrete and Steel). In 1934 they founded the Instituto Técnico de la Construcción y Edificación (ITCE, Technical Institute of Construction and Building). Other founding members were the architect Modesto López Otero (1885–1962) and the engineers José María Aguirre Gonzalo (1897–1988) and Alfonso Peña Boeuf (1888–1966). The ITCE was a non-profit organization dedicated to developing and applying technical innovations in engineering civil structures.

In 1952, Eduardo Torroja – along with André Balency-Béran, Emile Nenning, Louis Baes, Hubert Hüsch and Georg Wästlund – founded the Comité Européen du Béton, which is now the Fédération Internationale du Béton. The Comité Européen du Béton sought to coordinate the research effort on structural concrete in Europe following the end of the Second World War.

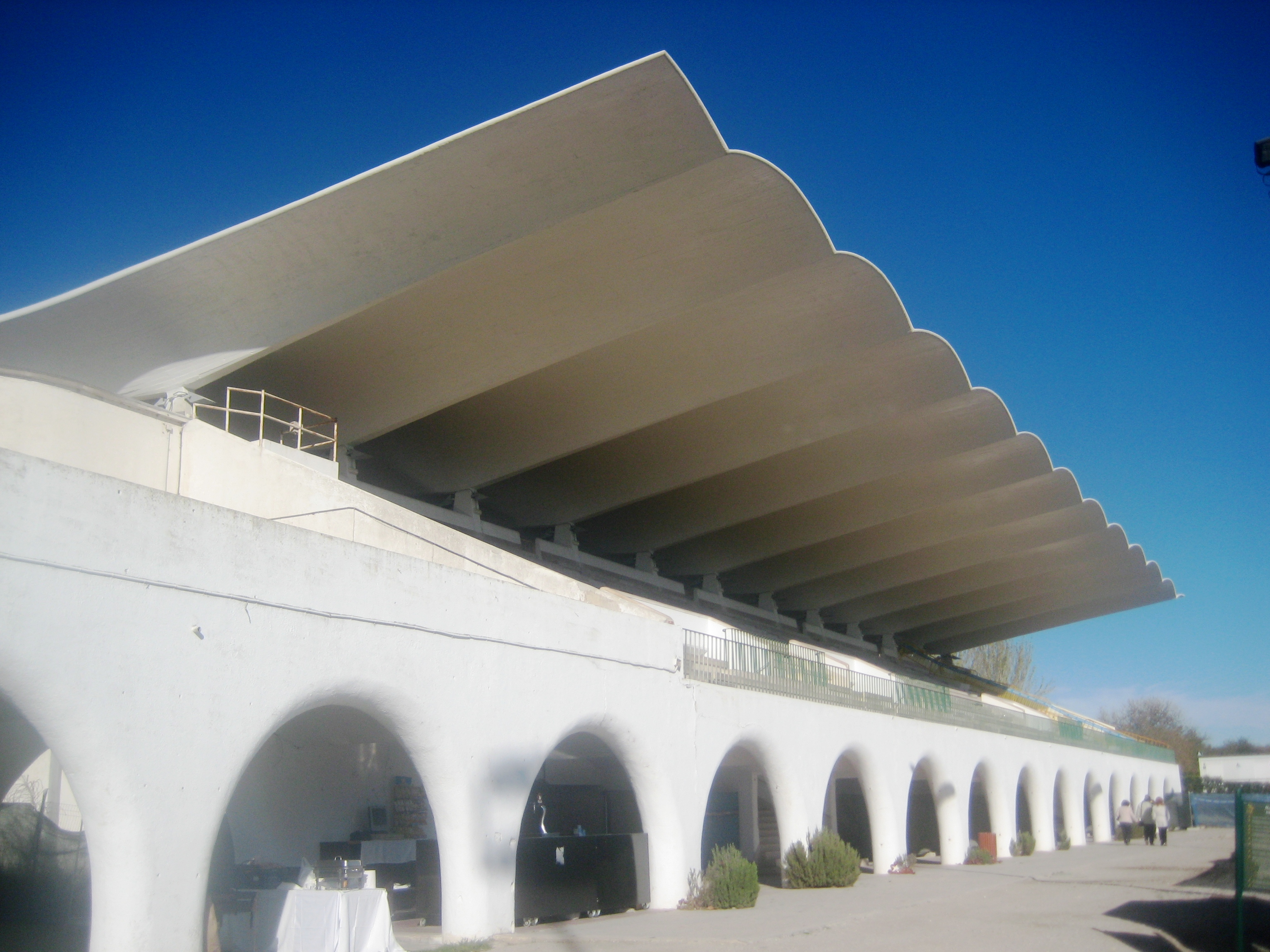
Roof of La Zarzuela Racetrack, Madrid, Spain

Eduardo Torroja designed the thin-shell water tower in Fedala and the roof of the "La Zarzuela" racetrack in Madrid in the form of a hyperboloid. He also used steel with great élan, as at the roof of the Football Stadium, Barcelona (1943). He designed innovative structures in numerous parts of the world, including Morocco and Latin America. His books include Philosophy of Structures (1958) and The Structures of Eduardo Torroja (1958).

== Personal characteristics ==
Torroja believed that a structure should reflect the personality of its designer. Some believe every specific twist and turn in a structure reflects an important event in one's life. Believing in the latter, Torroja developed new ways of looking at structures as well as ways to increase the strength of the structures without dimming aesthetics. Torroja illustrated an interest in forms of art that dwindled within most of his structures which often incorporated his visions.

== Socioeconomic and political environment ==
In the 1920s, Europe was left in ruins to struggle with economic and political recovery. Since Spain was short on steel supplies, Torroja had to pursue other materials. In his search for new materials, Torroja became famous for his exploration of alternative uses for horse manure, which was found to be a strong and cheap in-cost material. Today, Torroja is renowned for his development of reinforced concrete.

== Sources ==
- Adriaenssens, Sigrid; Block, Philippe; Veenendaal, Diederik; Williams, Chris (21 March 2014). Shell Structures for Architecture: Form Finding and Optimization. Routledge. ISBN 978-1-317-90938-5.
- Antuña Bernardo, Joaquín (2003). "Manuel Sánchez Arcas (1897-1970) y Eduardo Torreja Miret (1899-1961)" (PDF). Colección Arquíthemas (in Spanish) (12). fundación caja de arquitectos.
- Camprubí, Lino (2 May 2014). Engineers and the Making of the Francoist Regime. MIT Press. ISBN 978-0-262-02717-5.
- Hart-Davis, Adam (16 April 2012). "Eduardo Torroja". Engineers. DK Publishing. ISBN 978-1-4654-0682-8.
- "Manuel Sánchez Arcas". epdlp.
- "The Art of Structure". Time. 1 June 1959. Archived from the original on 26 October 2012.
- Troyano, Leonardo (2003). Bridge Engineering: A Global Perspective. Thomas Telford Publishing.
