= Euripide Foundoukidis =

Greek administrator (1894–1968)

- Born: 1894; Greece
- Died: 11 September 1968 (aged 73–74)
- Occupations: Administrator, Museologist
- Known for: Head of International Office of Museums

Euripide Foundoukidis (Greek: Ευριπίδης Φουντουκίδης, romanized: Evripidis Fountoukidis; 1894 – 11 September 1968) was a Greek administrator at the International Institute of Intellectual Cooperation (IIIC) who ran the International Office of Museums (IOM) for many years.

== Early years (1894–1929) ==
Euripide Foundoukidis was born in Greece in 1894. He studied in Paris at the Institute of Higher International Studies and the School for Advanced Studies in the Social Sciences. Foundoukidis has also been called a lawyer and art historian. He became a civil servant in the Greek government, and represented the government in the 1920 Postal Union Congress in Madrid. He also edited the journal Phos. He became cultural advisor to the Greek Embassy in Paris. In January 1929 Foundoukidis became an attache at the Section of Artistic Relations in the International Institute of Intellectual Cooperation (IIIC), an advisory body to the League of Nations.

== International Office of Museums (1929–1941) ==
In April 1929 Foundoukidis was appointed Secretary of the IIIC's International Office of Museums (IOM). He served under Jules Destrée. Foundoukidis was open-minded and multi-lingual, and introduced a more internationalist and professional attitude to the IMO. In 1931 at a conference in Athens he was the first to use the French term patrimoine to refer to artistic heritage, and other international organizations soon began to use the patrimoine in this sense. He was made Secretary General of the IOM in 1931, holding office until after the start of World War II (1939–45). With Foundoukidis as its effective leader the IMO began to organize international conferences which drew very large numbers of attendees. The Germans were generally opposed to the IIIC and would not cooperate with the IMO or other League of Nations units, but to some extent Foundoukidis was able to counteract this divide through his diplomacy and human qualities, creating strong personal but unofficial links.

Under Foundoukidis the OIM was involved in the debate over acquisition of archaeological materials, and proposed that the OIM could facilitate resolution of disputes between a collecting institution and the country of origin. The 1933 OIM Draft came into operation whenever an object was alienated or exported contrary to national legislation, whether the object was from a collection or from an archaeological excavation. When stelae removed from Tell el-Amarna in Egypt were illegally exported and offered for sale in Europe, Foundoukidis advised that the OIM draft applied to both movables and immovables, such as "fragments of monuments". However, later versions of the OIM Draft did exclude objects from archaeological sites. The OIM also facilitated international exchange of cultural objects by promoting international exhibits and circulation of casts. Under a Leagues of Nations resolution the OIM became the clearing house for all information about international exhibitions.

During the Spanish Civil War, on 16 November 1936 eight incendiary bombs fell on the Museo del Prado in Madrid, causing considerable damage to the structure. The architect José Lino Vaamonde drew up a detailed plan of the impact of the bombs, with photographs, the next day. The plan and photographs were published in Mouseion, the press organ of the International Office of Museums, directed by Foundoukidis, in October 1937.

== Later career (1941–68) ==
In September 1941 the IOM suspended operations as a result of World War II. Foundoukidis left the IIIC in 1946. He remained the honorary director of the Hellenic society at the Cité Internationale Universitaire de Paris. He also became secretary of the International Commission of Folklore and Folk Arts (CIAP), a unit of UNESCO's Commission for Philosophy and Historical Sciences (CIPHS). In 1951 he was replaced in this position by Jorje Dias of Portugal. Foundoukidis died on 11 September 1968. He was a Knight of the Legion of Honour.

== Publications ==
Publications by Foundoukidis included:

- Euripide Foundoukidis (1922), L'Internationalisation des étroits maritimes et le nouveau statut international des détroits de Constantinople, Paris: Les Éditions internationales, p. 71
- Euripide Foundoukidis (1936), L'Oeuvre internationale de Jules Destrée dans le domaine des arts (Extrait de "Mouseion". Volume 33-34, 1936), Paris: Office international des musées, p. 14
- Charles De Visscher; Euripide Foundoukidis (1936), La Protection internationale des monuments historiques et des oeuvres d'art en temps de guerre (Extrait de Mouseion), Paris: Institut international de coopération intellectuelle. Office international des musées, p. 24
- Euripide Foundoukidis (1936), La Règlementation des concours internationaux d'architecture (Extrait de "Mouseion". Vol. 35-36), Paris: Office international des musées, p. 21
- Euripide Foundoukidis (1937), L'Activité de l'Office international des musées en 1934-1935, Institut international de coopération intellectuelle, p. 28
- Euripide Foundoukidis (1937–1938), La Coopération intellectuelle dans le domaine des arts, de l'archéologie et de l'ethnologie. Année 1937 [-1938] (Extraits de "Mouseion"), Paris: Office international des musées
- Euripide Foundoukidis (1937), Research in the field of archeology and the history of art, Paris: International museums office (printed by Jouve), p. 22
- Euripide Foundoukidis (1937), Tableau des activités du département d'art, d'archéologie et d'ethnologie, Paris: impr. Union; Société des nations, Institut international de coopération intellectuelle, p. 16
- Charles De Visscher; Euripide Foundoukidis (1937), La Protection internationale des monuments historiques et des oeuvres d'art en temps de guerre (Extrait de "Mouseion", volume 35-36), Paris: IIIC Office international des musées, p. 24
- Euripide Foundoukidis (1940), Problèmes internationaux d'art et d'archéologie. I, Paris: Office international des musées, p. 93
- Euripide Foundoukidis (1945), Les Travaux de l'Office international des musées et organismes associés pendant la période juin 1940 à janvier 1945, Paris: Office international des musées, p. 16
- Euripide Foundoukidis (1945), La Reconstruction sur le plan cultural, Paris: Office international des musées, p. 28

== Sources ==
- Euripide Foundoukidis (1894-1968) (in French), BnF: Bibliothèque nationale de France
- McClellan, Andrew (2008-01-02), The Art Museum from Boullée to Bilbao, Univ of California Press, ISBN 978-0-520-25126-7
- Meyer, Andrea; Savoy, Benedicte (2014-01-01), The Museum Is Open: Towards a Transnational History of Museums 1750-1940, De Gruyter, ISBN 978-3-11-029882-6
- Négri, Vincent (2014-03-07), Le patrimoine culturel, cible des conflits armés: De la guerre civil espagnole aux guerres du 21è siècle (in French), Bruylant, ISBN 978-2-8027-3942-5
- Stöckmann, Jan (10 August 2015), "Foundoukidis, Euripide", UNESCO Archives AtoM Catalogue, UNESCO
- Thompson, Stith (1996), A Folklorist's Progress: Reflections of a Scholar's Life, Indiana University Press, ISBN 1-879407-08-6
- Vadi, Valentina; Witte, Bruno de (2015-02-11), Culture and International Economic Law, Routledge, ISBN 978-1-317-91076-3
- Vrdoljak, Ana Filipa (2006-07-13), International Law, Museums and the Return of Cultural Objects, Cambridge University Press, ISBN 978-0-521-84142-9
- Winiwarter, Verena (March 2015), The role of cultural heritage for the sustainable development of the Danube Region (DIANET International School Proceedings), Klagenfurt: Alpen-Adria-Universität, CiteSeerX 10.1.1.870.6195
