= Monument to the Constitution of 1812 =

Commemorative monument in Cádiz, Spain

- Monumento a la Constitución de 1812
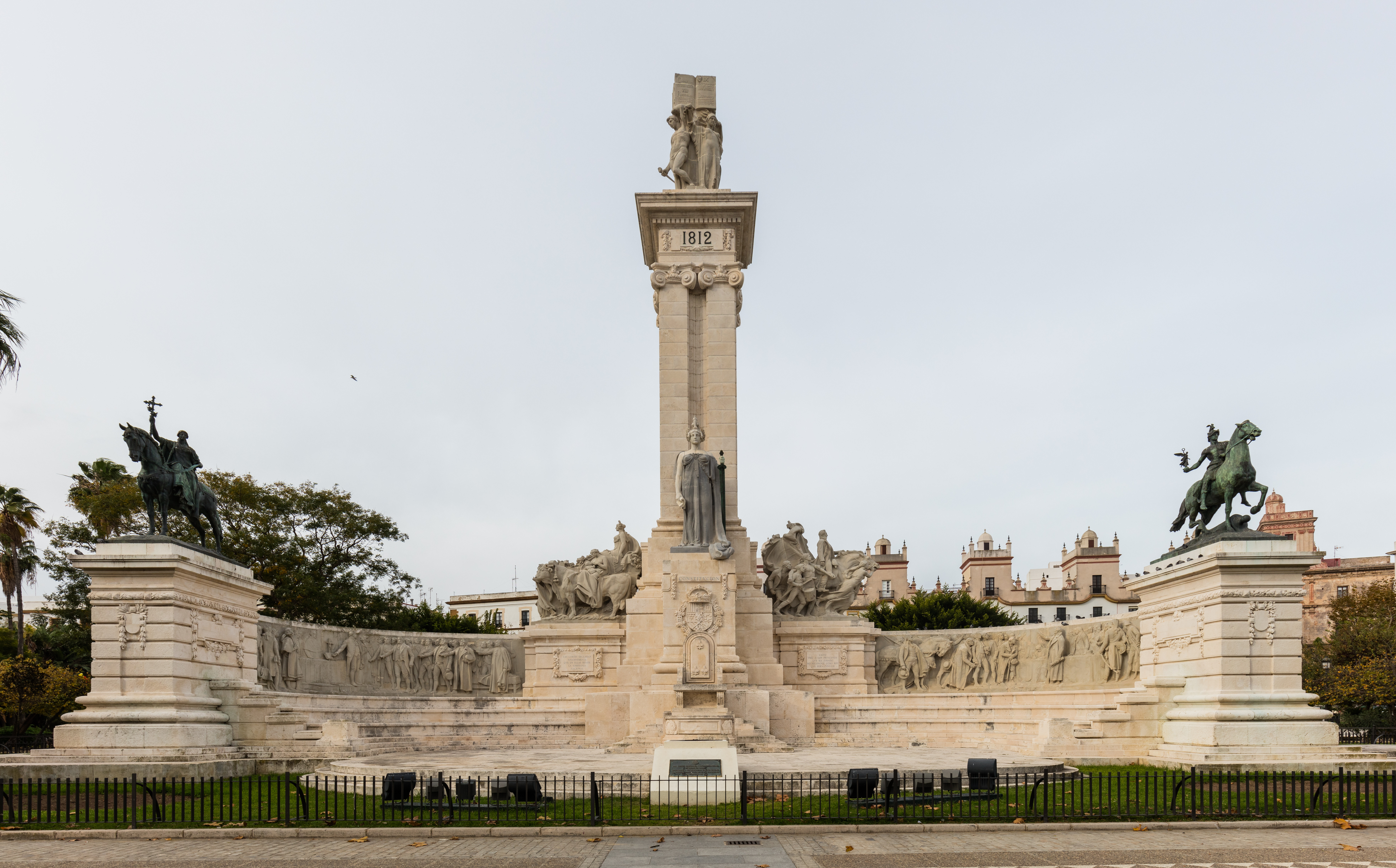
- Interactive map of Monument to the Constitution of 1812
- Location: Cádiz, Spain
- Coordinates: 36°32′6″N 6°17′35″W
- Beginning date: 1912
- Completion date: 1929

The Monument to the Constitution of 1812 is a monument in Cádiz, Spain, that commemorates the centennial of the signing of the Constitution of 1812. The monument, commissioned in 1912 and completed in 1929, is located in the centre of the Plaza de España in Cádiz.

== History ==
The Spanish Constitution of 1812 was briefly in effect between 1812 and 1814, and again between 1820 and 1823. Though limited in longevity, the Constitution of 1812 had a significant impact on burgeoning nationalism and liberalism not only in Spain but throughout Western Europe and the Americas. The constitution was drafted by the Cortes of Cádiz at a time when Cádiz was one of the few free Spanish cities during the Peninsular War.

The monument, designed by Modesto López Otero and sculpted by Aniceto Marinas, was commissioned by the Spanish government in 1912 to celebrate the centennial of the Constitution of 1812 as well as the Cortes of Cádiz. The monument was completed in 1929.

The lower level of the monument represents a chamber and an empty presidential armchair. The upper level has various inscriptions surmounting the chamber. On each side are bronze figures representing peace and war. In the centre, a pilaster rises to symbolize, in allegorical terms, the principles expressed in the 1812 constitution. At the foot of this pilaster, there is a female figure representing Spain and to either side, sculptural groupings representing agriculture and citizenship.

== Similar monuments ==
Many other monuments to the Constitution of 1812 were erected through the Spanish-speaking world but were destroyed through subsequent regime changes. Some remaining monuments include:

- Plaza de la Constitución, Mexico City, Mexico;
- Constitution Square, Montevideo, Uruguay;
- Monument to the Constitution of 1812, Comayagua, Honduras; and
- Constitution of 1812 Monument, St. Augustine, Florida, United States.
