= José Lino Vaamonde =

Spanish architect

José Lino Vaamonde Valencia
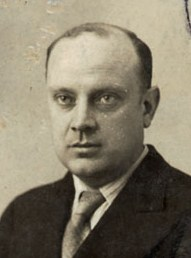
- Vaamonde from his identity card for the 1937 Paris Exposition
- Born: 20 April 1900; Alongos, Orense, Spain
- Died: 3 October 1986 (aged 86); Caracas, Venezuela
- Occupation: Architect

José Lino Vaamonde Valencia (20 April 1900 – 3 October 1986) was a Spanish architect who played a leading role in preserving the nation's artistic treasures during the Spanish Civil War (1936–1939). Following the civil war he went into exile in Venezuela, where he became the head architect of the Shell subsidiary and developed a range of buildings including service stations, oil camps, colleges and office buildings.

== Early years (1900–1935) ==
José Lino Vaamonde Valencia was born in Alongos, Orense, Spain, on 20 April 1900. He was one of eight brothers born into a family connected with the counts of Torre de Penela. He studied Exact Sciences at the Central University (1921) and Architecture at the Superior Technical School of Architecture of Madrid (1927).

He qualified as an architect in 1928. He worked at the Cadastre Service of the Ministry of Finance, and was a founder of the Architects' Association of Madrid.

Vaamonde participated in construction of the Madrid Metro and the Ourense-Santiago railway.He was also secretary of the Real Madrid football club.

In 1934 he married Flora Horcada. They had one son born in Valencia in 1937.

From December 1935 Vaamonde was an active member of the Republican Left (IR).

== Spanish Civil War (1936–1939) ==
In 1936 Vaamonde was appointed architect-conservator of the Museo del Prado, and in 1937 was a member of the Central Treasury of the Artistic Board, chaired by Timoteo Pérez Rubio^{(es)}. In August 1936 the museum's deputy director Francisco Javier Sánchez Cantón^{(es)} had the paintings moved to the lower parts of the Prado. On 16 November 1936 eight incendiary bombs fell on the museum, causing considerable damage to the structure. Vaamonde drew up a detailed plan of the impact of the bombs, with photographs, the next day. The plan and photographs were published in Mouseion, the press organ of the International Office of Museums directed by Euripide Foundoukidis, in October 1937.

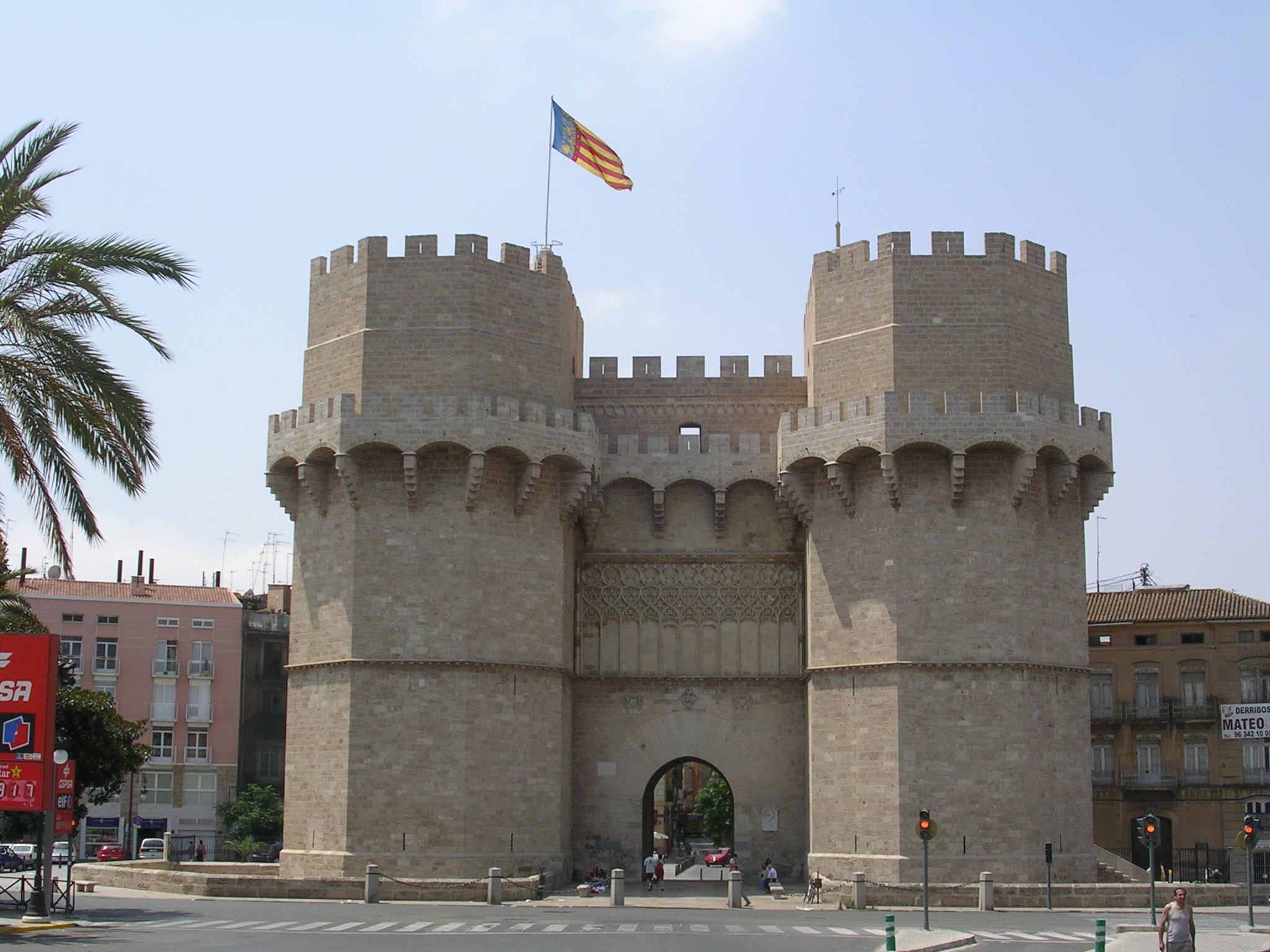
Torres de Serranos, Valencia

Prompted by Josep Renau, Director General of Fine Arts, the Republican government ordered the transfer of works from the Museo del Prado to Valencia for safekeeping, along with other works that had been seized. Jesús Martí Martín and Vaamonde helped transfer the masterpieces of the Madrid museums to Valencia, where they avoided being destroyed by Franco's artillery and bombers.

Vaamonde was appointed head architect of the Junta Central de Incautación, Protección y Salvamento del Tesoro Artístico (Central Board for Seizure, Protection and Rescue of the Artistic Treasure). He was in charge of security of the museum, reception of the masterpieces moved to Valencia, and preparation of places where the works would be conserved in that city. Vaamonde converted the Torres de Serranos and the Church of the Colegio del Patriarca as repositories for the salvaged artwork. In 1937 a foreign delegation was invited to review the preservation work, and the English members published a very favorable article about what had been done in The Times.

Martí and Vaamonde helped design bomb shelters in the Cuatro Caminos and Pacífico neighborhoods of Madrid.

Vaamonde was also Deputy General Commissioner for the Spanish Pavilion in the 1937 Exposition Internationale des Arts et Techniques dans la Vie Moderne in Paris, Secretary of Propaganda in 1938, and then Delegate in Paris of the National Committee for Aid to Republican Spain in place of Victoria Kent.

== Venezuela (1939–1986) ==
After the Republican defeat Vaamonde stayed briefly in Paris and Havana, then went into exile in Venezuela. He arrived in Venezuela in 1939. He spent his first years in Valencia working in commerce. In 1942 the Spanish General Office of Architecture imposed on Vaamonde "perpetual disqualification for exercise of the profession in public, managerial and trust positions and disqualification from private practice of the profession for thirty years". Around 1945 Vaamonde moved to Caracas. He collaborated with Joaquín Ortiz García on the Edificio Peque (1946) in the San Bernardino district of de Caracas.

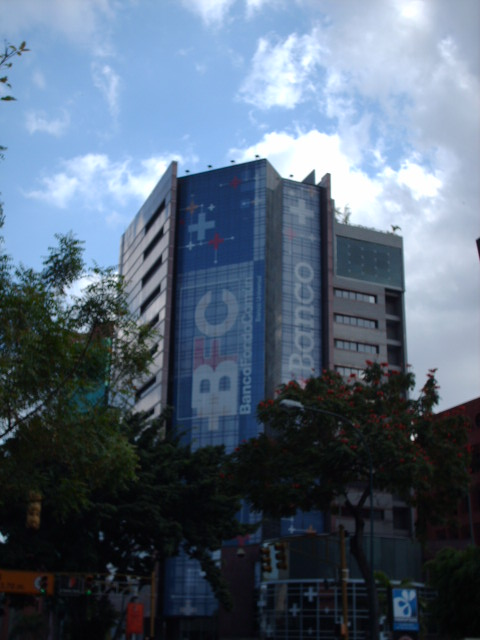
Torre BFC (Banco Fondo Común), formerly the Shell headquarters in Caracas

In 1946 Vaamonde started to work for Shell Venezuela, where he held various positions before becoming the company's consulting architect, a very senior position. When he joined the company it was in the process of consolidating its Caracas headquarters into a single building, which would not be completed until 1950 and at the time was the largest office building in the city. He founded and organized the company's architectural services, initially concerned with design and planning of homes, hospitals, clubs and schools, which until then had been purchased prefabricated or pre-designed. This led to provision of residences and infrastructure for the oil camps. Vaamonde developed oil camps such as Lagunillas (1954) and Altagracia (1958), self-contained communities where the workers were isolated from the "wild" exterior. In the 1950s the architecture section began to undertake design of service stations and gas stations, the most visible aspect of the company to the citizens. Vaamonde directed completion of the first service stations, Blandín and Las Mercedes in Caracas.

Vaamonde became a Venezuelan citizen in 1952. In the 8th Pan-American Architecture Congress, in Mexico City in 1952, Vaamonde presented part of the work developed for Shell. He also participated in the 9th Congress, held in Caracas in 1955.

Vaamonde designed the Shell Service for the Farmer building in Cagua (1952), the Lagunillas Craft Training Center (1953), the Club Manaure in Punta Cardón (1953), the Burns Unit of the Shell Hospital in Maracaibo (1955), the Colegio Claret in Caracas (1957), the Colegio San Francisco Javier in Punto Fijo (1959), the Colegio Santo Ángel in Maturín (1959) and the office building of the Cardón Refinery (1959). His last project before he retired was the Shell de Chuao building in Caracas (1957–60), the new headquarters of the company, in collaboration with Diego Carbonell and Miguel Salvador. Unlike the former Shell headquarters, which had a Beaux Arts style, the new building had an austere exterior with impeccable lines that aimed for neutrality and isolation from its surroundings.

In 1973, with the help of his family and Justino de Azcárate, Vaamonde published an account of the work done by the team to protect the Spanish artistic heritage during the civil war. In 1976 he published an article on the same subject, Objetivo: Museo del Prado, in the review Historia in Madrid. Vaamonde died in Caracas, Venezuela, on 3 October 1986.

== Publications ==
Publications include:

- José Lino Vaamonde Valencia (1973), Salvamento y Protección del Tesoro Artístico Español durante la guerra 1936–1939 (in Spanish), Caracas: imprenta Cromotip

== Sources ==
- Donación Joselino Vaamonde Horcada (PDF) (in Spanish), Ministerio de Educación, Cultura y Deporte
- Genovés Estrada, Isabel (24 June 2015), "El robo y el mercado negro de obras de arte durante la Guerra Civil Española", Los Ojos de Hipatia (in Spanish), ISSN 2341-0612
- González Casas, Lorenzo; Vicente Garrido, Henry (2010), Mundos que se desvanecen: el exilio arquitectónico español en Venezuela. (in Spanish), Universidade de Santiago de Compostela, Centro Interdisciplinario de Estudios Americanistas
- Lacruz, Francisco Agramunt (2017-02-28), "Jesús Martí Martín (1899–1975)", Arte en las alambradas: Artistas españoles en campos de concentración, exterminio y gulags (in Spanish), Universitat de València, ISBN 978-84-9134-047-8
- Négri, Vincent (2014-03-07), Le patrimoine culturel, cible des conflits armés: De la guerre civil espagnole aux guerres du 21è siècle (in French), Bruylant, ISBN 978-2-8027-3942-5
- Núñez Izquierdo, Sara (2014-08-01), El arquitecto Francisco Gil González (1905-1962) y la arquitectura salmantina del segundo tercio del siglo XX (in Spanish), Ediciones Universidad de Salamanca, ISBN 978-84-9012-471-0
- Redondo Abal, Francisco Xavier (23 December 2015), Notas sobre os irmáns de Teresa Vaamonde Valencia (PDF) (in Galician), Consello da Cultura Galeca
- Vicente Garrido, Henry (February 2011), "De Venezuela: La ficticia "ilusión" del destierro", Arquitextos (in Spanish), Vitruvius, ISSN 1809-6298
