= Manuel Sánchez Arcas =

Spanish Modernist architect

- Sánchez Arcas in Moscow in 1945
- Born: 1897; Madrid, Spain
- Died: 1970 (aged 72–73); Berlin, Germany
- Occupations: Architect and urban planner

Manuel Sánchez Arcas (1897–1970) was a Spanish Modernist architect. During the Spanish Civil War (1936–1939) he served in the Republican government as Undersecretary for Propaganda. After the Republican defeat he went into exile in Moscow, Warsaw and Berlin.

== Life ==
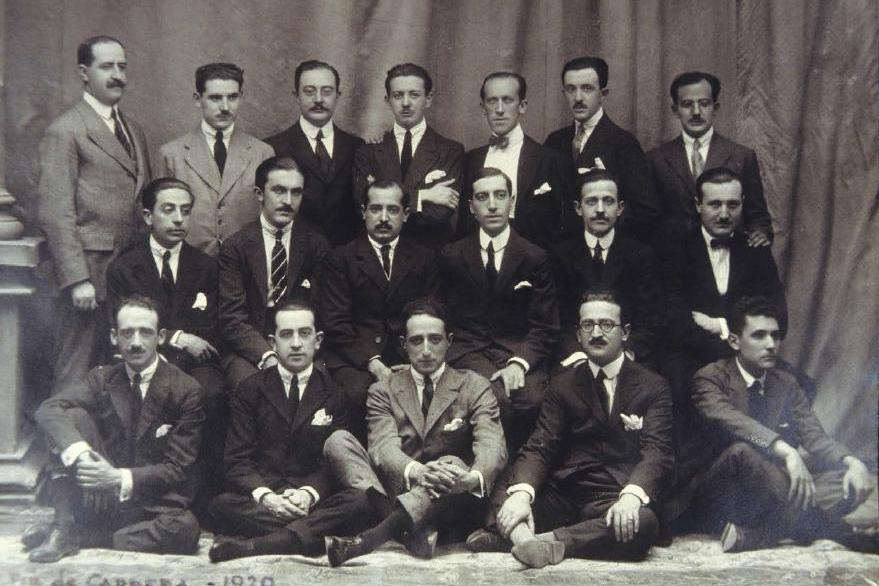
with graduation colleagues, 1920

=== Early years: 1897–1936 ===
Manuel Sánchez Arcas was born in Madrid in 1897. He studied at the Madrid School of Architecture (Escuela de Arquitectura de Madrid), and graduated in 1921. He went to London for further studies. On his return to Spain he first worked with Secundino Zuazo, then from 1925 worked alone. He was one of the architects known as the "1925 generation" that tried to introduce avant-garde Modernist concepts into Spain.

Modesto López Otero was the director for the Madrid University City (Ciudad Universitaria de Madrid) project. He formed a diverse team of young architects to design the various buildings, including Sánchez Arcas. Sánchez Arcas and Jesús Martí Martín designed a new building for the Center for Historical Studies. The engineer Eduardo Torroja joined the group in 1929. He worked with Sánchez Arcas, sharing his interest in new architectural forms that rejected preconceived formulas. The first collaborative work of Torroja and Sanchez Arcas was the pavilion of the Construction Commission of the university city, completed in June 1931. They worked on the heating plant (Central Térmica) and the clinical hospital for the university city. Sánchez Arcas and Torroja designed an enclosed and semi-spherical shell for the 1932 Algeciras market hall. The 9 centimetres (3.5 in) thick concrete roof was 47.5 metres (156 ft) high, vaulted, supported on eight pillars. As an engineering work it is considered Torroja's masterpiece.

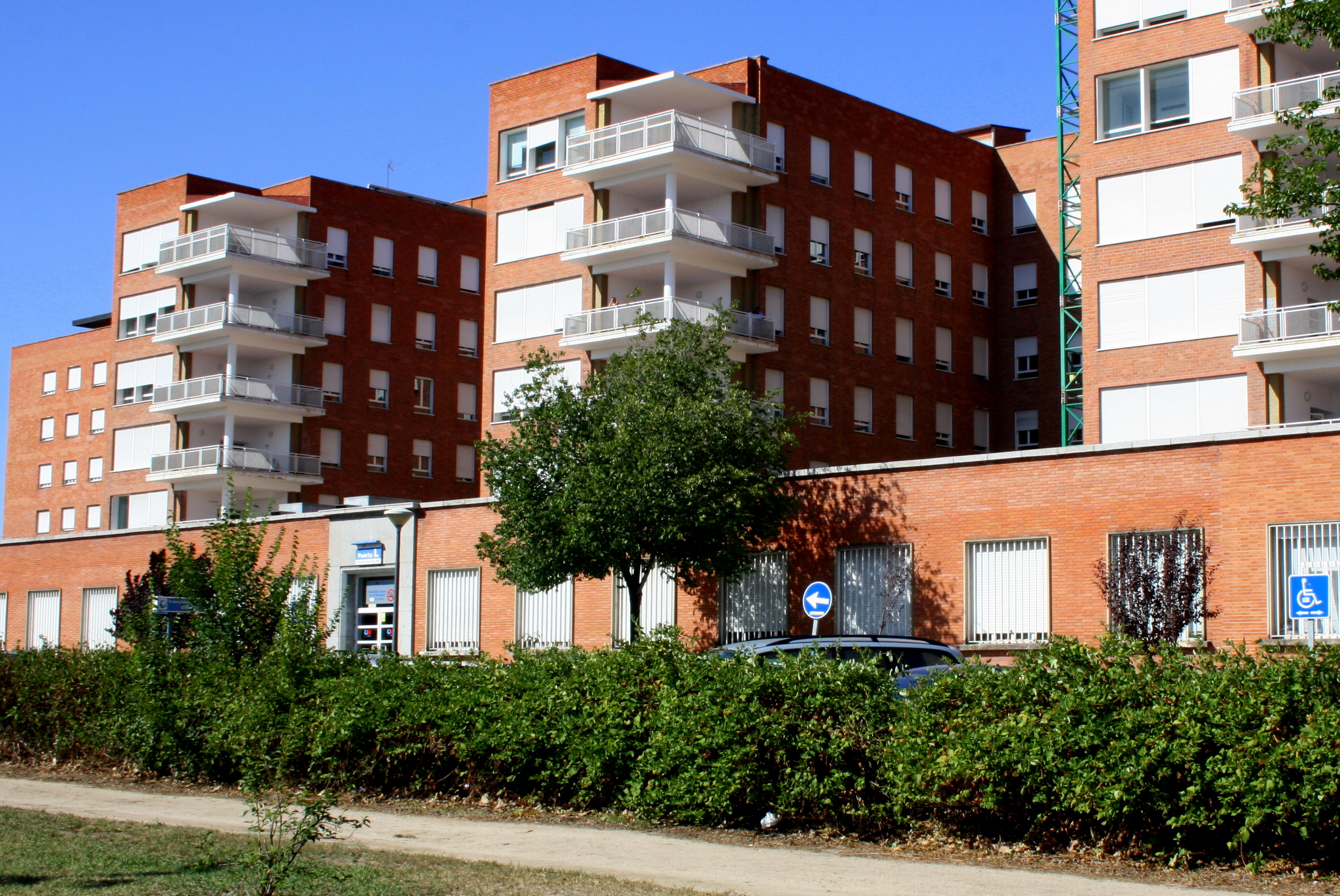
Clinical Hospital San Carlos de Madrid

Sánchez Arcas and Torroja founded the journal Hormigón y Acero (Concrete and Steel). In 1934 they founded the Instituto Técnico de la Construcción y Edificación (ITCE, Technical Institute of Construction and Building). Other founding members were the architect Modesto López Otero (1885–1962) and the engineers José María Aguirre Gonzalo (1897–1988) and Alfonso Peña Boeuf (1888–1966). The ITCE was a non-profit organization dedicated to developing and applying technical innovations in engineering civil structures.

=== Civil War: 1936–1939 ===
Sánchez Arcas became a dedicated member of the Spanish Communist Party (PCE). The Spanish Civil War began in July 1936 with the rebellion of Nationalists led by Francisco Franco. With the approach of Nationalist troops to Madrid in early November 1936 the government of Prime Minister Francisco Largo Caballero was restructured to include the anarchists Joan Peiró (Industry), Juan López Sánchez (Commerce) and Federica Montseny (Health). Carlos Esplá became the first Minister of Propaganda of Spain, with Sánchez Arcas as undersecretary.

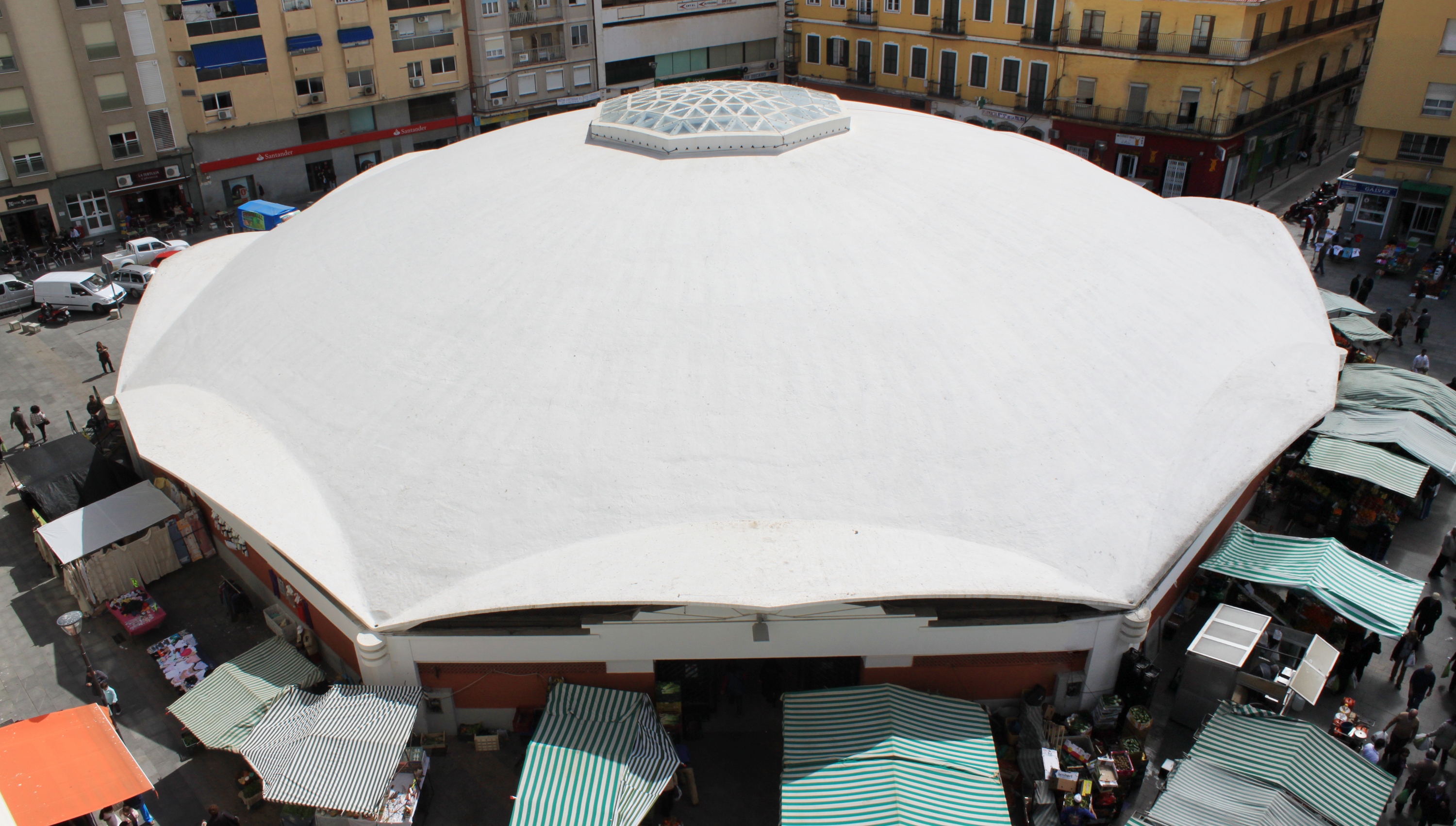
Ingeniero Torroja Market, Algeciras

When Juan Negrín formed his first government he eliminated the Ministry of Propaganda, making it a sub-secretariat under the Ministry of State. Esplá remained in charge of propaganda. Later, Sánchez Arcas was appointed undersecretary of propaganda on 22 January 1938 by José Giral, Minister of Foreign Affairs. He replaced the communist Federico Melchor. When Negrín formed his new cabinet on 5 April 1938 he made Julio Álvarez del Vayo the Foreign Minister. Alvarez del Vayo in turn made Sánchez Arcas head of the Propaganda Subsecretería. In May 1938 he confirmed Ramos Oliveira as head of the Press Office in the Spanish Embassy in London. With a serious shortage of foreign currency, Sánchez Arcas took measures to centralize control of the sub secretariat and to reduce costs. He dissolved the Servicio Espaňol de Información and personally took charge of correspondence with foreign representatives. Later he delegated this task to Miguel González, his Head of Publications. He also proposed to sell books and pamphlets published abroad at a price sufficient to cover costs.

In March 1939 the Republican government faced a rebellion led by Segismundo Casado. Prime Minister Juan Negrín and the communist leaders Dolores Ibárruri, Juan Modesto, Enrique Líster and Vicente Uribe flew out of Spain from Monòver airfield in the morning of 6 March 1939. Sánchez Arcas accompanied Negrín.

=== Exile:1939–1970 ===
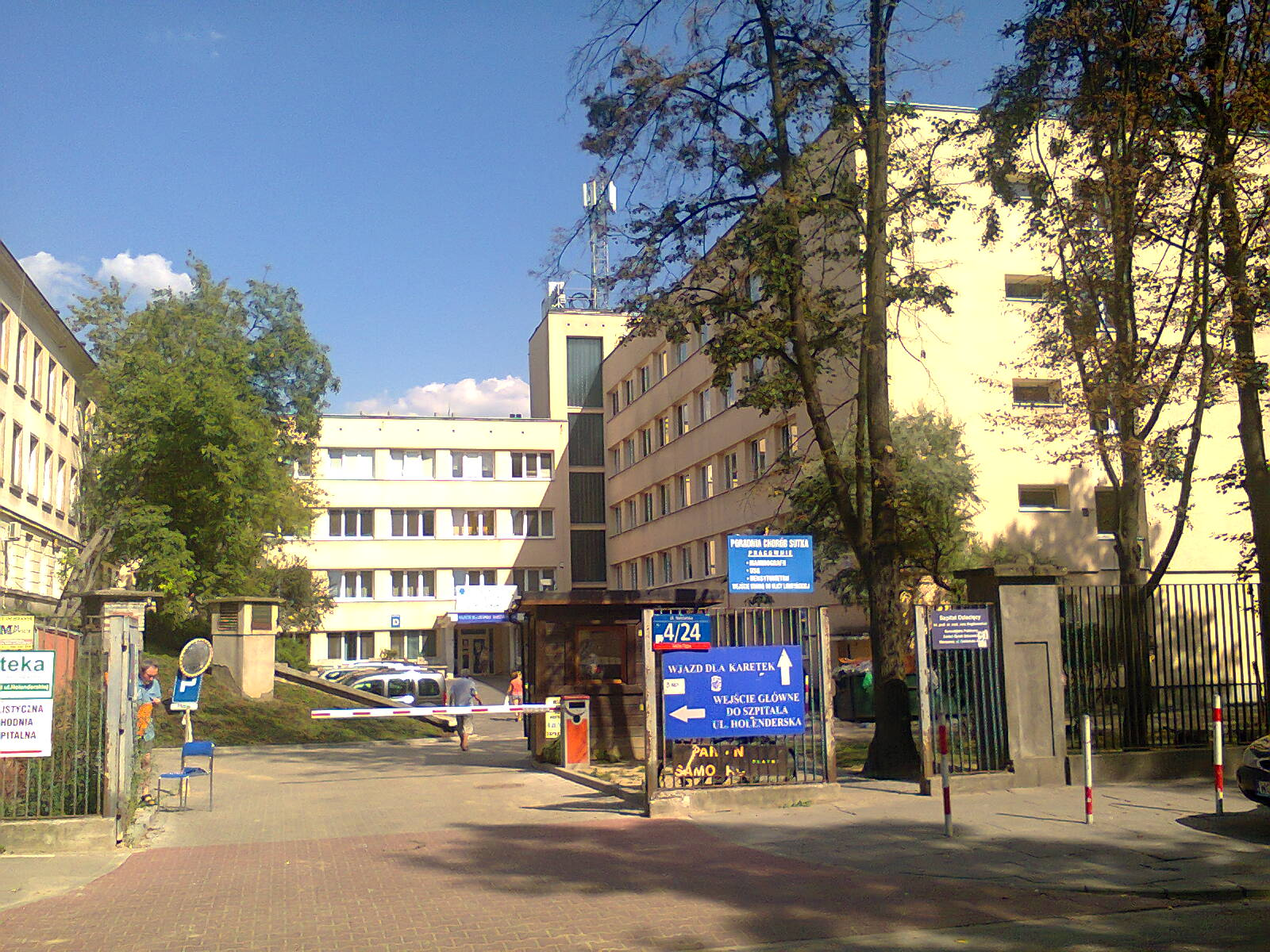
Niekłańska Street in Warsaw - Children's Hospital

Sánchez Arcas went into exile in Russia. He was appointed Minister in Warsaw by the exiled Spanish Republican government in 1946. His reports to the exiled government in Paris were closely aligned with Stalinist propaganda; he was among the Spanish delegates to the World Congress of Peace in 1949. In February 1950, upon firm suggestions from PCE and Uribe personally, he resigned as Spanish representative in Poland; in letters to the prime minister Martínez Barrio he lambasted friendly relations of the exile government with "Tito y su familia fascista".

Following resignation Sánchez Arcas remained in Warsaw with his wife and daughters and resumed work as an architect; his chief work was design of the pediatric hospital, operational under today and known as "szpital na Niekłańskiej". Counted among "distinguished fighters" for the cause of peace and justice, he was receiving financial support, unknown whether formally as a pension or otherwise. In 1954 he was elected a member of the Central Committee of the PCE at the 5th Congress held in Prague.

Around 1956 (exact date unclear) Sánchez Arcas moved to East Berlin, reportedly "a la orden de su partido". A contemporary scholar speculates that he left Poland following some liberalization in the aftermath of Stalin's death; the continuously hardline regime of German Democratic Republic might have appealed more to the Spanish Communist orthodoxes. In the 1960s in East Germany he published a few books on architecture, yet it is not clear whether he designed any construction actually completed. During his last years he approached the Francoist authorities negotiating his return to Madrid, but eventually he resided in DDR until death in 1970.

== Buildings ==
- 1931 Hospital Provincial de Toledo, Toledo, Spain
- 1932 Edificio Rockefeller, Madrid, Spain (with Luis Lacasa)
- 1932 Central Térmica, Madrid, Spain (with Eduardo Torroja)
- 1935 Mercado de Algeciras, Algeciras, Spain (with Eduardo Torroja)
- 1928–36 Hospital Clinico San Carlos de Madrid (with Eduardo Torroja)
- 1951-54 Szpital Pediatryczny Niekłańska, Warsaw

== Publications ==
- Casos prácticos de estudio de iluminación natural. Instituto Técnico de la Construcción y Edificación. Madrid 193?
- Form und Bauweise der Schalen Berlín: VEB Verlag für Bauwesen, 1961
- Stadt und Verkehr: Verkehrs- und Stadtplanung in den USA und in Westeuropa. Berlín: Deutsche Bauakademie, 1968
- Stadtzentren. Beiträgezur Ungestaltung und Neuplanung. Berlín: Deutsche Bauakademie, 1967, (collective publication)

== Sources ==
- Adriaenssens, Sigrid; Block, Philippe; Veenendaal, Diederik; Williams, Chris (2014-03-21). Shell Structures for Architecture: Form Finding and Optimization. Routledge. ISBN 978-1-317-90938-5.
- Alba, Víctor (1983-01-01). The Communist Party in Spain. Transaction Publishers. ISBN 978-1-4128-1999-2.
- Antuña Bernardo, Joaquín (2003). "Manuel Sánchez Arcas (1897-1970) y Eduardo Torreja Miret (1899-1961)" (PDF). Colección Arquíthemas (in Spanish) (12). fundación caja de arquitectos.
- Bolloten, Burnett (1991). The Spanish Civil War: Revolution and Counterrevolution. Univ of North Carolina Press. ISBN 978-0-8078-1906-7.
- Camprubí, Lino (2014-05-02). Engineers and the Making of the Francoist Regime. MIT Press. ISBN 978-0-262-02717-5.
- Ciechanowski, Jan Stanisław (2007). "Las relaciones entre la Polonia comunista y la República española en el exilio. Razones políticas de la misión de Manuel Sánchez Arcas en Varsovia (1946-1950)". Ayer (in Spanish) (67, Las relaciones de España con Europa centro-oriental (1939-1975)). Asociacion de Historia Contemporanea and Marcial Pons Ediciones de Historia. JSTOR 41325174.
- Egido León, Ángeles (2001). "Comentario de Libros: Sueño y pesadilla del republicanismo español. Carlos Esplá: una biografía política.- Angosto Vélez" (in Spanish). Archived from the original on October 23, 2004.
- García, Hugo (2010). The Truth about Spain!: Mobilizing British Public Opinion, 1936-1939. Sussex Academic Press. ISBN 978-1-84519-332-4.
- Hart-Davis, Adam (2012-04-16). "Eduardo Torroja". Engineers. DK Publishing. ISBN 978-1-4654-0682-8.
- Lacruz, Francisco Agramunt (2017-02-28), "Jesús Martí Martín (1899–1975)", Arte en las alambradas: Artistas españoles en campos de concentración, exterminio y gulags (in Spanish), Universitat de València, ISBN 978-84-9134-047-8
- Lapunzina, Alejandro (2005-01-01). Architecture of Spain. Greenwood Publishing Group. ISBN 978-0-313-31963-1.
- "Manuel Sánchez Arcas". epdlp.
- Thomas, Hugh (2013-11-06). The Spanish Civil War: Revised Edition. Random House Publishing Group. ISBN 978-0-8041-5216-7.
