= La Unión y el Fénix Español building =

- Edificio La Unión y el Fénix Español
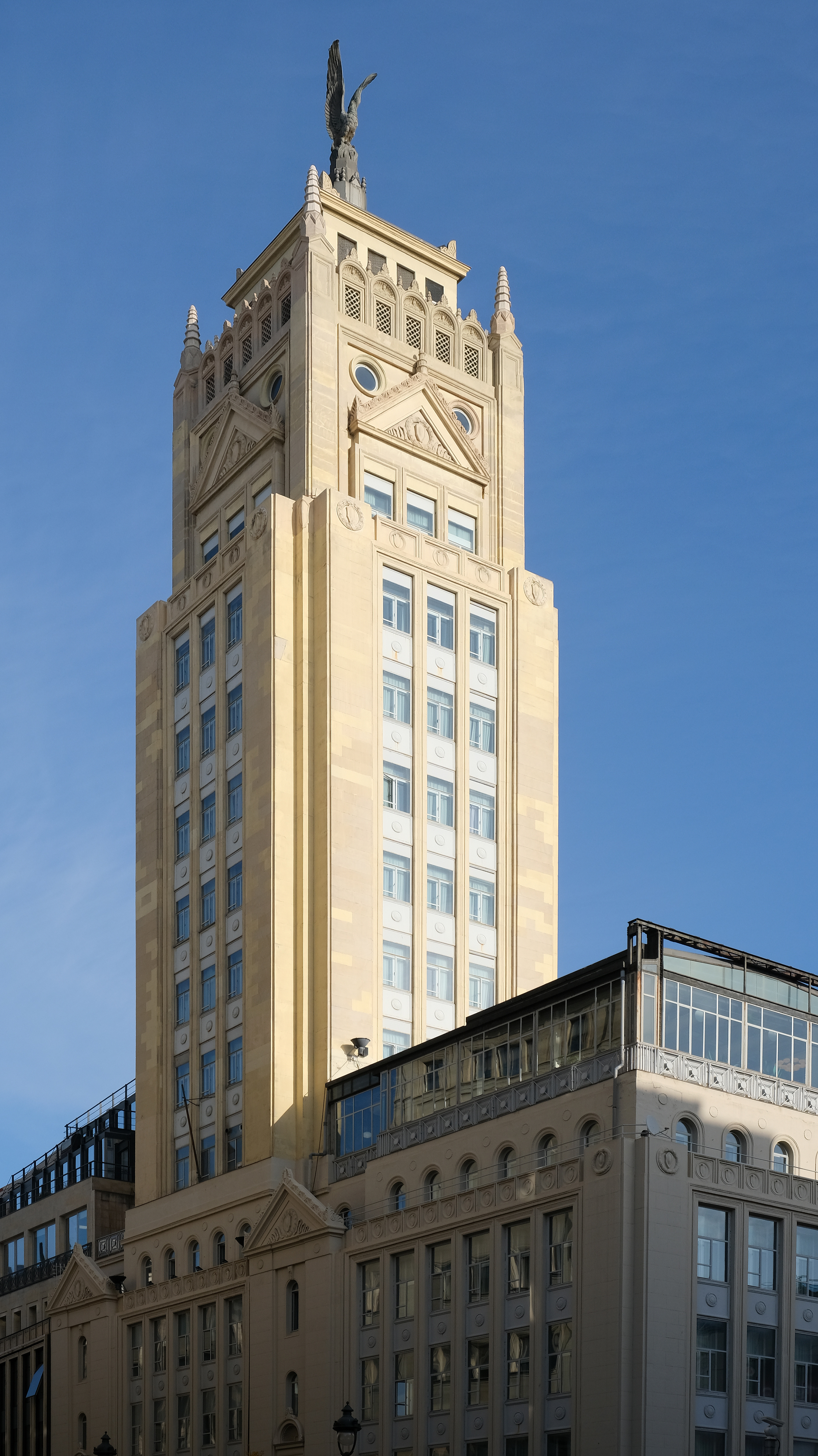
- Interactive map of the La Unión y el Fénix Español building area

General information
- Location: Madrid, Spain
- Coordinates: 40°25′5.77″N 3°41′57.56″W
- Construction started: 1928
- Completed: 1931

Height
- Height: 53 m (174 ft)

Design and construction
- Architect: Modesto López Otero

The La Unión y el Fénix Español building, destined to be the headquarters of the former insurance company "La Unión y el Fénix Español", was one of the first skyscrapers in Madrid. Since 2006 it has housed the "Petit Palace Alcalá Torre" hotel, which belongs to a hi-tech company.

It is located on the corner of Alcalá street and Virgen de los Peligros street. It was built between 1928 and 1931, based on the project of the Spanish architect Modesto López Otero, with the collaboration of Miguel de los Santos. Valentín Vallhonrat company carried the works out. The authorship of the sculpture that pinnacles the building refers to «sculptor Camps», whose identity is doubtful, it is unknown whether it is related to Vicente Camps Bru or Josep Maria Camps i Arnau. The building site was acquired for two millions of pesetas in 1928. One of the keys of the project was the integration of the new skyscraper in a harmonic way with the adjacent church of Las Calatravas, both have shaped an urban entity. It is one of the more notorious works of López Otero and its design involves an evolution from López Otero's "regionalist eclecticism" of his first works to a more «mature» style, after traveling to United States or Vienna.

A 12-story skyscraper, it has a roof height of 173 feet (53 m). The nearest Metro station is Sevilla, on line 2.

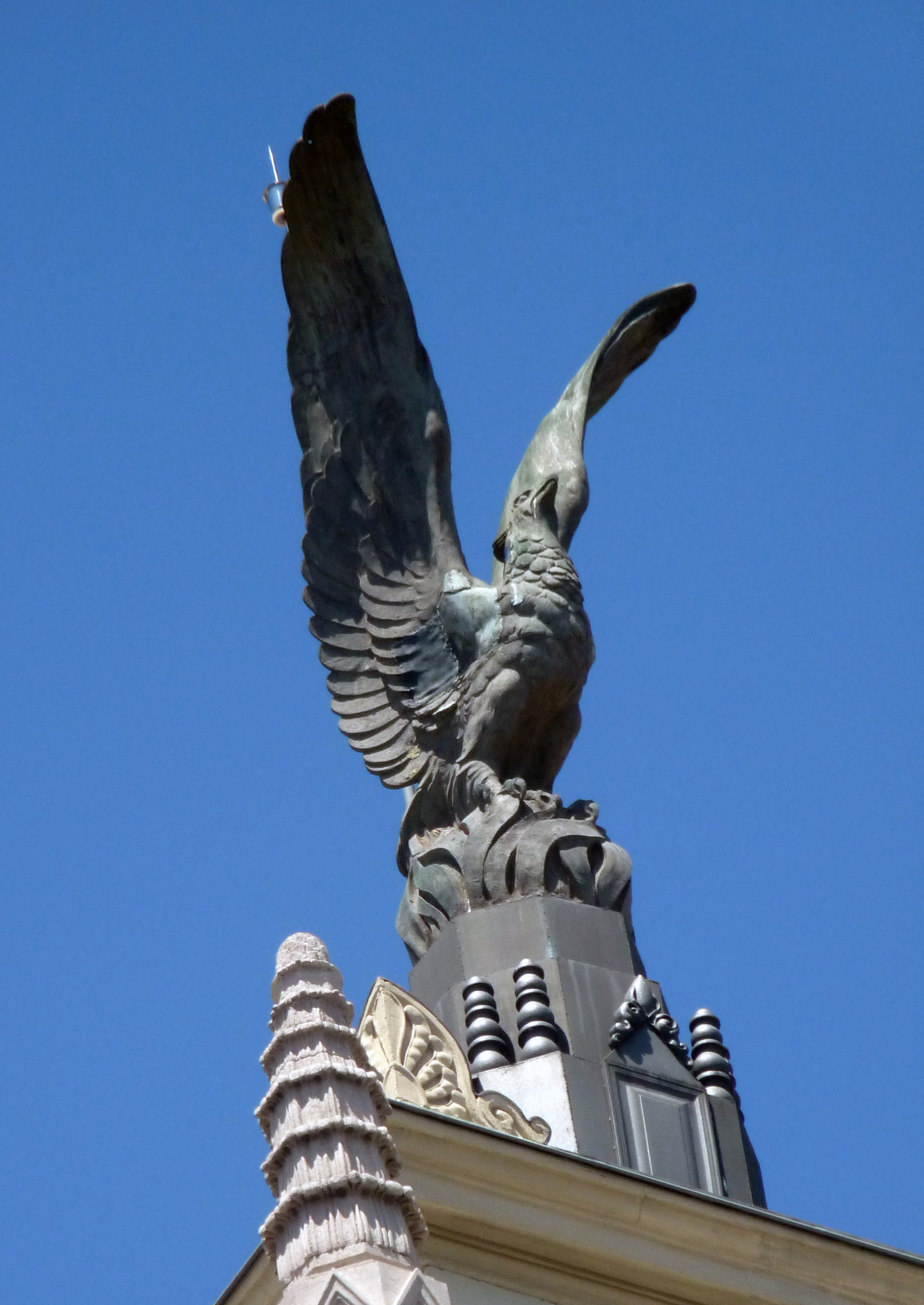
Phoenix bird on the top of the building.

== Bibliography ==
- Giménez Serrano, Carmen (2002). "La empresa en la ciudad: Compañías de seguros en Madrid" (PDF). Revista empresa y humanismo (in Spanish). 5 (1): 77–94. ISSN 1139-7608. Archived from the original (PDF) on 2014-02-02.
- López Díaz, Jesús (2009). "La Gran Vía y la arquitectura española contemporánea" (PDF). Espacio, Tiempo y Forma (in Spanish) (22–23): 303–320. ISSN 1130-4715.
