= San Patricio Bridge =

Aqueduct bridge in Spain

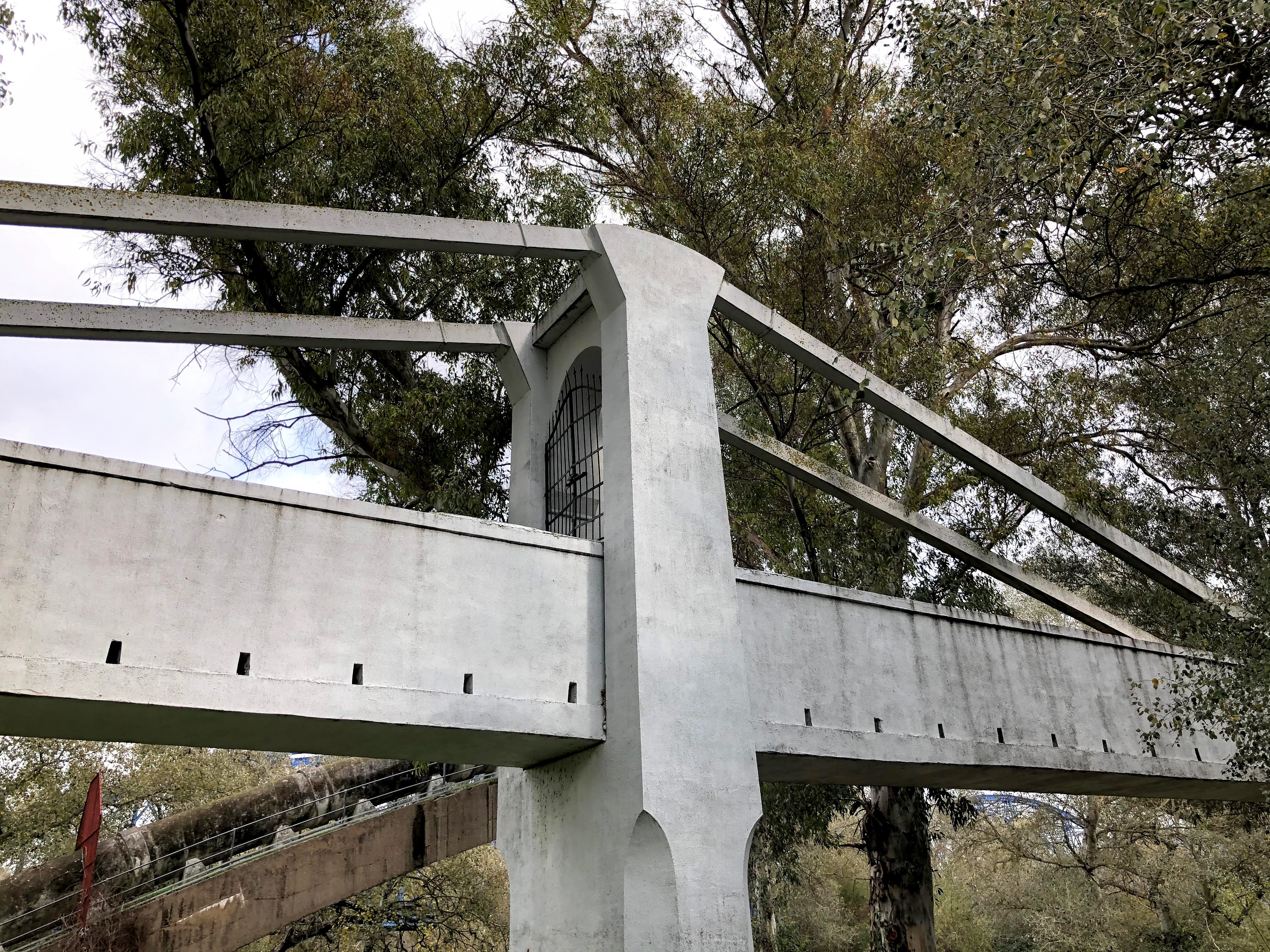
- Coordinates: 36°38′55″N 5°55′50″W
- Locale: La Barca de la Florida, Spain

San Patricio bridge (usually referred to as the Tempul aqueduct bridge or the La Barca aqueduct) is a bridge which supports the Tempul aqueduct as it passes over the River Guadalete, near the town of La Barca de la Florida, in the municipality of Jerez de la Frontera in Spain. Designed in 1925 by the engineer Eduardo Torroja and built under the direction of the engineer Francisco Ruiz Martínez, is considered one of the first exponents of the use of prestressed concrete in Spain. At the time of its construction it became the cable-stayed bridge with the largest span in the world, with 57 metres.

== History ==
For the passage, a structure of 14 piles is designed,4 with biapoyada lights of 30 meters. Two of these piers were set in the riverbed, so it was doubtful whether the structure could withstand the river's embankments in the event of flooding. This is why Eduardo Torroja, the person in charge of designing the work, decided to replace the two pillars with a central span with two 20-metre brackets and a central 17-metre section. To support the corbels, 63-mm diameter steel braces are extended, which rest on the pilasters. To tension the cable, the upper section of the pilaster was raised with jacks, causing the vertical reaction necessary to put the braces in tension and leave the bridge in a loaded condition. Torroja himself says that shortly after the structure was concreted, water began to rise in the riverbed, threatening the integrity of the structure. When it was considered that the concrete had reached sufficient resistance, the jacks were activated, raising the structure about 25 cm and raising the span by 5 cm. The formwork would eventually be washed away by the water, but the bridge could be completed in time. The bridge was completed in January 1927.
