= José María Aguirre Gonzalo =

Basque civil engineer, businessman and banker

- Born: 12 August 1897; San Sebastián, Spain
- Died: 7 April 1988 (aged 90); Madrid, Spain
- Occupations: Civil engineer, businessman

José María Aguirre Gonzalo (12 August 1897 – 7 April 1988) was a Basque civil engineer, businessman and banker. He played a leading role in the development of the Spanish economy during the reign of Caudillo Francisco Franco that followed the Spanish Civil War (1936–39).

== Early years (1897–1927) ==
José María Aguirre Gonzalo was born in San Sebastián on 12 August 1897. He studied Civil Engineering at the Escuela Técnica Superior (Higher Technical School) in Madrid. He graduated in 1921. He would later teach accounting and business organization at this school. He then took some courses in Law. He began work with the Otamendi brothers on the Madrid Metro, which by 1919 had opened almost 4 kilometres (2.5 mi) between the Sol and Cuatro Caminos stations.

== Pre-war years (1927–39) ==
In 1927 Aguirre and his friend Alejandro San Román founded the Agromán construction company. Aguirre was chairman, managing director and then honorary chairman of this company. In its early years Agromán obtained major contracts in public works and buildings, and was involved in some important projects in the 1930s including the University City of Madrid (Ciudad Universitaria de Madrid) and the Castellana rail link. In 1934 Manuel Sánchez Arcas (1897–1970) and Eduardo Torroja (1899–1961) founded the Instituto Técnico de la Construcción y Edificación (ITCE, Technical Institute of Construction and Building). Other founding members were Aguirre Gonzalo, the architect Modesto López Otero (1885–1962) and the engineer Alfonso Peña Boeuf (1888–1966). The ITCE was a non-profit organization dedicated to developing and applying technical innovations in engineering civil structures.

During the Second Spanish Republic Aguirre had difficulties with the authorities and was imprisoned.

== Post-war career (1939–88) ==
After the Spanish Civil War (1936–39) Agromán, with Dragados, became the leading construction company in Spain. Aguirre played a central role in the economic development of the country, and founded or promoted major companies in a range of business sectors. He was an adviser to the Renfe railway company and the Compañía Sevillana de Electricidad, and president of the Ribagorzana hydroelectric company, Acerinox steel company and Siemens España engineering company. He was also a director and shareholder of the newspapers El Diario Vasco and Informaciones. He became president or member of the board of over fifty companies, and was one of the most visible and influential businessmen of the time. In common with other business leaders of the time, he had an authoritarian style and little interest in human relations concepts.

Aguirre was a procurador in Francisco Franco's Cortes from 1961 to 1976, first as a representative of the Association of Civil Engineers, and then as a direct appointee by Franco. Aguirre denied having any political ambition, despite his seat in parliament, and turned down an offer by Franco to become Minister of Housing. He chaired the transport committee of the Spanish Plan for Economic and Social Development, and was a member of the national economic council. In the 1970s Franco named him vice-president of the highly political Fundamental Laws commission. Aguirre was also a member of various international organizations including the European Concrete Committee, the Spanish committee of the World Energy Council and the European Cultural Foundation.

Aguirre was involved in banking from 1941. He became chairman of the Banco Guipuzcoano in 1956, and held this position until his death in April 1988, when he was replaced by his son, also named José María Aguirre González, who had been a director of the bank for five years. He was also chairman of the Banco de Desarrollo Económico y Social (Bank of Economic and Social Development). He was director and then vice-president of the Banco Español de Crédito (Banesto). He was appointed chairman of this bank in September 1970. Immediately after becoming chairman he initiated weekly luncheon meetings of the heads of the seven major banks. Monetary authorities were also invited to attend. By the 1980s the major banks in Spain were short of capital. Aguirre believed in specialization and opposed rationalization of the industry through mergers and acquisitions. He resigned from Banesto in 1983.

Aguirre participated in creation of the Colegio de Ingenieros de Caminos (College of Civil Engineers), of which he was the first president, and the Colegio Universitario de Estudios Financieros (University College of Financial Studies) (CUNEF). He died of a heart attack on 7 April 1988 in the Clínica Ruber in Madrid at the age of 90.

== Sources ==
- Baleren Bakaikoa (2009). "José María Aguirre Gonzalo". Auñamendi Eusko Entziklopedia (in Spanish). Eusko Ikaskuntzaren Euskomedia Fundazioa. ISSN 2444-5487.
- Cabrera, Mercedes; Reguillo, Fernando del Rey (2007). The Power of Entrepreneurs: Politics and Economy in Contemporary Spain. Berghahn Books. ISBN 978-1-84545-185-1.
- Camprubí, Lino (2014-05-02). Engineers and the Making of the Francoist Regime. MIT Press. ISBN 978-0-262-02717-5.
- Guillén, Mauro F. (1994-10-15). Models of Management: Work, Authority, and Organization in a Comparative Perspective. University of Chicago Press. p. 202. ISBN 978-0-226-31036-7.
- J. F. (2010-06-26). "Un banco centenario con raíces vascas". El Diario Vasco. San Sebastiánlanguage=Spanish.
- "José María Aguirre Gonzalo". Biografías y Vidas (in Spanish).
- Lamata, JF (1970-09-19). "El procurador franquista Aguirre Gonzalo nombrado nuevo Presidente del Banco Español del Crédito (Banco Banesto)". Le hemeroteca del Buitre (in Spanish).
- "Manuel Sánchez Arcas". epdlp (in Spanish).
- Sánchez Calvo, Isabel (2015). "Aguirre Gonzalo, José María (1897-1988)". mcnbiografias.com (in Spanish).
- Tortella, Gabriel; García Ruiz, José Luis (2013-10-23). Spanish Money and Banking: A History. Palgrave Macmillan. ISBN 978-1-137-31713-1.
