= Alfonso Peña Boeuf =

Spanish politician

Minister of Public Works
- In office 30 January 1938 – 18 July 1945
- Succeeded by: José María Fernández-Ladreda

Personal details
- Born: 23 January 1888 Madrid, Spain
- Died: 1 February 1966 (aged 78) Madrid, Spain
- Occupation: Civil Engineer

Alfonso Peña Boeuf (23 January 1888 – 1 February 1966) was a Spanish civil engineer and administrator. He was Minister of Public Works from 1938 to 1945 in the government of General Francisco Franco. He did much to reconstruct the roads and railways that had been devastated during the Spanish Civil War (1936–39) and launched a massive hydrological program for electricity and irrigation.

== Early career ==
Alfonso Peña Boeuf was born on 23 January 1888 in Madrid. He worked as a highway engineer before the Spanish Civil War (1936–39), and wrote several technical books. He became a professor at the Escuela de Ingenieros de Caminos, Canales y Puertos (School of Engineering of Roads, Canals and Ports). In December 1933 he was elected to the Royal Academy of Sciences (Real Academia de Ciencias), where he delivered a talk in June 1934 on The Resonance of Structures.

In 1934 Manuel Sánchez Arcas and Eduardo Torroja founded the Instituto Técnico de la Construcción y Edificación (ITCE, Technical Institute of Construction and Building). Other founding members were the architect Modesto López Otero (1885–1962) and the engineers José María Aguirre Gonzalo (1897–1988) and Alfonso Peña Boeuf. The ITCE was a non-profit organization dedicated to developing and applying technical innovations in engineering civil structures.

Peña Boeuf became highly respected as a civil engineer. In October 1937 Franco asked him to prepare a General Plan for Public Works, much of which would be concerned with hydraulic projects. The proposed framework was similar to the 1933 National Hydrological Plan, but placed more emphasis on national control to support self-sufficient development. In his 1940 Plan of Public Works Peña Boeuf noted of the 1933 hydrological plan that, "Its fundamental and foundational work will be very useful, and we believe that this must continue and be updated and amended if required."

== Minister of Public Works ==
General Francisco Franco appointed Peña Boeuf Minister of Public Works towards the end of the Civil War. He held this portfolio for three more cabinets. He was Minister of Public Works from 30 January 1938 to 18 July 1945, and was a National Councillor in the Cortes for the first eight legislatures. He was sympathetic to the former monarchy, but saw himself as a "technician" rather a politician. Peña Boeuf devoted most of his energy to rebuilding the roads and railways that had been destroyed during the war. He and Ramón Serrano Suñer were the only two ministers to remain in office when Franco overhauled his cabinet in August 1939. Franco tightened his control while presenting a fascist image that would be acceptable to Hitler and Mussolini, whom he assumed would win the European war that was about to start.

Peña's Public Works plan was officially approved in 1941, including a new law allowing land appropriation for public utilities, and was broadly followed over the years that followed. However, lack of finance prevented full implementation of the promised hydrological revolution. The main objective of the Peña Plan, a massive construction program of dams, reservoirs and canals, was to serve industry with hydroelectricity. It also provided large benefits to agriculture in line with the regime's autarkic policy. 29% of land had been irrigated in 1932. This had risen to 40% by 1965. In 1940 Peña and Gregorio Pérez Conesa, Director General of Railways, inaugurated the section of line from Alcañiz to Tortosa. During Peña's tenure the National Network of Spanish Railways (RENFE, Red Nacional de los Ferrocarriles Españoles) was established in 1941 through which the state consolidated control of the main broad-gauge railway companies and rebuilt infrastructure damaged during the civil war.

== Later career ==
After leaving the ministry in July 1945 Peña Boeuf was made president of RENFE. Peña Boeuf was librarian of the Royal Academy of Sciences from 1939 to 1944 and vice-president from 1944 to 1958. On 11 June 1958 he became president of the Royal Academy of Sciences, holding this position until his death in 1966. In 1971 the Avenida de Alfonso Peña Boeuf in Madrid was named in his memory.

== Publications ==
- Alfonso Peña Boeuf (1945), Discursos y conferencias (in Spanish), p. 244
- Alfonso Peña Boeuf (1954), Memorias de un ingeniero político (in Spanish), Estades: Artes Gráficas, p. 288

== Sources ==
- "Alfonso Peña Boeuf", Biografias y Vidas (in Spanish)
- Alzugaray Aguirre, Juan José (2005-11-30), Penúltimas voluntades (in Spanish), Encuentro, ISBN 978-84-7490-569-4
- Antonio Ortiz Mateos (8 July 2015), "Historia en la memoria: Callejero Franquista (Los héroes que nos libraron del comunismo, vilipendiados por la izquierda)", LaVerdadOfende (in Spanish)
- Camprubí, Lino (2014-05-02). Engineers and the Making of the Francoist Regime. MIT Press. ISBN 978-0-262-02717-5.
- Corkill, Dr David; Harrison, Dr Joseph (2013-06-28), Spain: A Modern European Economy, Ashgate Publishing, Ltd., ISBN 978-1-4094-7951-2
- Juan Peris Torner (2012-03-07), "Puebla de Hijar á Alcañíz, Tortosa y San Carlos de la Rápita (Ferrocarril de Zaragoza al Mediterráneo)", Ferrocarrilesde España (in Spanish), archived from the original on 2016-06-17
- Lewis, Paul H. (2002), Latin Fascist Elites: The Mussolini, Franco, and Salazar Regimes, Greenwood Publishing Group, ISBN 978-0-275-97880-8
- "Manuel Sánchez Arcas". epdlp.
- Swyngedouw, Erik (2015-04-24), Liquid Power: Contested Hydro-Modernities in Twentieth-Century Spain, MIT Press, ISBN 978-0-262-02903-2
