= Manuel Martín Madrid =

Spanish architect

Manuel Martin Madrid is a Spanish architect. He was born in Madrid in 1938. He graduated as an Architect from the Superior Technical School of Architecture of Madrid in 1965 and obtained his PhD in Architecture in 1969. That same year he started the Office of Urbanistic Information (OIC) at the COAC in Girona.

Martin's first major commission was the "Casa Francesc Colomer" in 1968, in Girona, and since then he has carved out a career as an architect influenced by both central European abstract modernism and the Barcelona School. As well as houses, he has designed parks, exhibitions and large-scale developments.

== General references ==
- Manuel Martin Madrid, by Bet Capdeferro. Collegi d'Arquitectes de Catalunya (2006) ISBN 84-961856-3-X (In English, Spanish and Catalán)
