= University City of Madrid =

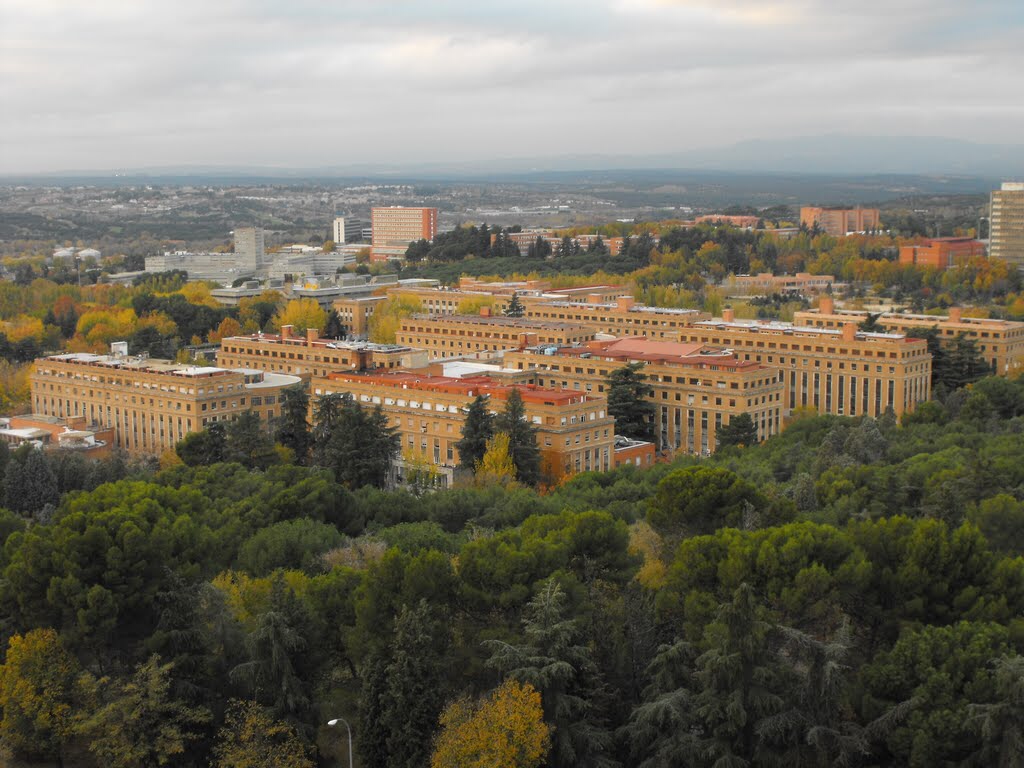
- UCM Faculty of Medicine

Project
- Website: www.campusmoncloa.es

Location
- Campus
- Location within Spain
- Coordinates: 40.443772°N 3.726136°W
- Country: Spain
- City: Madrid
- District: Moncloa-Aravaca

The University City of Madrid (Spanish: Ciudad Universitaria de Madrid), also called the Campus de Moncloa, is a complex in the Moncloa-Aravaca district of Madrid, Spain, that holds buildings of two universities (Complutense University of Madrid and Technical University of Madrid) and several related organizations. The campus was built between 1929 and 1936, when the Spanish Civil War (1936–1939) broke out. It was the scene of much fighting during the Civil War and was badly damaged. The original buildings were repaired or rebuilt after the Civil War and new buildings were added.

== Planning ==
The project to build the Ciudad Universitaria in the northwest of Madrid had its origins in 1911, when a commission was formed to consider building a clinical hospital for Madrid. By the 1920s there were many problems with university education in Madrid. Faculties were scattered throughout the city in outdated buildings. With few exceptions these could not accommodate the needs of disciplines such as Science, Medicine and Architecture for laboratories, studios and so on. King Alfonso XIII of Spain developed the concept of the University City in the summer of 1924. On 17 May 1927 he signed a royal decree that established the Construction Board of the University City of Madrid. The king would preside over the board.

A planning committee was established under the technical supervision of architect Modesto López Otero. He formed a diverse team of young architects to design the various buildings, including Manuel Sánchez Arcas. José Casares Gil, Modesto López Oteri, Julio Palacios and Antonia Simonena were tasked with research of the most respected universities of Europe and North America. After studying several famous universities in Europe, they travelled to North America in November 1927 where they visited Yale, Harvard, M.I.T. and universities in Montreal, Toronto, Michigan, Rochester, Washington, Baltimore, Princeton, and New York City. The University City was planned in 1927–28. A final ideal perspective was created in December 1928. The plan was completed in 1929.

Land owned by the crown in La Moncloa was granted for the site and funding was obtained from the lottery, grants by the king and private donations. The campus covered 320 hectares (790 acres) on a site in the western margin of Madrid, on a plan that drew much from American models. The building designs were influenced by European avant-garde architecture of the period, and the overall layout kept the campus closely integrated with the city of Madrid. The concept was a self-contained urban area including buildings to house the academic faculties, administrative buildings, staff and student residences and sport and leisure facilities. In 1928 design began on the Science and Medical Group complexes.

== Initial development ==
Construction of the University City began in 1929. A committee was formed to oversee the work, the Junta de Construcción de la Ciudad Universitaria de Madrid. The engineer Eduardo Torroja joined the group in 1929. He worked with Sánchez Arcas, sharing his interest in new architectural forms that rejected preconceived formulas. In 1930 the architects Agustín Aguirre and Mariano Garrigues were commissioned to build the Faculty of Pharmacy and Miguel Santos was chosen for the Faculties of Medicine and Dentistry. The first collaborative work of Torroja and Sanchez Arcas was the pavilion of the Construction Commission of the university city, completed in June 1931. They also worked on the heating plant (Central Térmica) and the clinical hospital for the university city.

José María Aguirre Gonzalo and Alejandro San Román had founded the Agromán construction company in 1927. In its early years Agromán obtained major contracts in public works and buildings, and was involved in some important projects in the 1930s including the University City of Madrid.

The majority of the buildings were erected during the Second Spanish Republic, which was founded in 1931. In 1932 the Clinical Hospital was built to the design of Sánchez Arcas and Torroja, and work started on Agustín Aguirre's Faculty of Philosophy and Liberal Arts. In 1933 construction began on the Science Complex and on the School of Architecture under Pascual Bravo. Student Residences designed by Luis Lacasa were built in 1935, after which the outbreak of the Spanish Civil War (1936–1939) brought work to a halt.

== Civil War ==
During the Civil War the University City was the scene of intense fighting during the Battle of Ciudad Universitaria between 15 and 23 November 1936. The Republican militias managed to halt the columns at the command of General Varela and avoid the fall of Madrid into rebel hands. Until then the Francoist troops had been advancing relatively unopposed across Spain, conquering large swathes of territory in a few months. At the Ciudad Universitaria for the first time they encountered fierce opposition. The famous anarchist Buenaventura Durruti died during the fighting on 20 November 1936.

Members of the International Brigades recall building barricades of books. According to the young volunteer John Sommerfield, volumes of Hindu metaphysics and German philosophy of the early nineteenth century in the Philosophy building were "totally bulletproof." Another volunteer recalled that the main weapons were not guns but hand grenades and dynamite. At times the Fascists held one part of a building while the Republicans held another part. After the fascist advance was halted the University City remained divided between the opposing sides for the remainder of the war. The building-by-building, room by room fighting in the Siege of Leningrad has been compared to the struggle for the University City. Most of the buildings were entirely or partially destroyed by bombs.

== Post-war construction ==
A 1940 law formed a new University City Committee, with López Otero and Pedro Muguruza as directing architects. A scale model was made showing the buildings that had been designed and others that were planned for future construction. Work began on the Forestry and Naval Engineering faculties in 1942, and additional buildings were designed and built in the following years. At the start of the 1960s there was a change in philosophy, and rather than attempt unity among the buildings each new structure was designed to be distinctive and unrelated to the others. More land was assigned to the University City, some of it used for research facilities and student dormitories.

Some of the notable architects in the post-war period included Miguel Fisac, José Maria Garcia de Paredes, Rafael de la Hoz, Alfonso D’Escragnolle, Javier Carvajal, García de Paredes, Asís Cabrero, Luis Laorga, José López Zanón, Antonio Fernández Alba, José Luis Fernández del Amo, Horacio Baliero, Carmen Córdova, Fernando Moreno Barberá, Fernando Higueras, Antonio Miró, Alejandro de la Sota, José Antonio López Candeira, Juan de Haro, Jaime López Asiaín and Ángel Días.

The University City as of 2014 had buildings that were built between 1927 and 2003, including most of the schools and faculties of the Complutense University of Madrid and the Technical University of Madrid. It includes more than thirty student residences, and facilities of the Spanish Open University (Universidad Nacional de Educación a Distancia). There are sports centers and a botanical garden. It is also home to research institutions such as the Centro de Investigaciones Energéticas, Medioambientales y Tecnológicas (CIEMAT), Spanish National Research Council (CSIC) and Instituto Nacional de Investigaciones Agrarias y Alimentarias (INIA).

== Sources ==
- Antuña Bernardo, Joaquín (2003). "Manuel Sánchez Arcas (1897-1970) y Eduardo Torreja Miret (1899-1961)" (PDF). Colección Arquíthemas (in Spanish) (12). fundación caja de arquitectos.
- Bell, J. Bowyer (2006-02-01), Besieged: Seven Cities Under Siege, Transaction Publishers, ISBN 978-1-4128-1797-4
- Breve historia (in Spanish), Campus Moncloa
- Caballol, D.; Rodriguez, A.; Diaz, C. (2014-01-31), "Analysis of the Acoustic Performance of Slabs Regarding Airborne Sound and Impact, at the University City of Madrid", Construction and Building Research, Springer Science & Business Media, ISBN 978-94-007-7790-3
- Campos Calvo-Sotelo, Pablo (2006), The Journey of Utopia: The Story of the First American Style Campus in Europe, Nova Publishers, ISBN 978-1-59454-515-3
- Cooke, Linda W. (2007), Frontiers in Higher Education, Nova Publishers, ISBN 978-1-60021-113-3
- "Manuel Sánchez Arcas". epdlp.
- Martínez Reverte, Jorge (2004), La Batalla de Madrid, Barcelona: Crítica
- Nelson, Cary (2002), The Wound and the Dream: Sixty Years of American Poems about the Spanish Civil War, University of Illinois Press, ISBN 978-0-252-07070-9
- Rojo Lluch, Vicente (1967), Así fue la defensa de Madrid: aportación a la historia de la Guerra de España, 1936–1939 (1 ed.), México: Ediciones Era
- Salisbury, Harrison (2009-04-29), The 900 Days: The Siege Of Leningrad, Da Capo Press, Incorporated, ISBN 978-0-7867-3024-7
- Sánchez Calvo, Isabel (2015). "Aguirre Gonzalo, José María (1897-1988)". mcnbiografias.com (in Spanish).
- Sánchez de Lerín García-Ovies (December 2000), Modesto López Otero Vida y Obra (PDF) (Doctoral Thesis), Madrid
- Torres, Marta (9 December 2010), "Recordando a Bernard Knox. Los brigadistas internacionales y la Biblioteca Universitaria, Madrid, 1936", Biblioteca Histórica de la UCM (in Spanish)
- Universidad de Excelencia. Proyecto: Campus de Excelencia Internacional (CEI) (in Spanish), Campus Moncloa
