= Higher Technical School of Architecture of Madrid =

Architecture school of the Technical University of Madrid

- Escuela Técnica Superior de Arquitectura de Madrid
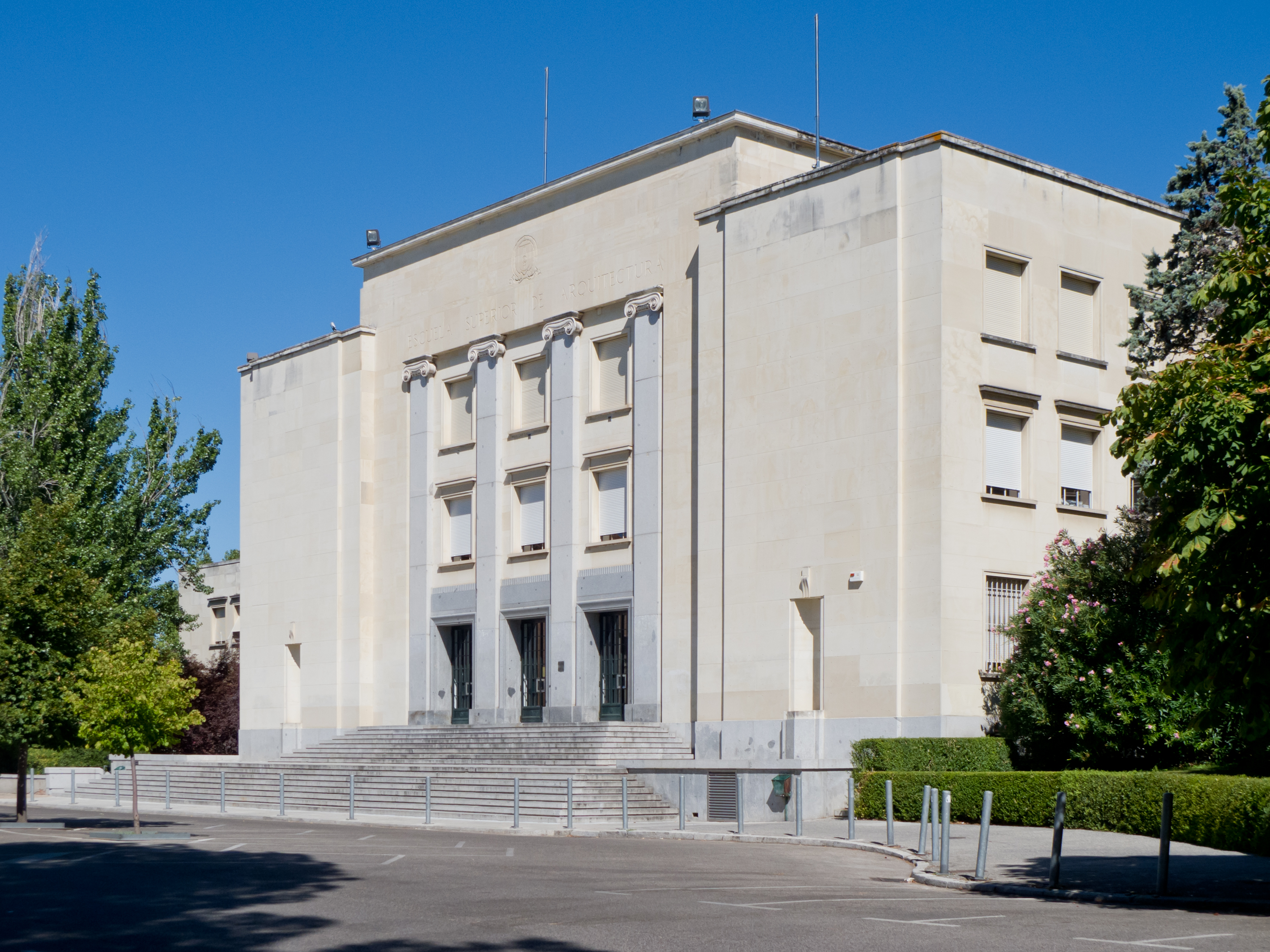
- Other names: ETSAM
- Established: 1844; 182 years ago
- Parent institution: Technical University of Madrid
- Location: Av. de Juan de Herrera, 4, Moncloa - Aravaca, 28040 Madrid, Spain; 40°26′22″N 3°43′52″W

The Higher Technical School of Architecture of Madrid (Spanish: Escuela Técnica Superior de Arquitectura de Madrid, ETSAM) is the school of architecture of the Technical University of Madrid (UPM), Spain. It trains future architects and grants the title of Architect, as well as doctorates and various master's degrees. The center is located on the Avenida Juan de Herrera, 4, within the University City of Madrid. The present building has been used since 1936. It has an extensive library, which includes original works of Le Corbusier, Serlio and Andrés de Vandelvira, the recent architecture journals, and influential books on modern architecture. This school is considered by many industry professionals to be the best in Spain, and one of the best worldwide.

== Study plan ==
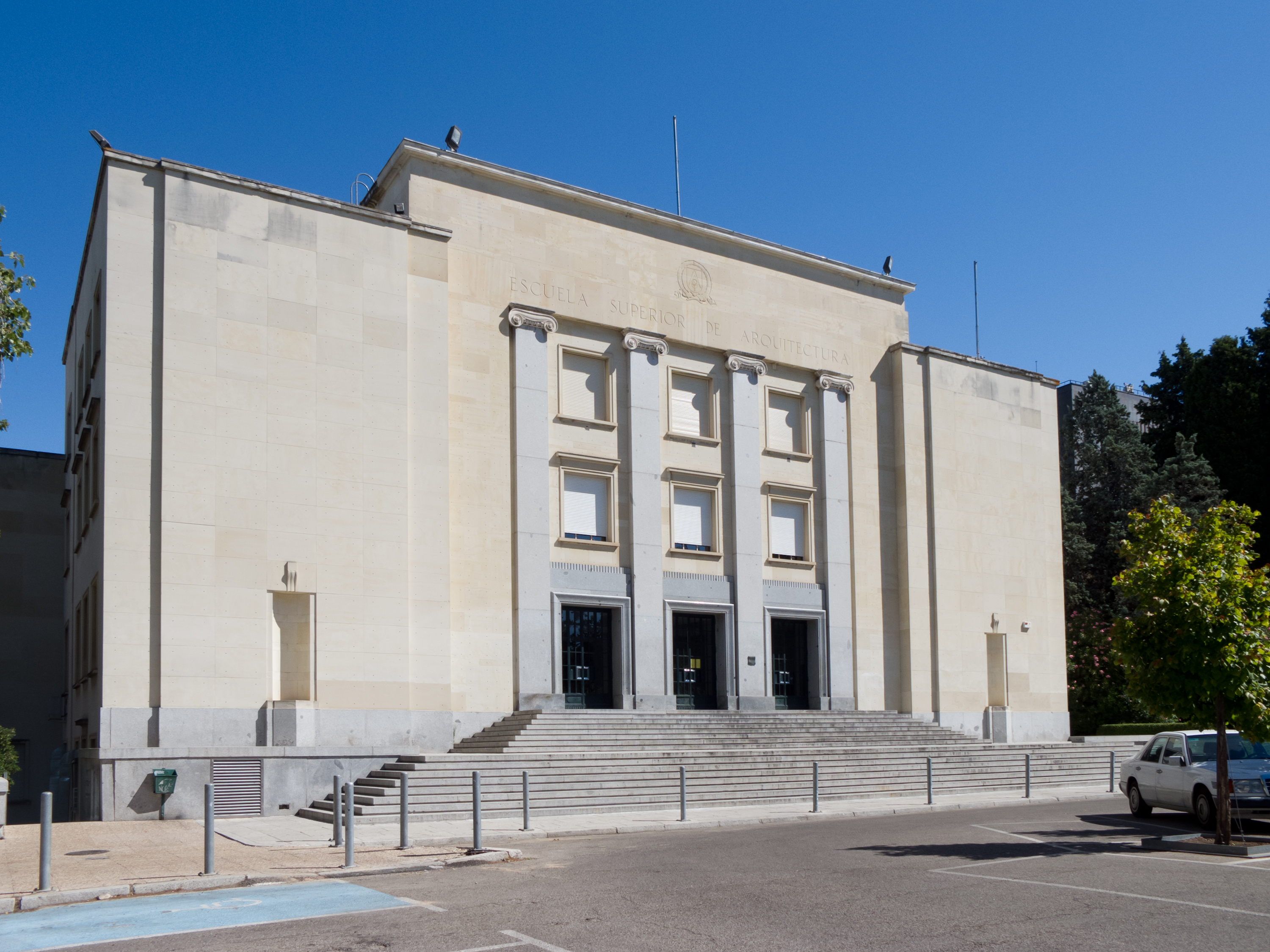
Higher Technical School of Architecture of Madrid

Currently the study plan followed for the main Architecture diploma is Plan 2010, also known as Bolonia. It was passed in 2007, and the old Plan 96 was gradually phased out by June 2018. Plan 2010 consists of 360 ECTS European credits, with an equivalence of between 25 and 30 hours of work per credit, beginning in academic year 2010-2011.

The 360 credits are split into a 300-credit degree and a 60-credit master, a formula known as 5+1 years. The degree is a 5-year study plan, with each year split into two semesters, Fall and Spring. Subjects can be classified as Basic (shared with other faculties in UPM), Compulsory or Optative (exclusively lectured at ETSAM). Only 18 credits correspond to Optative subjects. Once the programme is completed, the student receives a Graduate title in Architecture fundamentals, which opens the way for the one year Master in Architecture, which grants the full title of Architect.

== Postgraduate studies ==
The school offers different postgraduate studies, accessible only to those with the title of Architect. Studies at this level can be PhDs or postgraduate. PhD Studies are organised in programs, each having several subjects that jointly present unity and relationships, and together define a speciality inside the PhD programme.

Postgraduate studies are divided into 9 University masters, 15 specialisation courses and 14 independent titles. Many of them present an international level of prestige and influence, such as the Master in City Sciences and the MCH Master in Collective Housing.

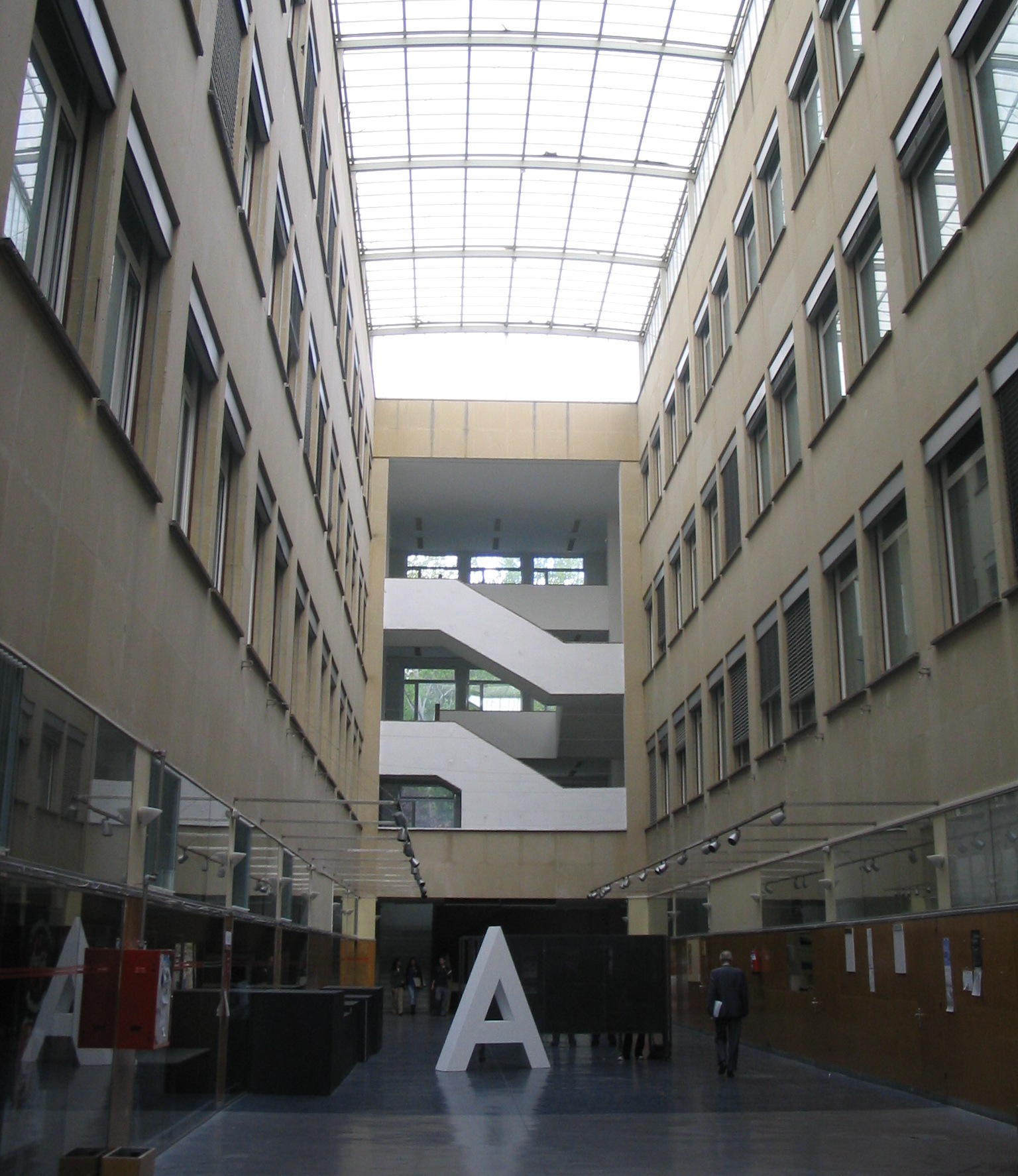
Inside the new building of the ETSAM.

== Notable alumni ==
- Carlos Arroyo (born 1964)
- Mariano Bayón (born 1942)
- Alberto Campo Baeza (born 1946)
- Félix Candela (1910–1997)
- Andrés Jaque (born 1971)
- Rafael Moneo (born 1937)
- Manuel Martín Madrid (born 1938)
- Juan Navarro Baldeweg (born 1939)
- Antonio Palacios (1872–1945)
- Juan Herreros (born 1958)
- Francisco Javier Sáenz de Oiza (1918–2000)
- Manuel Sánchez Arcas (1897–1970)
- Alejandro de la Sota (1913–1996)
- Salvador Valeri i Pupurull (1873–1954)
- Alejandro Zaera-Polo (born 1963)
- Lucia Cano (born 1965)

== See also ==
- Eugenio Fernández Quintanilla
