= Juan Manuel Fanjul =

Spanish politician

The Most Excellent Juan Manuel Fanjul Sedeño OSRP
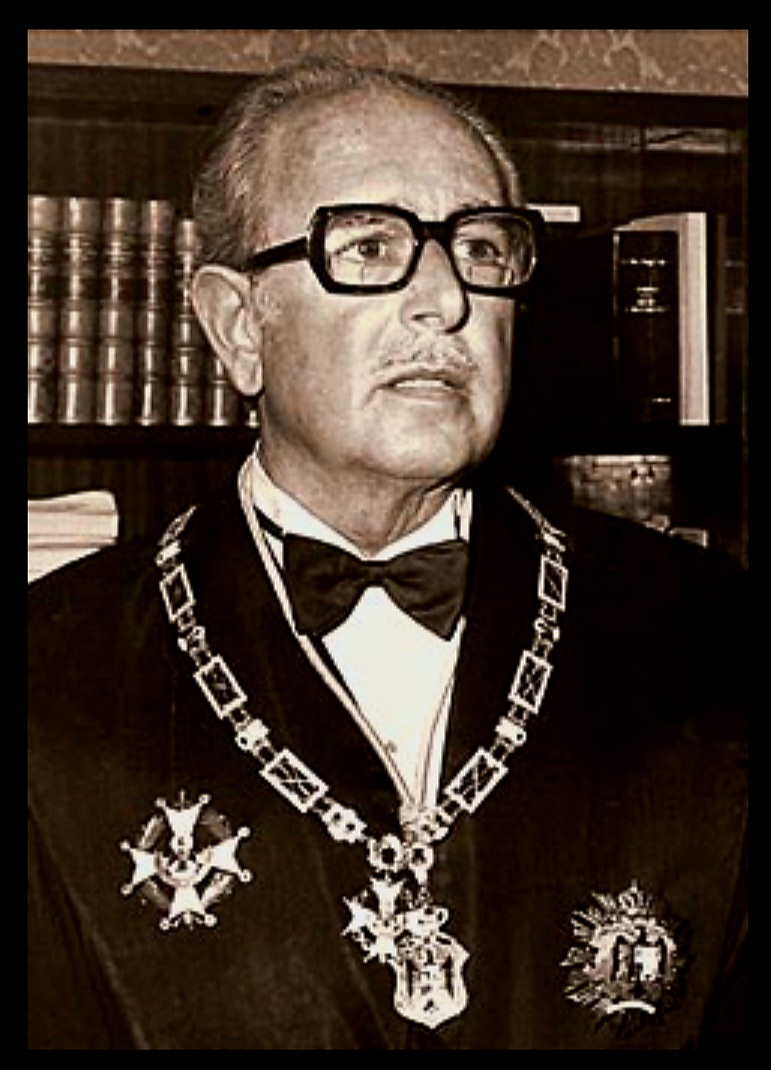

Procurator of Cortes Españolas (for Madrid)
- In office 16 March 1943 – 2 October 1944
- President: Francisco Franco
- In office 6 November 1967 – 12 November 1971
- President: Francisco Franco

Cortes Generales deputy (for Madrid)
- In office 18 October 1977 – 17 January 1978
- Monarch: Juan Carlos I
- Prime Minister: Adolfo Suárez

Prosecutor General of the Realm
- In office 13 January 1978 – 14 November 1980
- Monarch: Juan Carlos I
- Prime Minister: Adolfo Suárez
- Preceded by: Eleuterio González Zapatero
- Succeeded by: José María Gil-Albert

Personal details
- Born: 16 November 1914 Melilla, Spain
- Died: 3 February 1989 (aged 74) Madrid, Spain
- Party: Spanish Falange, Falange Española de las JONS, FET y de las JONS, Union of the Democratic Centre
- Relatives: Joaquín Fanjul (father); Borja Fanjul (grandson)
- Education: Complutense University of Madrid
- Occupation: Jurist, politician, lawyer, banker

Juan Manuel Fanjul Sedeño (16 November 1914 – 3 February 1989) was a Spanish politician, lawyer, and banker. An active Falangist in his youth, during the Spanish Civil War he served as Deputy Secretary General of the FET y de las JONS. After the Second World War, he served as a member of the Francoist Cortes. Later, however, he moved towards more moderate positions and came into conflict with the regime. After Francisco Franco's death, he was elected to the Constituent Cortes and served as Prosecutor General of the State from 1978 to 1980.

== Biography ==
=== Early years ===
Fanjul was born in Melilla on November 14, 1914, into a military family. He was the son of General Joaquín Fanjul, a veteran of the Rif War who would play a significant role in the army. Juan Manuel studied law at the Complutense University of Madrid, graduating in 1935. An initial member of José María Albiñana's anti-republican militias, in 1933 he joined the Falange Española. In the early days, he was part of the triumvirate that led the Spanish University Syndicate (SEU) along with Manuel Valdés Larrañaga and Luis Zaragoza, and later served as the SEU's leader for Madrid. On several occasions, he acted as a liaison between his father and José Antonio Primo de Rivera, the leader of the Falange.

=== Spanish Civil War ===
In July 1936, when the coup against the Second Spanish Republic took place, he participated in the Siege of the Montaña Barracks of Madrid with his father Joaquín Fanjul, the leader of the uprising nationalist forces. Wounded during the Republican assault on the barracks, he managed to escape and eventually took refuge in the Chilean embassy. A very different fate awaited other members of his family during the war: his father, who had been taken prisoner, was tried for military rebellion, sentenced to death, and executed; his brother José Ignacio, arrested, was murdered in the Cárcel Modelo massacre in Madrid. After spending some time as a refugee in the Chilean embassy, Juan Manuel Fanjul managed to reach the Nationalist-held territory, where he held various positions of responsibility. On May 20, 1938, he was appointed provincial head of FET y de las JONS in A Coruña, replacing Gerardo Salvador Merino. Shortly afterward, during that year, he was appointed deputy general secretary of FET y de las JONS by Raimundo Fernández-Cuesta, (Note: El «camisa vieja» Julián Pemartín Sanjuán también ejerció simultáneamente como vicesecretario de FET y de las JONS.) becoming one of his collaborators. He held this position until after the end of the war, in August 1939.

=== Francoist dictatorship ===
A member of the National Council of FET and JONS, he was also appointed procurator to the Francoist Cortes. In 1943, he was one of the notables who signed a letter addressed to the dictator Francisco Franco, calling for the restoration of the monarchy in the person of Prince Juan de Borbón. Franco, however, took no action in this regard; on the contrary, Fanjul would eventually be expelled from the single party and the "Old Guard".

Although marginalized from the political sphere, he continued to be somewhat active: in the 1954 municipal elections, he was a candidate for the Madrid City Council for the so-called "Independent Candidacy", along with Torcuato Luca de Tena, Joaquín Calvo Sotelo, and Joaquín Satrústegui; this candidacy was boycotted by the regime and ultimately failed to gain ground against the official candidates, obtaining only 17% of the vote. In 1967, he ran in Madrid as an independent candidate in the elections to choose representatives to the Cortes for the Family Third. He obtained 130,993 votes, winning a seat as a representative. At the end of the 1960s, he was part of the group of contributors to the newspaper Madrid, which had a more open-minded approach.

A recognized monarchist "Juanist", he was a member of the Privy Council of the Count of Barcelona between 1962 and 1969.

=== Post-Francoist era ===
A member of the Union of the Democratic Centre (UCD), he was elected to Parliament in the 1977 elections for the Madrid constituency.

The Suárez government appointed him Prosecutor General of the Realm, a position he held between 1978 and 1980.

He died in Madrid on February 3, 1989.

== Distinctions ==
- Grand Cross of the Order of Civil Merit (1972)
- Grand Cross of the Order of Saint Raymond of Peñafort (1979)
- Grand Cross of the Order of Charles III (1980)

== Works ==
- The civil liability of professionals. Madrid, 1960.
- The reform of the capitalist enterprise. Madrid, 1967.
- 158 Supreme Court Judgments. Madrid, 1973.

== Bibliography ==
- Alcoba López, Antonio (2002). Auge y ocaso de El Frente de Juventudes. Editorial San Martín.
- Bardavío, Joaquín; Sinova, Justino (2000). Todo Franco. Franquismo y antifranquismo de la A a la Z. Barcelona: Plaza & Janés.
- Barreiro Carballal, Carlos (2014). Luchas de ayer, disputas de hoy y desafíos de mañana. Cultiva Libros.
- Casals, Xavier (2005). Franco y los Borbones. La corona de España y sus pretendientes. Planeta.
- Castellanos López, José Antonio (2014). Quién fue quién en la transición en Castilla-La Mancha (1977-1982). Cuenca: Universidad de Castilla-La Mancha. ISBN 978-84-9044-119-0.
- Díaz, Onésimo; de Meer, Fernando (2010). Rafael Calvo Serer: La búsqueda de la libertad (1954-1988). Madrid: Rialp. ISBN 978-84-321-3833-1.
- Fernández, Carlos (2000). Alzamiento y guerra civil en Galicia (1936-1939). Vol. II. Ediciós do Castro.
- Figuero, Javier (1981). UCD: La empresa que creó Adolfo Suárez. Grijalbo.
- Garay Vera, Cristián (2000). Relaciones Tempestuosas: Chile y España 1936-1940. Universidad de Santiago de Chile.
- García Venero, Maximiano (1967). El general Fanjul. Madrid en el Alzamiento Nacional. Ediciones Cid.
- Gómez Pérez, Rafael (1988). El franquismo y la Iglesia. Madrid: Ediciones Rialp. ISBN 84-321-2343-9.
- González Madrid, Damián-Alberto (2007). Los hombres de la dictadura. Personal político franquista en Castilla-La Mancha, 1939-1945. Almud.
- Jerez Riesco, José Luis (2006). El Madrid de la Falange. Nueva República.
- Lizcano, Pablo (2006). La Generación del 56. La Universidad contra Franco. Saber y Comunicación.
- López Villaverde, Ángel Luis (1997). Cuenca durante la II República: elecciones, partidos y vida política, 1931-1936. Universidad de Castilla-La Mancha.
- Menéndez, Manuel Ángel; Fontes, Ignacio (2002). Quién es quién: sus señorías los diputados. Foca.
- Montoliú, Pedro (2000). Madrid en la guerra civil: La historia. Madrid: Sílex. ISBN 84-7737-072-9.
- Moral, Antonio M. (2008). Diplomacia, humanitarismo y espionaje en la Guerra Civil española. Biblioteca Nueva.
- Pascual, Pedro (1986). Partidos politicos y constitucionales en España. Fragua.
- Platón, Miguel (1998). Alfonso XIII: de Primo de Rivera a Franco. La tentación autoritaria de la Monarquía. Plaza & Janés.
- Romero Salvadó, Francisco J. (2013). Historical Dictionary of the Spanish Civil War. Scarecrow Press. ISBN 978-0-8108-8009-2.
- Ruiz, Julius (2014) [2012]. The 'Red Terror' and the Spanish Civil War. Nueva York: Cambridge University Press. ISBN 978-1-107-05454-7.
- Thomàs, Joan Maria (1999). Lo que fue la Falange. La Falange y los falangistas de José Antonio, Hedilla y la Unificación. Franco y el fin de la Falange Española de las JONS. Barcelona: Plaza & Janés.
- Thomàs, Joan Maria (2001). La Falange de Franco: fascismo y fascistización en el régimen franquista, 1937-1945. Barcelona: Plaza & Janés.
