= Siege of the Montaña Barracks =

Siege in Madrid at the start of the Spanish Civil War

Coordinates: 40°25′26.52″N 3°43′3.52″W

- Part of the Spanish coup of July 1936
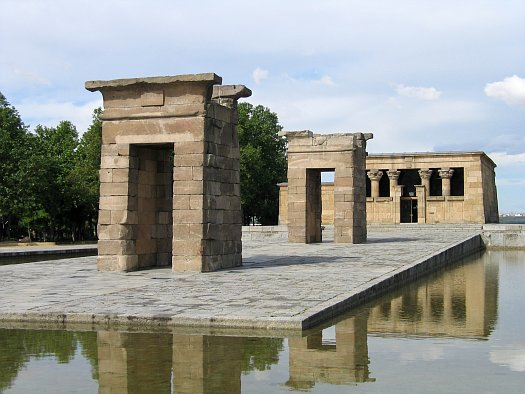
- Temple of Debod, former location of the barracks
Date	18–20 July 1936
Location	Montaña del Príncipe Pío, Madrid
Result	Republican victory

Belligerents
Nationalist Spain	Spanish Republic

Commanders and leaders
Joaquín Fanjul Goñi; M. García de la Herrán †; M. Serra Bartolomé †	José Miaja Menant; Juan Guilloto León; Cipriano Mera Sanz; Hidalgo de Cisneros; Ricardo Burillo Stholle; Urbano Orad de la Torre; Ernesto Carratalá †

Strength
2,000 soldiers; 500 falangists	~3,000 security forces

Casualties and losses
200–1,000 killed	Unknown

The siege of the Montaña Barracks (Spanish: Sitio del Cuartel de la Montaña) was the two-day siege which marked the initial failure of the July 1936 uprising against the Second Spanish Republic in Madrid, on 18–20 July 1936, at the start of the Spanish Civil War. The bulk of the security forces in Madrid remained loyal to the government, and supported by workers' militias, crushed the uprising.

== Background ==
On 17–18 July 1936, a part of the Spanish army, led by a group of officers—among them Generals Jose Sanjurjo, Francisco Franco, Emilio Mola, Manuel Goded and Gonzalo Queipo de Llano—tried to overthrow the Popular Front government of the Second Spanish Republic. The occupation of the capital, Madrid, was one of the prime goals of the coup of July 1936. This coup in this particular location was ill-planned and clumsily executed. There was no coordination between the diverse elements who were hostile to the republic – falangists, monarchists, some army officers, and members of the Spanish Military Union.

The coordinator of the plot in Madrid, Colonel Valentín Galarza Morante had been detained and the elderly and indecisive General Villegas took his place. However Villegas decided at the last minute to avoid direct participation and General Joaquín Fanjul replaced him at short notice. There was a particularly strong concentration of pro-government forces in Madrid. These included para-military security forces and organized—though at this stage generally unarmed—union groups. Finally, a large portion of the officers and soldiers of the regular Madrid army garrison were uninvolved in the plot and pre-disposed to remain loyal to the elected government.

Located on the Príncipe Pío near the former Royal Palace of Madrid to the west of the central city, the Montaña barracks had been built in 1860. It consisted of three separate buildings joined to make up a large fortress-like structure, fronted by a wide glacis and parapets. It was normally garrisoned by three regiments of infantry, a regiment of engineers and additional specialist units, although in July 1936 many of the soldiers were on summer leave.

A further eight regiments, plus four independent battalions and two artillery groups, were based in other garrisons located in and around the city. Finally, 25 companies of Assault Guards and 14 of Civil Guards were either located in Madrid or had been brought in by the Republican authorities shortly before the July rising. The role of these trained security forces was to prove crucial.

== The coup in Madrid ==
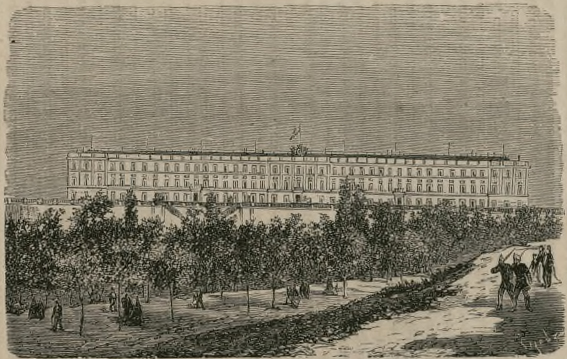
Montaña Barracks in 1876.

=== 18 July ===
On 18 July, news of the military uprising in Spanish Morocco reached Madrid, and the General Union of Workers and National Confederation of Labor demanded the distribution of arms. However the government initially refused to give weapons to civilians. Nevertheless, a group of young officers led by Lieutenant Colonel Rodrigo Gil Ruiz distributed 5,000 rifles among the workers.

The plotters had planned that General García Herrán would seize the army camp at Carabanchel and General Joaquín Fanjul would occupy the inner city from the Montaña barracks, located on the Príncipe Pío, close to the Plaza de España. Other rebel officers should then have taken over the Cuatro Vientos and Getafe Air Bases, but the plan failed. Furthermore, the commander of the Civil Guard in Madrid, General Sebastián Pozas Perea and the Assault Guard—around 6,000 men—remained loyal to the government.

=== 19 July ===
On 19 July, the new government of Prime Minister José Giral decided to issue weapons to the unions; 65,000 rifles were handed over, but only 5,000 had bolts. The other 60,000 bolts were stored separately at the Montaña barracks. The commander of the barracks, Colonel Moisés Serra, disregarded the order of the Minister of War to hand over this essential equipment, effectively marking the beginning of the uprising in Madrid.

On the morning of 19 July, General Fanjul arrived at the Montaña barracks, as did groups of officers from the other Madrid garrisons and a number of falangist and monarchist volunteers. After giving a lecture to his fellow officers on the political goals of the military uprising, Fanjul tried to advance into the central city streets with his troops, now numbering approximately 2,000 officers, military cadets and soldiers plus 500 volunteers.

A crowd of about 8,000 organized by the National Confederation of Labor and the General Union of Workers, some armed, had gathered around the barracks. Assault Guards were seen taking up firing positions on the roofs of neighboring buildings. Fanjul decided to withdraw into the barracks complex and await help from the other garrisons of the city, rather than attempt to break through the siege. The coup had failed in the other city garrisons. In Carabanchel, General García Herrán had been killed by his own troops while trying to raise them against the government and the artillery barracks there had been secured by loyalist officers.

The engineer units at El Pardo had been withdrawn to the north by their officers under the pretext of suppressing uprisings elsewhere in Spain. The First Infantry Regiment at Retiro had surrendered their barracks to government forces without opposition. Finally at the Getafe Air Base, rebels had been defeated by loyal troops after the death of an air force officer. This permitted flights to be made over the Montaña barracks the next day, initially to drop leaflets and then bombs.

The communist-led Antifascist Worker and Peasant Militias formed five battalions that took an active part in the siege. One of these battalions became the renowned Fifth Regiment.

=== 20 July ===
On the morning of 20 July, two 75 mm guns commanded by a retired artillery officer Captain Orad, plus one 155 mm gun joined the siege. Also, a Breguet XIX warplane from the Cuatro Vientos Air Base bombed the barracks. At half past ten, one bomb wounded Fanjul and Serra. A few moments later some soldiers inside the barracks waved a white sheet from the windows apparently with the intention of surrendering. Against the orders of Lieutenant Moreno of the Assault Guards, who were leading the attack, the crowd ran forward but other defenders fired at them from the barracks with machine guns. This happened twice, killing or wounding numbers of people.

Around noon, the crowd maddened by these incidents broke through the main gate. Some surrendering defenders were massacred by the crowd in the main courtyard, several being thrown from an upper gallery. Photographs show the courtyard littered with uniformed bodies. Orad and Arturo Barea both reported seeing a number of rebel officers who had gathered in a mess room and then shot themselves. At least some of the falangist and monarchist volunteers wearing civilian clothes were able to slip away in the confusion.

Colonel Serra was among those killed immediately after the fall of the barracks. The wounded General Fanjul together with other surviving rebel officers, was detained in Madrid's Model Prison for trial. Of the 145 rebel officers who had been at the Montaña barracks, 98 died in the fighting, were killed after surrender, committed suicide, or were subsequently executed.

Total losses among the defenders are estimated at between 200 and 1000 dead while the casualties among the attacking forces appear to have been significantly lighter. The rifle bolts and ammunition that had been the immediate cause of the attack on the barracks were seized by Assault Guards and taken to the Ministry of War.

== Aftermath ==
After having defeated the rebel troops in Madrid, columns of militia, civil guards and assault guards left Madrid and occupied Alcala de Henares and Guadalajara. Later, Fanjul and Villegas were convicted and executed for military rebellion. The damaged barracks remained in ruinous condition until it was demolished and the area added to the public gardens of Calle de Ferraz (Ferraz Street).

== See also ==
- List of Spanish Republican military equipment of the Spanish Civil War
- List of Spanish Nationalist military equipment of the Spanish Civil War

== Bibliography ==
- Barea, A. (2001) [1941–1946]. The Forging of a Rebel. London: Walker Books. ISBN 9780802776150.
- Beevor, A. (2006). The Battle for Spain. London: Penguin. ISBN 9780143037651.
- Carr, R. (1986). Images of the Spanish Civil War. London: Allen & Unwin. ISBN 9780049400894.
- Comín Colomer, E. (1973). El 5º Regimiento de Milicias Populares (in Spanish). Madrid: San Martín. ISBN 9788471400611.
- Fraser, R. (1979). Blood of Spain. New York: Pantheon Books. ISBN 9780394489827.
- Jackson, G. (1967). The Spanish Republic and the Civil War. Princeton University Press. ISBN 9780691007571.
- Thomas, H. (2001). The Spanish Civil War. New York: Modern Library. ISBN 9780375755156.
