= Elisa Serna =

Spanish singer-songwriter (1943–2018)

Elisa Serna (7 March 1943 – 4 September 2018) was a Spanish singer-songwriter, member of the avant-garde of protest song in Spain in the 1970s.

== Biography ==
She began her artistic career integrating herself in the group Canción del pueblo, in her native Madrid, along with singer-songwriters like Hilario Camacho. In 1970, through her friendship with "Las madres del cordero", she joined the independent theater group Tábano', during the performances of Castañuela 70 at the Teatro de la Comedia in Madrid. That same year she settled in Paris, receiving influences of folk music from areas as disparate as the Maghreb, Turkey or India. In Paris, she gained contacts and collaborated with other musicians in exile such as Paco Ibáñez and Imanol Larzabal. Her first LP, Quejido, was released in 1972, with a production by Paco Ibáñez, who had known her when she heard her sing in the Parisian café La Contrescarpe.

Back in Spain, in 1973, she was arrested for subversion and upon her release from prison she was banned from offering concerts and recitals. Her first album could not be published in the Spanish market until two years later, under the title of Este tiempo ha de acabar (This time has to end) and the songs Esta gente qué querrá (These people will want) and Los reyes de la baraja (The kings of the deck) were censored.

A key exponent, therefore, of what came to be called Song protest, has worked with Lluís Llach and José Antonio Labordeta and created the project "Aphrodite" aimed at facilitating the production of women's record. She died on 4 September 2018, at the age of 75, in Collado Villalba.
