= Women in ETA =

Women in ETA in Francoist Spain were few in numbers. Euskadi Ta Askatasuna (ETA) grew out of a Basque nationalist movement with roots that pre-dated the Second Spanish Republic. When Franco seized power, the new regime cracked down on Basque nationalism, imprisoned and killed many activists and made traditional women's activism difficult to continue. Basque nationalists began to stockpile weaponry following the end of World War II. ETA was created in 1952 by students in Bilbao, creating a fissure in the Basque nationalist community by the mid-1950s. Their attitude towards women was patriarchal and informed by their conservative Roman Catholicism. There would be few women in the movement in this period.

Women's involvement increased in the mid-1960s, usually as a result of male relatives like fathers, husbands or boyfriends. The media began portraying these women as being one-half of a terrorist couple. ETA affiliated women began to be arrested and sent to prison. By the 1970s, female ETA members were involved in violent acts of murder against representatives of the Spanish state. Women were also now being targeted if they were viewed as part of the state or having betrayed ETA. The death of Franco saw little change in the status of women in ETA or state actions to crack down on the terrorist organization. María Dolores Katarain had become a part of ETA leadership by the early 1980s, but was killed as a consequence of leaving. An attempt to start a peace process was underway by the mid-1980s. The creation of the 1999 ceasefire would see more women become leaders in ETA. Their presence came at the time of generational shift in organizational membership, with middle-aged male members who were willing to consider a détente with the Spanish state becoming less visible as younger members, including women, more willing to engage in violence took over. Women were involved with bombing police officer. ETA declared a permanent end to violence in 2011.

== Timeline ==
The regime's relation to the Basque language and Basque nationalism has three periods. The first was from the fall of Bilbao in 1937 to the mid-1950s, and it involved active suppression. The second phase was from 1955 to 1975. In this period, the government accepted they could not fully suppress Basque language usage, and consequently became more tolerant of it. The third phase was from 1975 to 1982. Starting before the death of Franco, this period started a period of reconciliation around the Basque language and Basque culture.

=== 1937-1955 (active suppression) ===
After the Carlist Wars, the abolition of the fueros and the boom of industrialization that brought with it a strong immigration and a great change in a short time for the Biscayan society, Sabino Arana founded the Basque Nationalist Party in 1895 with the aim of achieving the independence of "Euzkadi" (the Basque territories) and founding a Basque State. The party maintained a conflictive relationship with Carlism, since Basque nationalists accused the party of being "Spanish," and Carlists, on the other hand, accused the accused party of being for a "separatist" and "unpatriotic" Basque nationalism.

The Spanish Civil War started in July 1936. Immediately in areas controlled by Francoist forces, women's activism was crushed. By April 1939 when the Spanish Civil War concluded, Franco had forcibly made the Basque Country and Basque culture part of the "great household" of a united Spain.

The Basque Country in the early Franco period saw many people being subjected to mass arrest and imprisonment, along with many people being killed. The regime engaged in an active suppression of all nationalist expressions across Spain, impacting Basques, Catalans and others. National flags were prohibited. All languages by Spanish were banned. Basque cultural symbols were replaced by those of Spanish National Catholicism.

Following Franco's victory over the forces of the Second Republic, his government ruled militarily as if they were an occupying force. Consequently, this resulted in many people inside Spain feeling alien inside their own land. Franco supported this attitude, saying on 3 April 1939, "Spaniards, alert, peace is not a comfortable and cowardly repose against history. The blood of those who fell for the Homeland does not allow for forgetfulness, sterility or betrayal Spanish. Be alert. Spain is still at war against all enemies from within or from abroad."

In the Basque Country, following the Nationalist seizing control of the area, women found themselves being investigated by the new regime. In Biscay, over 300 different women were investigated in this period. Many were also imprisoned. They were subject to scrutiny because people accused them of being involved with or having sympathies for groups like PCE, UGT, Partido Nacionalista Vasco (PNV), and Emakume Abertzaleen Batzak.

Starting at the end of the Spanish Civil War, Basque nationalists began to stockpile weaponry. They also began to train members in weapons use out of fear of the growing risk of illegal violence toward them by right wing actors. This accelerated during the 1940s as a result of World War II, when French Basques were active in their resistance to Nazi Germany.

The 1950s were a period which saw support for Basque nationalism split between the PNV and ETA. ETA was founded in 1952 at the University of Deusto in Bilbao. The organizations founders were unhappy with what they saw as the failure of the Basque Nationalist Party to unify the Basque people in hatred against the Spanish state following a failed strike effort in 1952 in Bilbao. The seven founders believed PNV was ineffective because they were not engaging in active, violent opposition to the regime. ETA grew in the summer of 1953 when they recruited two smaller organizations into their own. In this period, the organization was known as Ekin and was dominated by students and young people. They began to get more members and adherents, and soon caught the attention of the Basque Nationalist Party. PNV invited ETA to merge with them, and negotiations for this took place between 1954 and 1957, with the original group finally agreeing to dissolve and become a youth branch called Euzko Gaztedi. The next two years would be filled with tension as PNV leadership and Ekin battled it out over ideological differences in their approach to nationalist goals. This would come to a head with ETA being formed in 1959 by Euzko Gaztedi members, who announced the split by spray painting "ETA" on walls in Basque cities. The group then set an original founding day on 31 July because of its significance as the feast day of the patron saint of Guipúzcoa and Vizcaya provinces, Saint Ignacio de Loyola. In ETA's early history, women rarely held influential positions within the organization.

=== 1955 - 1975 (reduced suppression) ===
Until the mid-1950s, Spain was crippled by an economic crisis coupled with a government imposed repressive society and culture that demanded uniformity and compliance. Many times Basque nationalism was on the wane during the Francoist period. Regime crackdowns on the movement would serve to continually re-activate it. ETA had a general policy of not targeting women.

Women were not actively involved with ETA early in the organization's history. This was because the organization had conservative Roman Catholic roots, which included the idea that women belonged in the home. Wives of Basque nationalists could become socially isolated as a result of their husband's involvement as the organization asked them to avoid socializing with those outside the group. This both protected the organization from discovery and reinforced the movement's ideology by largely only allowing it to dominate in the home as other voices were not heard. This put a huge burden on women. Children of Basque nationalists had their own burdens to deal with. They were raised in households that spoke Basque, supported Basque nationalist, and lived Basque culture. When they left their homes, they had to speak Spanish, appear Spanish, and live Spanish culture. There are potential consequences for a failure to manage this dualism imposed on them since birth.

Male members of ETA sometimes were forced to hide their involvement with the organization from their mothers, wives and girlfriends because the Basques have traditionally opposed offensive violence while acknowledging a culture that also supported defensive violence in defense of their lives and culture. This Basque cultural approach to violence was also part of the reason during the 1960s that the group claimed they took steps not to attack civilian targets, unlike other terrorist organizations in Latin America, Northern Ireland and the Middle East in the same period.

Starting in the mid-1960s, more women began to become involved with ETA militancy. Most of the women who joined up were encouraged to do so because of their fathers. Such social networks played a key role in recruiting and retaining members. These women were also more willing to directly engage in violent opposition to the regime. In 1969, María Aranzazu Arruti Odriozola was arrested for her ETA connections. The state alleged she was seeking to make connections in Navarra to further her aims. They highlighted her dangerous nature by saying she was secretly married on 5 November 1968 to Bilbao's Gregorio Vincent López Isasuegi. During the 1960s and 1970s, female ETA members were portrayed by the Spanish media as being one half of a terrorist couple.

Police commissioner Meliton Manzanas was murdered by ETA members on 2 August 1968, with his murder being witnessed by his wife and two daughters. Women were arrested and tortured for their involvement in the Francoist period. Security officers would insult women, questioning their status as both women and mothers.

During the 1970s, many of the women who joined did so as a result of encouragement from their boyfriends and husbands. They would often function as a couple within the organization's operations. In other cases, the recruitment by men would mean that these new female members were only viewed inside the organization as women who could fill traditional women's roles. Only when women joined on their own could they generally escape this pattern of ETA gender discrimination. During the latter parts of the regime, some women used ETA to establish their own independence and as a form of rejecting gender norms imposed on them by both the regime and by conservative Basque society. Becoming involved with ETA represented a dual rejection of both the state and of passive womanhood.

1971 British documentary about Spain that shows women, class problems and issues of Basque nationalists.

The 1970 Burgos military trial against ETA involved three women. Genoveve Forest Tarat played a critical role in ETA's assassination of Spanish Premier Admiral Carrero Blanco on 20 December 1973. María Dolores González Katarain joined ETA in the early 1970s when she was in her teens. While teaching in San Sebastian, she attained the rank of militante legal. She soon became involved with José Echevarría, nicknamed as Beltza. The couple had many mutual friends. Echevarría died in 1973 after accidentally setting off a bomb he was carrying.

During the 1970s, ETA was closely aligned with the Provisional Irish Republican Army (PIRA) and the Palestine Liberation Organization (PLO). Their relationship was close enough with these groups that they held joint training activities together.

=== 1975 - present (reconciliation) ===
ETA militants killed women in this period, notably female members of Guardia Civil. ETA justified this as these women not being women, only representatives of Guardia Civil. Estimates in this period female membership in ETA at around 10%. Egizan was a feminist organization affiliated to ETA as their women's political organization. María Dolores Gonzalez Catarain had become a leader in ETA by the end of the 1970s. Prior to this, most women were only collaborators in the movement.

In August 1975, there was a second wave of violence in the Basque provinces, including the murder of several policemen. This resulted in the police arresting a number of ETA affiliated people, including ten who were arrested for the murders. Of these ten, two were women who both claimed to be pregnant. All were given death sentences. The women and four others were given a reprieve by Franco, who was trying to make the regime appear more tolerant internationally.

During Spanish elections in the transition period, women favored centrist political parties and disavowed more the extremist elements like ETA, Herri Batasuna (HB), Catalan nationalists ERC, and Galician radicals. Descriptions of ETA women being "dangerous elements" of Spanish society would continue into the democratic transition period.

Following the death of Franco in 1975 and the amnesty of 1977, many of ETA's female activists returned to the Basque region. A hardcore group though would remain outside in places like France and Latin America for many years. These activists outside the country espouse the radical philosophy that until they were their own nation, the Basque people were a people without a home. Around 12% of all ETA related arrests were those of women. There was no large change in the composition of Spain's security services. Because of the lack of a purge, many of those who had been involved in the arrest and torture of female ETA activists remained in place well into the 1980s.

Basque nationalists believed that the new Socialist led government of 1982 would be more willing to engage in rapprochement. The media and other Spanish political parties accused the 1982 PSOE led government of being weak on terrorism. Consequently, Prime Minister Felipe González directed his government to crack down on ETA killings. The Spanish government also reached out to their French counterparts, and got agreements to try to stop Spanish Basque ETA members from coordinating their violence against Spain from French Basque territories. The government also placed ETA members in prisons around Spain, instead of exclusively within the Basque Country, under the belief this would make it easier for members to leave the organization after their prison sentences ended.

In the early 1980s, 8% of ETA militants in Spanish prisons were women. Iratxe Sorzabal joined ETA in the late 1980s when she was a teenager. By the late 2000s, she would rise to be one of the most important women in the organization. María Dolores Gonzalez Catarain was murdered by two ETA members in September 1985 while out on a walk with her young child. She was targeted because having been part of the ETA Directorate, she had made the decision to dissociate herself from the group. During the 1980s, Herri Batasuna, ETA's political arm, had a number of female participants. Much of their involvement was around seeking amnesty for ETA members in prison. Women affiliated with ETA were allegedly tortured in prison, with the worst state actors being women police officers. Some of these ETA prisoners could not understand how female police officers could not feel sympathy towards their fellow women.

Gesto-por-la-Paz was founded in 1986, with the purpose of condemning political violence in the Basque Country. They would hold silent demonstrations to condemn Basque nationalist political murders the day after any such killings. As a result of their actions, all but one Basque nationalist political parties signed an agreement stating their goal to end ETA's violence in January 1988. The exception was the ETA aligned Herri Batasuna. This pressure led ETA to declare a 60-day ceasefire. The Mesa-de-Argel negotiations started between ETA member Eugenio Etxebaste and the PSOE led government. These talks proved unsuccessful, and ETA resumed their political violence.

Women made up only 10% of ETA membership in the 1990s. Women would not gain major leadership positions in ETA until the organization declared a ceasefire in December 1999. María Soledad Iparraguirre Guenechea assumed control of ETA in September 2000. The 2000s represented a shift in ETA's history, with the organization more willing to recruit young women. During the early 2000s, Iratxe Sorzabal Diaz served as an ETA spokesperson for female ETA prisoners. The emergence of women in more prominent roles in ETA occurred with a generational shift in organizational membership, with middle-aged male members who were willing to consider a détente with the Spanish state becoming less visible as younger members more willing to engage in violence took over. Motherhood did not diminish the willingness of female ETA members to engage in violence against the Spanish state and Spanish population.

In 2009, ETA worked on creating a peace deal with the Spanish government modeled after the one signed in 2006 between the Irish government and the IRA. Izaskun Lesaca was tried by the French courts for her involvement with ETA, and was found guilty in absentee of recruiting members to a terrorist organization. Itziar Fernandez and Oihana De Cerain were both female members of ETA in 2009. Oihana De Cerain was arrested in June 2009 for her involvement in the group, and was accused of identifying targets for ETA violence. Two civil guard officers were murdered by ETA members in Palma de Mallorca in 2009. They died because of a car bomb. Two women, Itziar Moreno Martinez and Iratxe Yanez Ortiz de Barron, were both suspects in the bombing. Iratxe Sorzabal Diaz was believed to be the new leader of ETA by 2009. In 2011, ETA declared a permanent end to violence. ETA member Ines del Rio was freed in 2013 at the direction of the European Court of Human Rights. She had been denied early release in 2008 as a result of the retroactive application of the 2006 Parot doctrine. The courts said the law could not be applied in this way.

== Gender and family ==
ETA has traditionally been very patriarchal in their views because of their alignment with traditional and conservative Roman Catholicism. Historically, the Basque country family structure has required men leave the home for long periods of time for work. This could be tending sheep or going out to sea. Consequently, women were often left in charge of the day-to-day running of the Basque home. Fathers were the authority figures, while mothers did all the work. In rural areas of the Basque country, families tended to have patriarchal power structures. Women were often required to look for paid work outside the home as their farms were not self-sustainable given the economic situation in Spain at the time. Middle class Basque nationalist families in the Franco period tended to support the regime's position on families.
