= Mikel Azurmendi =

Basque writer (1942–2021)

Mikel Azurmendi (10 December 1942 in Spain – 6 August 2021) was a Spanish anthropologist, ETA dissident, and writer. He was the co-founder of the counter-ETA groups Foro Ermua and ¡Basta Ya!.

In 2004, Basque singer-songwriter Imanol Larzabal released his album Ausencia, singing in Spanish to honor Azurmendi. Imanol a personal friend who had also decided to leave the Basque Country.
