= Príncipe Pío (hill) =

Hill in Madrid, Spain

Coordinates: 40.424°N 3.718°W

Príncipe Pío hill (Spanish: Montaña del Príncipe Pío) is a hill in western Madrid, Spain, on the edge of Parque del Oeste. Formerly part of the royal Florida estate, it later gave its name to nearby Príncipe Pío station and is now the site of the Temple of Debod and its gardens.

== History ==
The hill originally formed part of the Florida estate on the western outskirts of Madrid. During the 17th century the property passed through several owners before being acquired by Francisco de Moura y Melo, 3rd Marquess of Castel Rodrigo, who built a palace at the foot of the hill, on the site later occupied by Estación del Norte. The estate later passed to the Pío de Saboya family, from whom both the hill and the modern station took their name.

In 1792 Charles IV acquired the Quinta de la Florida and incorporated it into the Real Sitio de la Florida, a royal estate that extended along the Manzanares. In 1831 the Infante Francisco de Paula turned the hill into a public park. The site remained prominent in 19th-century Madrid: it hosted an agricultural exhibition in 1857, and later urban growth brought the Argüelles neighbourhood, railway facilities at the foot of the slope, and military buildings on the summit. The hill also appeared in 19th-century landscape painting; Carlos de Haes's Tile Factories on Príncipe Pío Hill (c. 1872) depicts the area as part of the Royal Seat of La Florida and records it as a place frequently visited by the artist and his pupils for painting outdoors.

Príncipe Pío entered Spanish historical memory after the repression that followed the uprising of 2 May 1808. Forty-three people shot by French troops against the walls of the hill were buried in the nearby Cemetery of La Florida, which later became a memorial site dedicated to them. The executions became traditionally associated with Francisco Goya's The Third of May 1808, although the Museo del Prado notes that the exact topographical setting of the painting remains disputed.

The 19th-century Cuartel de la Montaña was built on the western promontory of the hill after a project approved in 1860; the building was in use by 1862 and housed infantry regiments. At the start of the Spanish Civil War, the barracks became one of the main focal points of the July 1936 fighting in Madrid. The complex was largely destroyed during the conflict and was later demolished.

== Present site ==
After Egypt donated the Temple of Debod to Spain in 1968, the former barracks site was adapted for the temple's reconstruction. The surrounding gardens were created in the early 1970s to designs by Manuel Herrero Palacios, framing the reconstructed temple on the former barracks site. Today the hill forms part of the Debod gardens and the wider Parque del Oeste, and is known for its views across Madrid's Manzanares cornice toward the Royal Palace of Madrid and Casa de Campo.
