= Polloe Cemetery =

Cemetery in San Sebastián, Gipuzkoa, Spain

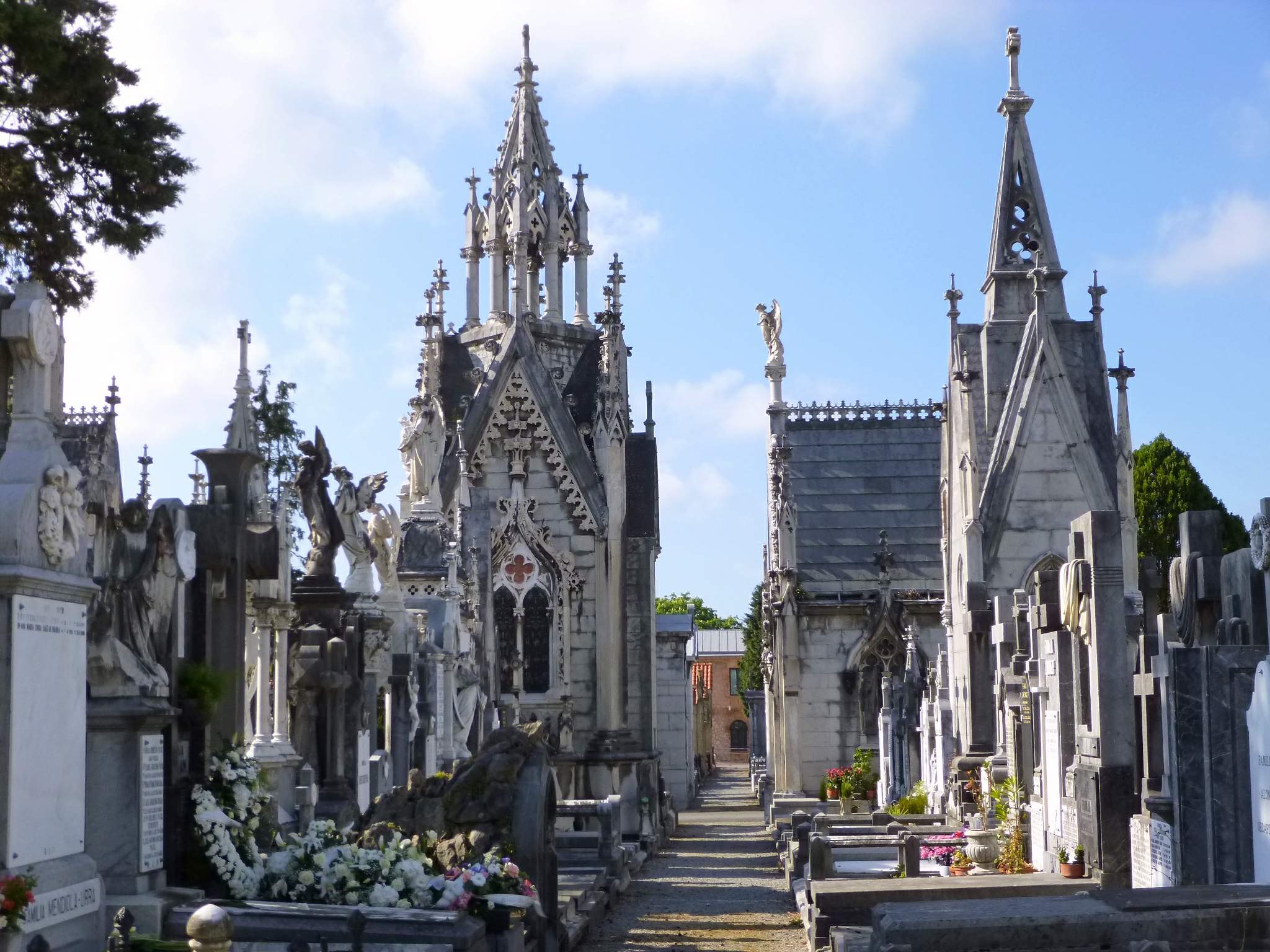
- Interactive map of Polloe Cemetery

Details
- Established: 1878
- Location: San Sebastián, Gipuzkoa
- Country: Spain
- Coordinates: 43.3173°N 1.9644°W

The Polloe Cemetery (Spanish: Cementerio de Polloe) is in San Sebastián, Gipuzkoa, Spain. Designed by architect José de Goikoa, it was inaugurated in 1878, and the first burial took place on August 12, 1878. Its pantheons have classical compositions made by various artists.

== Notable interments ==
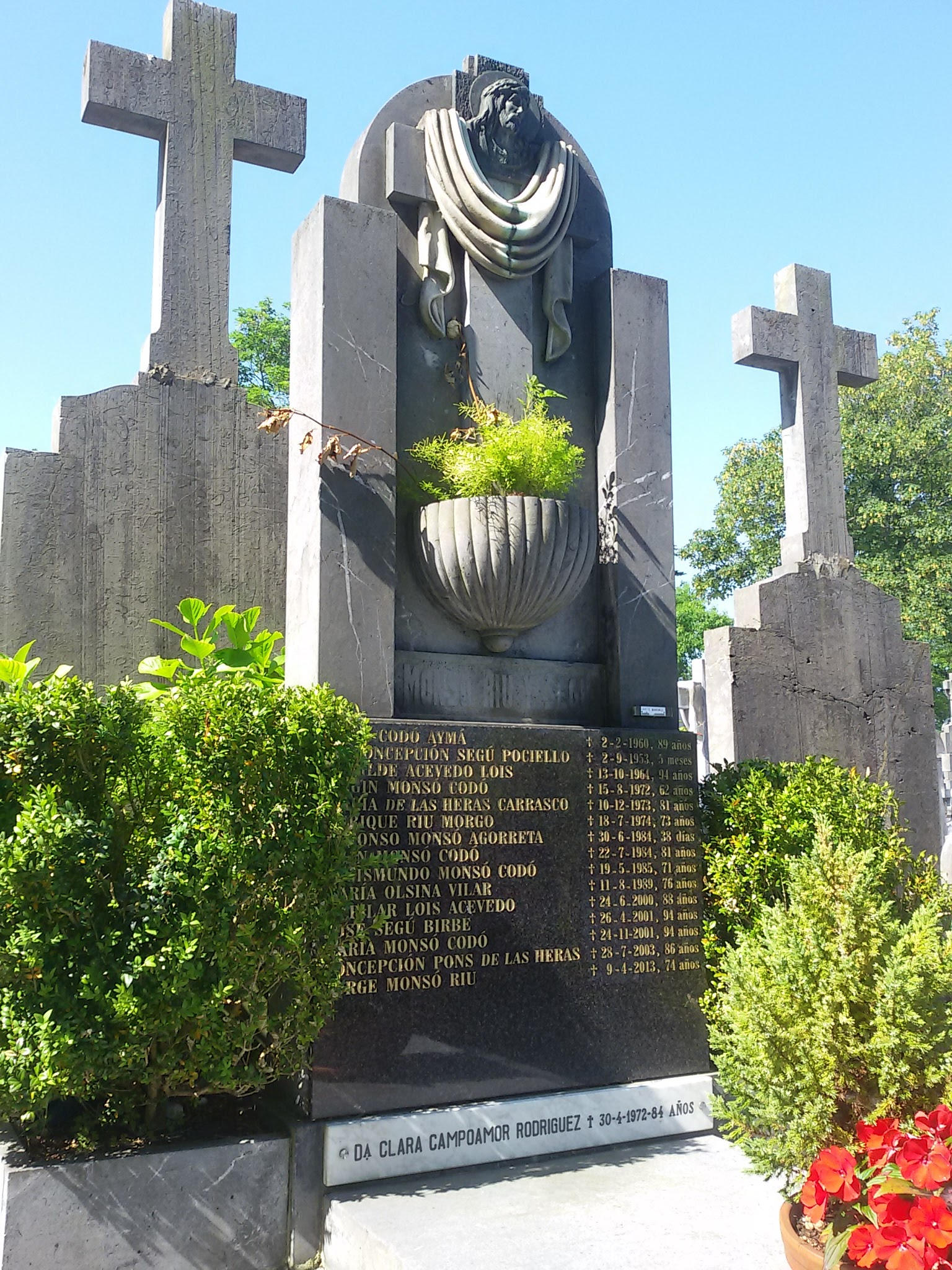
Grave of Clara Campoamor in 2016

- Clara Campoamor (1888–1972), politician and feminist best known for her advocacy for women's rights and suffrage during the writing of the Spanish constitution of 1931
- Enrique Fernández Arbós (1863–1939), Spanish violinist, composer and conductor
- Joaquín Satrústegui (1909–1992), lawyer and political monarchist
- Gregorio Ordóñez (1958–1995), politician of the People's Party, assassinated by ETA
- Fermín de Lasala y Collado (1832–1918), Duke of Mandas, politician and public minister of transport, senator and ambassador to Paris and London
- Imanol Larzabal (1947-2004), Basque singer-songwriter.

== See also ==
- Lists of cemeteries in Spain
