= Clara Campoamor =

Spanish politician, lawyer, writer and feminist (1888–1972)

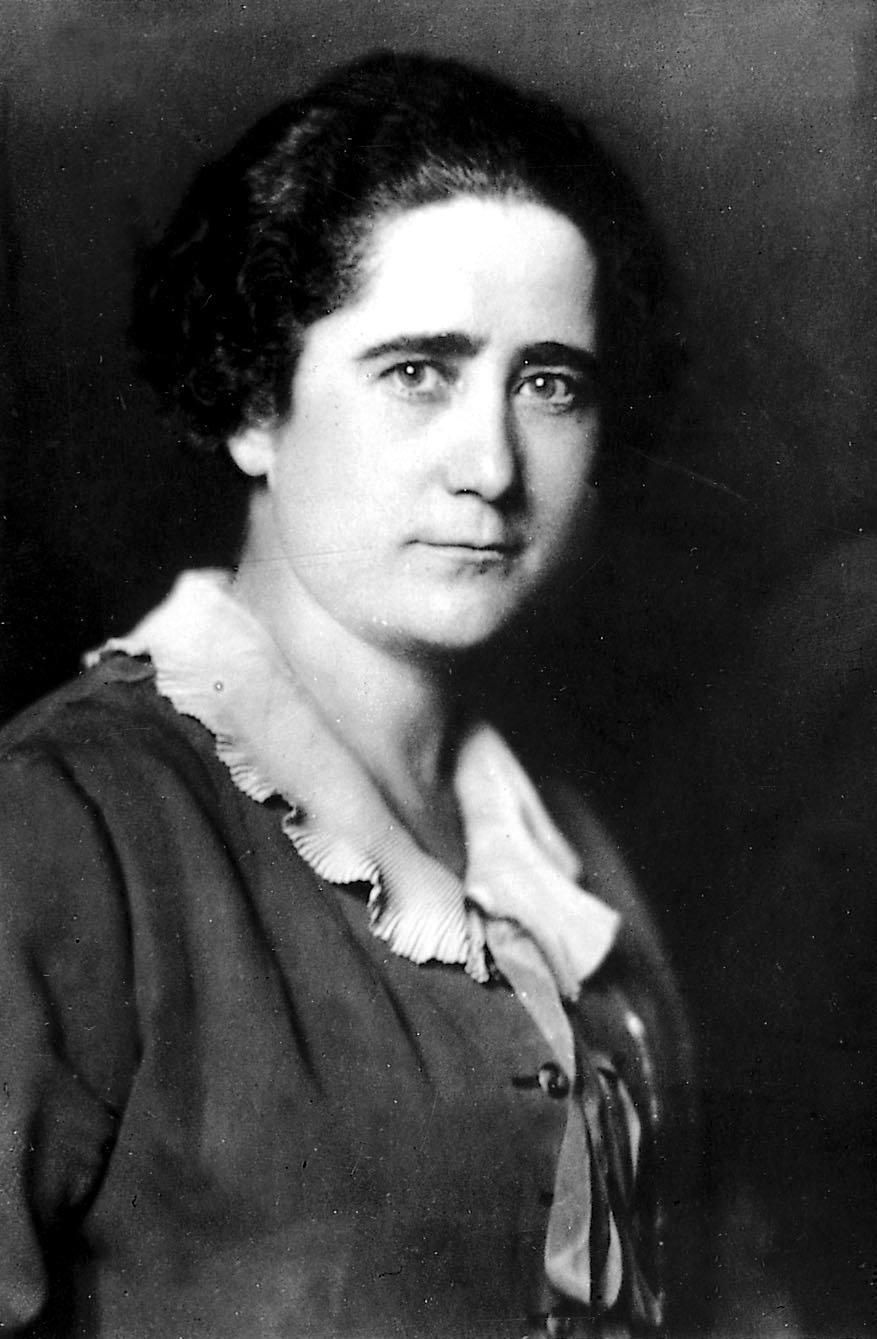
- Campoamor in 1930
- Born: Clara Campoamor Rodríguez; 12 February 1888; Madrid, Spain
- Died: 30 April 1972 (aged 84); Lausanne, Switzerland
- Education: University of Madrid
- Occupations: Politician; lawyer; writer
- Years active: 1929–1972
- Known for: Feminism; activism; Women's suffrage

Clara Campoamor Rodríguez (12 February 1888 – 30 April 1972) was a Spanish politician, lawyer and writer, considered by some the mother of the Spanish feminist movement. She was one of the main promoters for women's suffrage in Spain, included in the Spanish Constitution of 1931 in part owing to her advocacy.

She was elected to the Constituent Assembly in 1931, before women were allowed to vote themselves. She later lost her parliamentary seat and briefly served as a government minister, before fleeing the country during the Spanish Civil War. Campoamor died in exile in Switzerland, and was later buried at the Polloe Cemetery in San Sebastián, Spain.

== Women's suffrage ==
After the start of the Second Republic, Campoamor was elected deputy of Madrid constituency in the 1931 elections (then women could be elected, but not vote) by the Radical Party. She had joined this party because it was "republican, liberal, secular and democratic" and followed her own political ideology. She was part of the Constitutional Commission in charge of the preparation of the draft of the Constitution of the new republic composed of 21 deputies.

In that body, she fought against sexual discrimination, for the legal equality of children born within and outside marriage, the right to divorce and universal suffrage, often called the "women's vote". The latter was a fight towards a more just and equalitarian Spanish Republic. Through perseverance and after her memorable speech, women's right to vote was approved on October 1, 1931, with 161 votes in favour, 121 votes against and 188 abstentions. Women’ suffrage also consolidated the role of women in political life, and allowed them to be part of it, rather than mere observers. The first election in which women were allowed to participate in Spain was in 1933, and only 3 years later, in 1936 (months before the coup d'état), Federica Montseny would become the first female minister in the history of western Europe.

Although Campoamor is said to be the mother of the feminist movement in Spain, Spanish women had followed the UK and US suffragettes in the 1920s, creating the Asociación Nacional de Mujeres Españolas (National Association of Spanish Women) in 1918, and celebrating the first feminist demonstration in Spain in 1921. A remarkable figure of said association was Carmen de Burgos, with which Campoamor would establish a relationship during her time as a teacher in Madrid, before law school. Even prior to said movement, an attempt to women's suffrage had been made in 1907.

The Left, with the exception of a group of Socialists and some Republicans, did not want women to vote because they were supposed to be heavily influenced by the Church and would vote in favor of the Right. Therefore, the Socialist Radical Party faced Clara with another recognized deputy, Victoria Kent, who was against the women's right to vote. The final debate was on 1 October. Campoamor was considered the winner, and as a consequence, the adoption of the article 36, which enabled women's suffrage, was achieved with 161 votes in favor, 121 against. She was supported by most of the Socialist Party members – with some important exceptions like Indalecio Prieto – many of the right, almost all members of Republican Left of Catalonia and small republican groups like the Progressives and the Association of Defense of the Republic. The Republican Action, the radical socialist party of Spain, opposed her despite her membership in and support of the party.

Neither she nor Victoria Kent managed to renew their seats in the 1933 elections. In 1934, Campoamor left the Radical Party because of its subordination to the CEDA and the excesses in the repression of the insurrection in Asturias. In that same year, she tried (through the mediation of Prime Minister Santiago Casares Quiroga) to join the Republican Left, but her admission was denied. It was then she wrote and published – in May 1935 – Mi pecado mortal. El voto femenino y yo, a testimony of her parliamentary struggles.

== Death ==
Campoamor died in exile in 1972. Her ashes were repatriated and buried at the Polloe Cemetery in San Sebastián in May 1972.

== Legacy ==
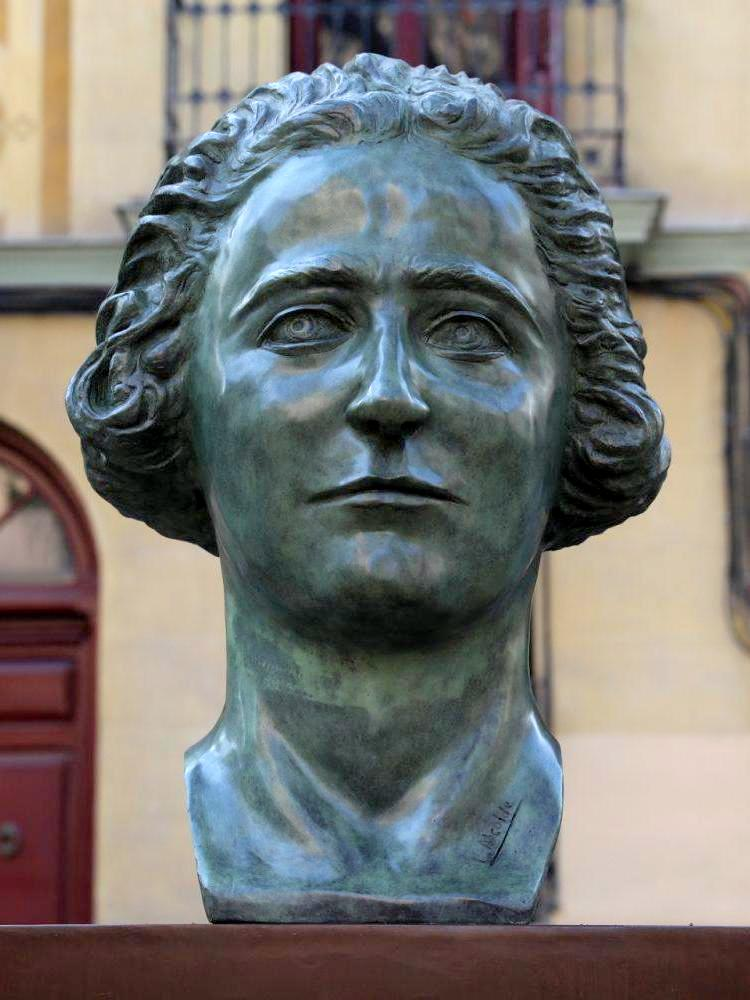
Bust of Clara Campoamor in Madrid in 2006

After the Spanish transition to democracy, there were many tributes and recognitions sponsored by organizations in favour of women's equality. Various institutes, schools, cultural centers, women's associations, parks and streets were renamed in Campoamor's honor. In 1998 the Ministry of Equality of Andalusian PSOE established Clara Campoamor Awards which are recognized annually. There is one per province and especially dedicated to those individuals or groups that have been important in the defense of women's equality.

For a long time, Clara Campoamor's figure was forgotten. However, her crucial role in Spanish politics and fight for women's rights has been commemorated in more recent times, celebrating the 90th anniversary of the Spanish Universal Suffrage approval in Congress. She dedicated her life and career to stand up and fight for women's rights, writing the biographies of Concepción Arenal and Juana Inés de la Cruz during her time in Argentina. Moreover, she participated in various publications and wrote articles for numerous newspapers in Buenos Aires (some of which can be found in La mujer en la diplomacia y otros escritos).

In 2006 Madrid Town Hall created an award with her name, which in its first edition was given to the lawyer and feminist María Telo Núñez.

In 2006, following the 75th anniversary of the women's right to vote in Spain, a campaign for the Congress of Deputies to recognize her contributions via a bust in its facilities was undertaken. In November, the Socialist Party (PSOE) presented an informal proposal asking its Government that their equal policies will be reflected in the production of the euro. Clara Campoamor was the female figure chosen to appear on future euro coins, as the leading advocate of women's suffrage in the Second Republic. This proposal was approved on 12 June 2007 by the Congress, with the support of all parliamentary groups except the Conservative Party (PP), which abstained.

In 2007, the Ministry of Development launched the ship Polivalente B-32 "Clara Campoamor", named in her honor and operated by the Maritime Security and Rescue Society.

In 2011, due to the centenary of International Women's Day, the National Mint and Stamp produced a commemorative silver coin valued at 20 euros. This coin shows the picture of Clara Campoamor.

In 2016, Norwegian Airlines named one of its new Boeing 737–800 aircraft (EI-FJY) 'Clara Campoamor' with her photo covering both sides of the plane's fin (vertical stabiliser).

On 23 December 2020, Madrid Chamartín railway station was officially renamed Madrid-Chamartín-Clara Campoamor.

In 2021, the European Parliament named one of their buildings in Brussels "Campoamor" in her honour.

== Depictions ==
Title	Year	Director
Clara Campoamor, la mujer olvidada	2011	Laura Mañá

== See also ==
- List of 20th-century feminists
- List of suffragists and suffragettes
- Timeline of women's suffrage
- Role of women in Spanish society
