= Yoyes (film) =

- Spanish film poster
- Directed by: Helena Taberna
- Written by: Helena Taberna; Andrés Martorell
- Produced by: Enrique Cerezo
- Starring: Ana Torrent; Ernesto Alterio; Florence Pernel
- Cinematography: Federico Ribes
- Edited by: Rosario Sáinz de Rozas
- Music by: Ángel Illarramendi
- Release date: 31 March 2000 (Spain)
- Running time: 104 minutes
- Countries: Spain; France; Italy
- Language: Spanish

Yoyes is a 2000 Spanish political drama film directed by Helena Taberna consisting of a fictionalized reconstruction of the life of María Dolores Katarain (aka Yoyes), a female member of ETA, who was targeted by that organization upon her return to the Basque Country.

== Synopsis ==
In the early 1970s, during the last years of Franco's dictatorship, Basque nationalist armed group ETA uses political violence under the leadership of Argi. Yoyes, a young independent woman, joins ETA in Ordizia, a small town in Gipuzkoa. She quickly plays an important role in ETA's organization. Yoyes meets Joxean, a philosophy student and they start a relationship.

Eventually, Yoyes finds herself losing faith in ETA's cause. Once the group begins to kill civilians, she decides to leave after Argi dies during a bombing. Dropping out of the group, Yoyes goes underground, and moves to Mexico, where she goes back to college and receives a Ph.D.

12 years later, Yoyes is in Paris, where her husband Joxean gets a teaching position with a French University. When Joxean decides to visit the Basque regions with their small daughter Zuriñe, Yoyes decides to join them, knowing it puts her at great personal risk.

When a newspaper prominently publishes the news of Yoyes's return, her former ETA colleagues mistakenly believe that her presence there means that she has turned informant in exchange for permission to return home. They don't want her example to spread and more people to leave the group. Yoyes has tried to forget the past and be forgotten, wanting just to blend back into society. In the autumn, her former comrades have condemned Yoyes to death. While at a local fair in Ordizia, Yoyes is shot in the head in front of her young daughter.

== Cast ==
- Ana Torrent as Yoyes
- Ernesto Alterio as Joxean
- Florence Pernel as Hélène
- Ramón Langa as Koldo
- Iñaki Aierra as Argi
- Isabel Ordaz as Ana
- Ruth Nuñez as Bego
- Martxelo Rubio as Kizkur
- Gonzalo Gonzalo as Zaldu

== Awards ==
- Toulouse Cinespaña: best Actor, best Actress, Special Jury Prize, 2000
- Festival de Cine de Cartagena: Best First Work, Opera Prima, 2001
- Festival de Cine de Gramado: Best Latin Film, 2001

== See also ==
- List of Spanish films of 2000
