= Borja Fanjul =

Spanish politician (born 1975)

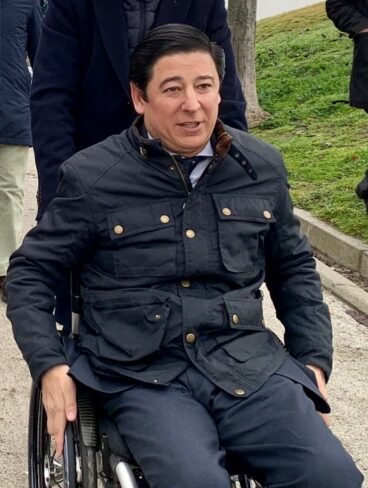
Fanjul in 2020

Francisco de Borja Fanjul Fernández-Pita (born 19 December 1975) is a Spanish People's Party (PP) politician. He served in the Assembly of Madrid from 2011 to 2015 and Madrid City Council from 2015 to 2016 and again since 2019.

== Biography ==
Fanjul's grandfather Juan Manuel Fanjul and great-grandfather Joaquín Fanjul took part in a failed attempt to spread the Spanish coup of July 1936 to Madrid. Joaquín Fanjul was executed by the Second Spanish Republic, while Juan Manuel Fanjul survived and served in the Cortes Españolas of Francoist Spain.

Fanjul has used a wheelchair since the age of 20, when he drove past a red traffic light after a night of drinking and was struck by another car. He graduated with a law degree from the Complutense University of Madrid, followed by a master's degree in portfolio management from the Instituto Estudios Bursátiles and another one on the legal aspects of disability from the University of Castilla–La Mancha.

From 2008 to 2011, Fanjul worked as an assistant to Francisco Vañó, a paraplegic member of the Congress of Deputies. In December 2011, Fanjul entered the Assembly of Madrid after María Luz Bajo Prieto was elected to Congress. He was 18th on the PP list for the 2015 Madrid City Council election, and was elected. He left Madrid City Council in November 2016 when he was made director general of Policies of Support for Disability.

In the 2019 Madrid City Council election, José Luis Martínez-Almeida placed Fanjul sixth on the PP list. After being installed as mayor of Madrid, Almeida named Fanjul his second deputy mayor.
