= Joaquín Fanjul =

Spanish Military officer

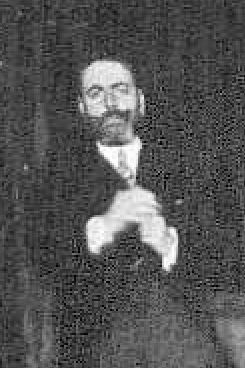
- Fanjul in August 1921

Undersecretary of Minister of War
- In office 10 May – 18 December 1935
- President: Niceto Alcalá-Zamora
- Prime Minister: Alejandro Lerroux; Joaquín Chapaprieta; Manuel Portela Valladares
- Minister of War: José María Gil-Robles y Quiñones

Captain General of Canary Islands
- In office January – 23 February 1936
- President: Niceto Alcalá-Zamora
- Prime Minister: Manuel Portela Valladares; Manuel Azaña
- Minister of War: Nicolás Molero
- Preceded by: Enrique Salcedo
- Succeeded by: Francisco Franco

Cortes deputy (district of Cuenca)
- In office 1919–1923

Cortes republicanas deputy (district of Province of Cuenca)
- In office 1931–1934

Personal details
- Born: 30 May 1880 Vitoria, Spain
- Died: 16 August 1936 (aged 56) Madrid, Spain
- Party: Spanish Agrarian Party
- Relatives: Juan Manuel Fanjul (son); Borja Fanjul (great-grandson)
- Awards: Cross of Military Merit (1907); Royal and Military Order of Saint Hermenegild (1935)

Military service
- Allegiance: Kingdom of Spain (1896–1931); Spanish Republic (1931–1936); Nationalist Spain (1936)
- Branch/service: Spanish Army
- Years of service: 1896–1936
- Rank: Major General
- Battles/wars: Rif War; Spanish–American War; Spanish Civil War; Siege of Madrid

Joaquín Fanjul Goñi (30 May 1880 – 17 August 1936) was a Spanish military officer, politician of the Spanish Agrarian Party and lawyer. A veteran of the Cuban and Moroccan campaigns, he served as a member of parliament on several occasions. During the dictatorship of Primo de Rivera, he attained the rank of general. A prominent member of the Spanish Military Union (UME), he was involved in several military conspiracies against the Second Republic. At the beginning of the Spanish Civil War, he was one of the leaders of the military uprising in Madrid. Captured by Republican forces, he was sentenced to death, and executed by firing squad.

== Biography ==
=== Military career ===
Fanjul was born in Vitoria on May 30, 1880, into a family with a military and monarchist tradition. He entered the Toledo Infantry Academy on June 30, 1896, graduating a year later with the rank of second lieutenant. He fought in the Cuban War. Later, he studied at the Higher War College. A law graduate, he also practiced as a lawyer. He was a deputy in the Cortes of the Restoration for the electoral district of Cuenca, being elected in the elections of 1919, 1920 and 1923. He took part in the campaigns in Morocco, where he distinguished himself. He was promoted to brigadier general in 1926, during the dictatorship of Miguel Primo de Rivera.

=== Second Republic ===
In the elections of 1931, 1933, and 1936, he was elected deputy to the Republican Cortes for the Cuenca constituency, running for the Agrarian Party. On May 4, 1935, he was appointed commander of the VI Organic Division, replacing Major General José Fernández de Villa-Abrille y Calivara, who had been transferred to command the II Organic Division. A week later, on May 11, he was also appointed Undersecretary to the Minister of War, José María Gil-Robles y Quiñones. During this period, many right-wing and anti-republican military officers were appointed to positions of responsibility, while other officers with known republican sympathies were dismissed and removed from their posts. At the end of the year, Fanjul relinquished command of the VI Division and his position as Undersecretary of War.

He was subsequently appointed commanding general of the Canary Islands General Command, running in the 1936 Spanish general election for the province of Cuenca and winning a seat in Parliament with 53,277 votes. He was dismissed on April 1 following the annulment of the elections, according to the report of the Credentials Committee. After the Popular Front's victory in February 1936, he was relieved of his command, left without any troop command, and forcibly assigned to Madrid.

=== Spanish Civil War ===
A prominent member of the semi-clandestine Spanish Military Union (UME), Fanjul was one of the conspirators against the Republic, quickly coming into contact with General Emilio Mola, who had been chosen as the leader of the uprising. He was part of the military conspiracy that led to the Spanish Civil War.

General Villegas was apparently appointed to lead the uprising of the Madrid garrison. However, at the last minute, it was unclear who the leader of the rebellion was; (Note: Según Francisco J. Romero Salvadó, Villegas habría delegado la jefatura de la rebelión en Fanjul.) with the military uprising already underway in other parts of Spain, on the afternoon of July 19, 1936, Fanjul appeared at the Montaña barracks in Madrid dressed in civilian clothes and accompanied by his son, Juan Manuel. Once inside, he read a military proclamation and declared a state of war, leading the uprising. He had the support of Colonel Serra Bartolomé, commander of the regiment stationed there. While the rebels waited for reinforcements to arrive to control the city, the assault on the Montaña barracks began, carried out by security forces and Republican militias, during which Fanjul was wounded. The barracks eventually surrendered and he was taken prisoner, Fanjul being one of the few high-ranking rebel officers who survived the entry of the Republican militiamen. (Note: Como fue el caso del coronel Moisés Serra Bartolomé, muerto durante el asalto al cuartel.)

Once arrested, he was taken to the General Directorate of Security and subsequently imprisoned. A few weeks later, on August 15, he was tried for military rebellion along with Colonel Tomás Fernández de la Quintana and sentenced to death; he was executed by firing squad two days later, on the 17th. He was 56 years old at the time. A few hours before his execution, he had married a widow who had acted as a courier in the preparations for the military uprising. His son, Lieutenant José Ignacio Fanjul Sedeño, was killed during the events at the Modelo Prison, just a few days after his father's execution. His son Juan Manuel, wounded during the Republican assault on the Montaña Barracks, managed to escape and take refuge in the Chilean embassy.

== Later works ==
- —— (1907). Misión social del Ejército. Madrid: Eduardo Arias.

== Tributes ==
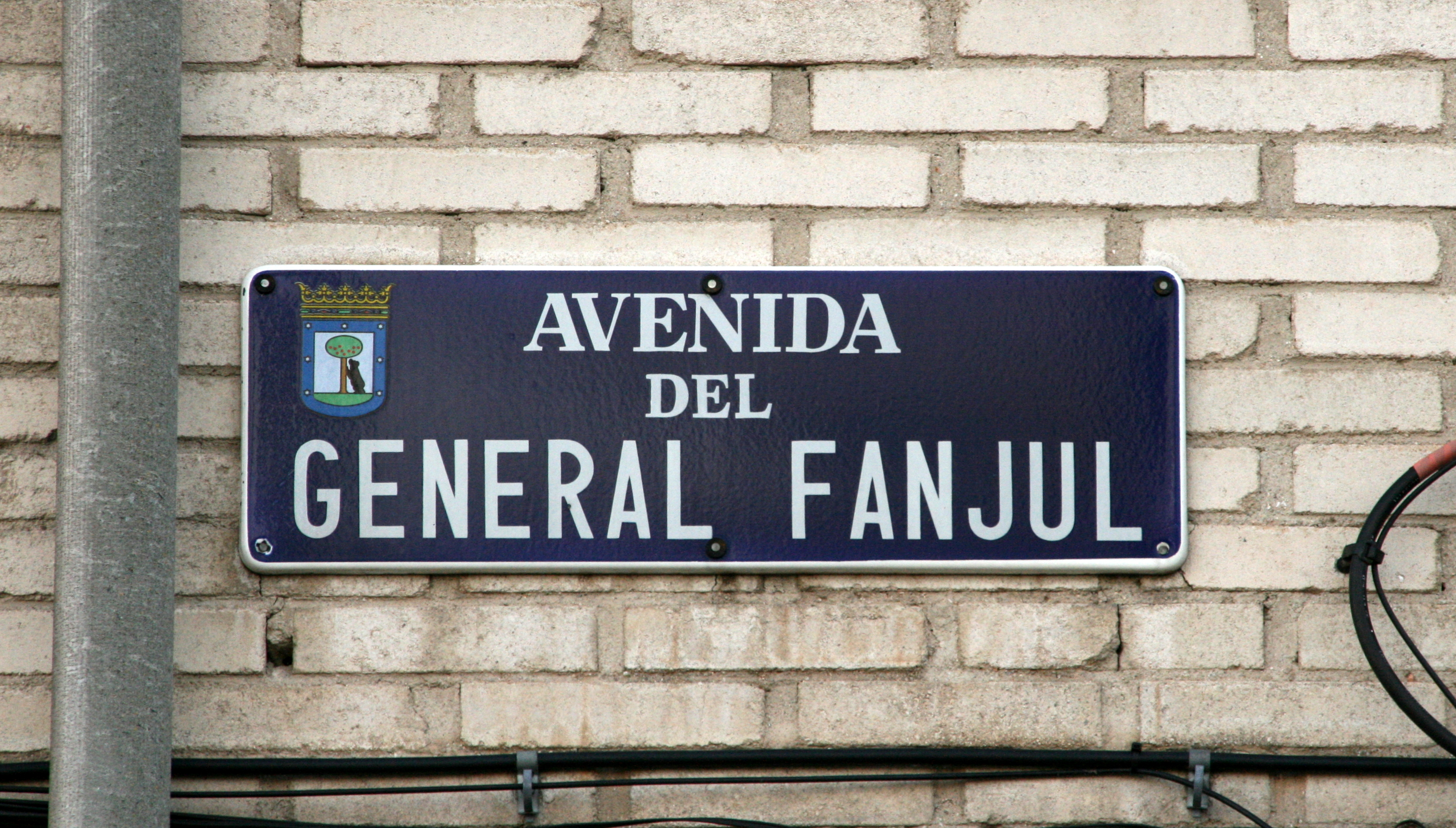
General Fanjul's plaque at Avenida de Las Águilas, Madrid.

During the years of the Franco dictatorship, several streets were named after him:

- In Madrid : General Fanjul Avenue, until 2017, when it was changed to "Avenida de Las Águilas".
- In Santa Cruz de Tenerife, the street formerly called " General Riego " was named after him until December 2008, when it was renamed "Calle del Olvido" (Street of Oblivion).
- In Madrid, a commuter rail station, located in the Latina district, bore his name between 1976 and 2023.

== See also ==
- Siege of the Montaña Barracks

== Bibliography ==
- Arce, Carlos de (1998). Los generales de Franco. Seuba Ediciones.
- Aróstegui, Julio (2006). Por qué el 18 de julio… Y después. Barcelona: Flor del Viento Ediciones. ISBN 84-96495-13-2.
- Bardavío, Joaquín; Sinova, Justino (2000). Todo Franco. Franquismo y antifranquismo de la A a la Z. Barcelona: Plaza & Janés.
- Busquets, Julio (1984). El militar de carrera en España. Barcelona: Ed. Ariel. ISBN 84-344-1028-1.
- Cabanellas, Guillermo (1973). La guerra de los mil días: nacimiento, vida y muerte de la II República Española. Vol. II. Grijalbo.
- Ferrer Benimeli, José Antonio (1999). La Masonería española y la crisis colonial del 98. Vol. II. Centro de Estudios Históricos de la Masonería Española.
- Garay Vera, Cristián (2000). Relaciones Tempestuosas: Chile y España 1936-1940. Universidad de Santiago de Chile.
- Herrero Pérez, José Vicente (2017). The Spanish Military and Warfare from 1899 to the Civil War. Palgrave Macmillan.
- Lentz, Harris M. (1988). Assassinations and executions. An encyclopedia of political violence, 1865-1986. McFarland.
- Martín Rubio, Ángel David (1997). Paz, piedad, perdón..y verdad. La represión en la guerra civil : una síntesis definitiva. Editorial Fénix.
- Preston, Paul (2013) [2011]. El holocausto español. Odio y exterminio en la Guerra Civil y después. Barcelona: Debolsillo.
- Romero Salvadó, Francisco J. (2013). Historical Dictionary of the Spanish Civil War. Scarecrow Press. ISBN 978-0-8108-8009-2.
- Ruiz, Julius (2014) [2012]. The 'Red Terror' and the Spanish Civil War. Nueva York: Cambridge University Press. ISBN 978-1-107-05454-7.
- Thomas Hugh (1976). Historia de la Guerra Civil Española. Barcelona: Círculo de Lectores. ISBN 978-8-497-59832-3.
