= Imanol Larzabal =

Spanish Basque singer-songwriter (1947–2004)

Imanol Larzabal Goñi
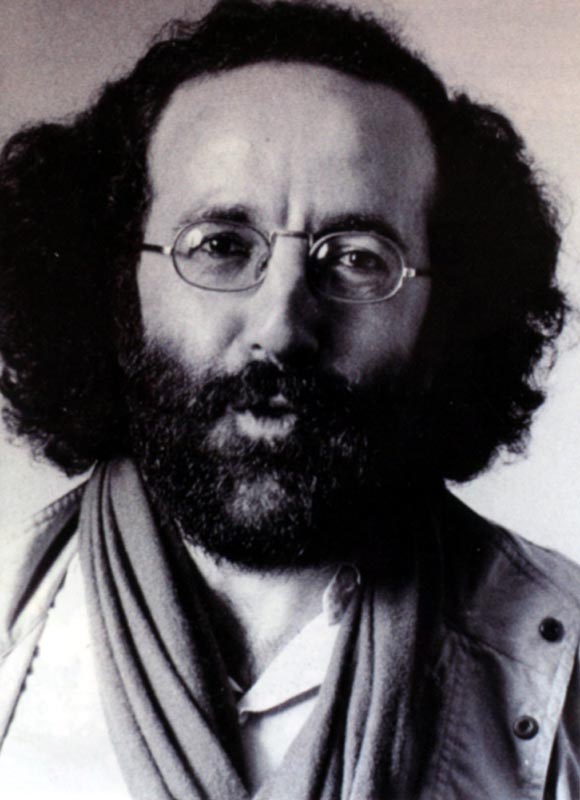
- Imanol Larzabal Goñi (ca. 1970)
- Born: November 11, 1947; San Sebastián, Spain
- Died: June 25, 2004 (aged 56); Orihuela, Spain
- Resting place: Polloe Cemetery
- Occupations: singer; composer
- Years active: 1964-2004

Imanol Larzabal Goñi (November 11, 1947 – June 25, 2004), known as Imanol, was a Basque Spanish singer, composer, and champion of Basque language and culture. He went into exile from the Spanish Basque Country twice: first during the fascist anti-Basque Franco dictatorship, and again in the last years of his life due to conflict with Euskadi Ta Askatasuna (ETA), a violent Basque separatist organization.

== Early life and career ==
Imanol was born in San Sebastián, Spain on November 11, 1947, and completed studies in drafting, although he never came to practice the profession. He began singing in Basque in 1964 – a risky activity during Francoist Spain – publishing his first recording pseudonymously as self-titled Michel Etxegaray.

In 1967, Imanol collaborated with ETA. On August 29, 1968, he was imprisoned for 6 months for terrorism, participating in an illegal organization, and propaganda. In 1972, he went into exile in France, living in Bayonne, Bordeaux, and Paris. It was in France where he made contact with future friends and collaborators such as Paco Ibáñez, the Breton group Gwendal, and Elisa Serna.

== Return to Spain ==
After the Spanish 1977 Amnesty Law, he returned to Spain and continued his musical career in the Basque Country, engaging in various initiatives in defense of Basque culture and language such as the Korrika, a biennial 11-day nonstop running event that promotes awareness of the Basque language and adult education in Basque. Imanol drifted away from the ETA environment: although politically he continued to favor self-determination for the Basque country, he came to oppose violence in favor of singing to stir the conscience of others to the Basque cause.

On June 10, 1985, Imanol was arrested along with his technical team after involvement in the escape of ETA prisoners Joseba Sarrionandia and Iñaki Pikabea from prison in Martutene. After Imanol performed a concert in the prison, the prisoners escaped by hiding inside two loudspeakers that were loaded into the group's van. However, Imanol was released after investigation.

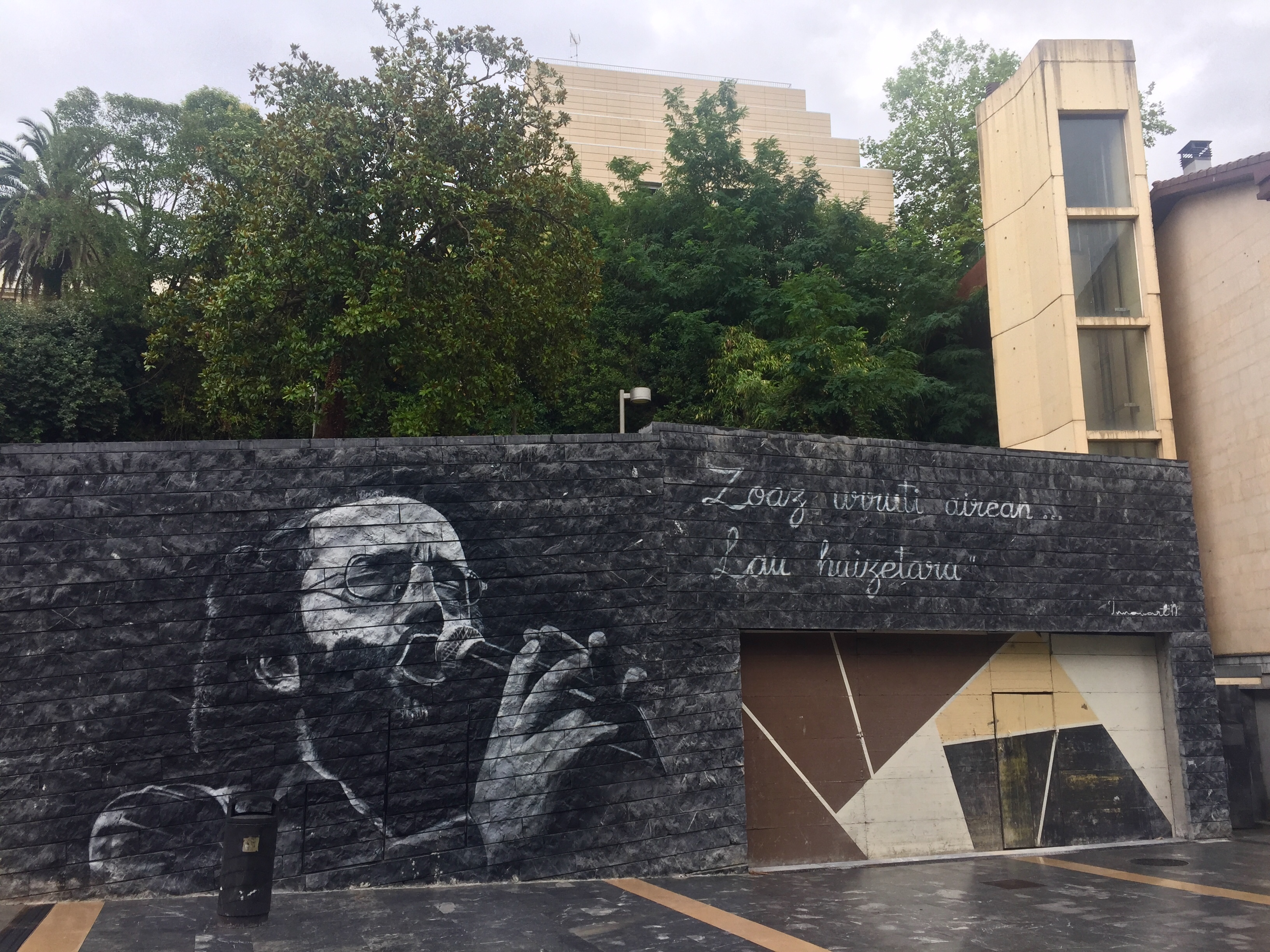
Mural of Imanol in San Sebastián (2022)

In 1986, Imanol participated in a concert in honor of ex-ETA leader María Dolores Katarain (known as Yoyes), who had been murdered by her former colleagues in the town of Ordizia after she tried to leave ETA. Imanol's participation resulted in many of his fans and colleagues boycotting and excluding him from recitals organized by Herri Batasuna. The sales of Imanol's records decreased as political aspersions against him increased. In the following years, he received death threats in the form of graffiti and vandalism of his car.

On September 21, 1989, Imanol performed another concert for Yoyes. As a result, threats against him intensified. In response, a group of friends including some cadres from Euskadiko Ezkerra of Ordizia proposed organizing a further concert in support of Imanol.

On November 2, 1989, Imanol announced a performance entitled "All Against Fear" would be held 3 days later with the participation of several other Basque artists. The following day, even more joined to perform, including improvisational singers (bertsolaris). Telegrams were read from the union CCOO and about 180 former ETA prisoners signed a statement in support of Imanol and rejected the "obligatory thinking" of the terrorist group. Although some of the signatories later withdrew their support, Imanol was given 150 signature sheets of support on the day of the concert.

A month later, Imanol was to perform in Ataun along with 8 other artists at a tribute to Jose Migel Barandiaran for his hundredth birthday. Only 2 of those 8 artists were willing to share a stage with Imanol, the others opposing Imanol's presence or trying to avoid involvement in extra-musical matters.

== Second exile ==
In October 2000, Imanol announced that he was leaving the Basque Country, fed up with ETA's repeated death threats and the "suffocating atmosphere of fear and repression in the Basque region" that ETA had created over the years since he participated in the tribute concert in 1986 to Yoyes. After 2000, he returned to the Basque Country only sporadically, to perform or visit but not to live. Around the same time, he participated in some events organized by ¡Basta Ya!.

In 2004, Imanol collaborated on a collective album in memory of the deceased Julen Lekuona. That year, he released his album Ausencia, singing in Spanish to honor Professor Mikel Azurmendi, a personal friend who also decided to leave the Basque Country.

On June 25, 2004, Imanol died in Orihuela, Spain due to a stroke, after spending several days in a coma. He had planned to perform in an homage to Republicans, but died before the event. A recording of lullabies in various languages was also left unfinished. He was buried at Polloe Cemetery in his native San Sebastián.

== Discography ==
- Orain borrokarenean (Le Chant du Monde, 1972).
- Herriak ez du barkatuko (1974).
- Lau haizetara (1977).
- Sentimentuen hauspoz (1979).
- Etxahun-Etxahun (1980).
- Jo ezan (1981).
- Iratze okre geldiak (1983)
- Erromantzeak (1984).
- Orhoituz (1985).
- Mea kulparik ez (1986).
- Joan-etorrian (1987).
- Muga beroetan (1989).
- Amodioaren berri (1990).
- Viajes de mar y luna (1990).
- Barne kanta (1994).
- Hori bera da denen ixtoria (1996).
- Oroitzen, with Paco Ibáñez (1999).
- Ausencia (2000).
- Son de niños (2001), a collaboration, children's song compilation.
- Versos encendidos (2003).
