= Joaquín Satrústegui =

Spanish lawyer (1909–1992)

- Born: 17 October 1909; San Sebastian, Spain
- Died: 11 March 1992 (aged 82); Madrid
- Resting place: Polloe Cemetery, San Sebastian, Spain
- Occupations: Lawyer and political monarchist.
- Political party: Founder and President of the Liberal Progressive Party, later joined UCD

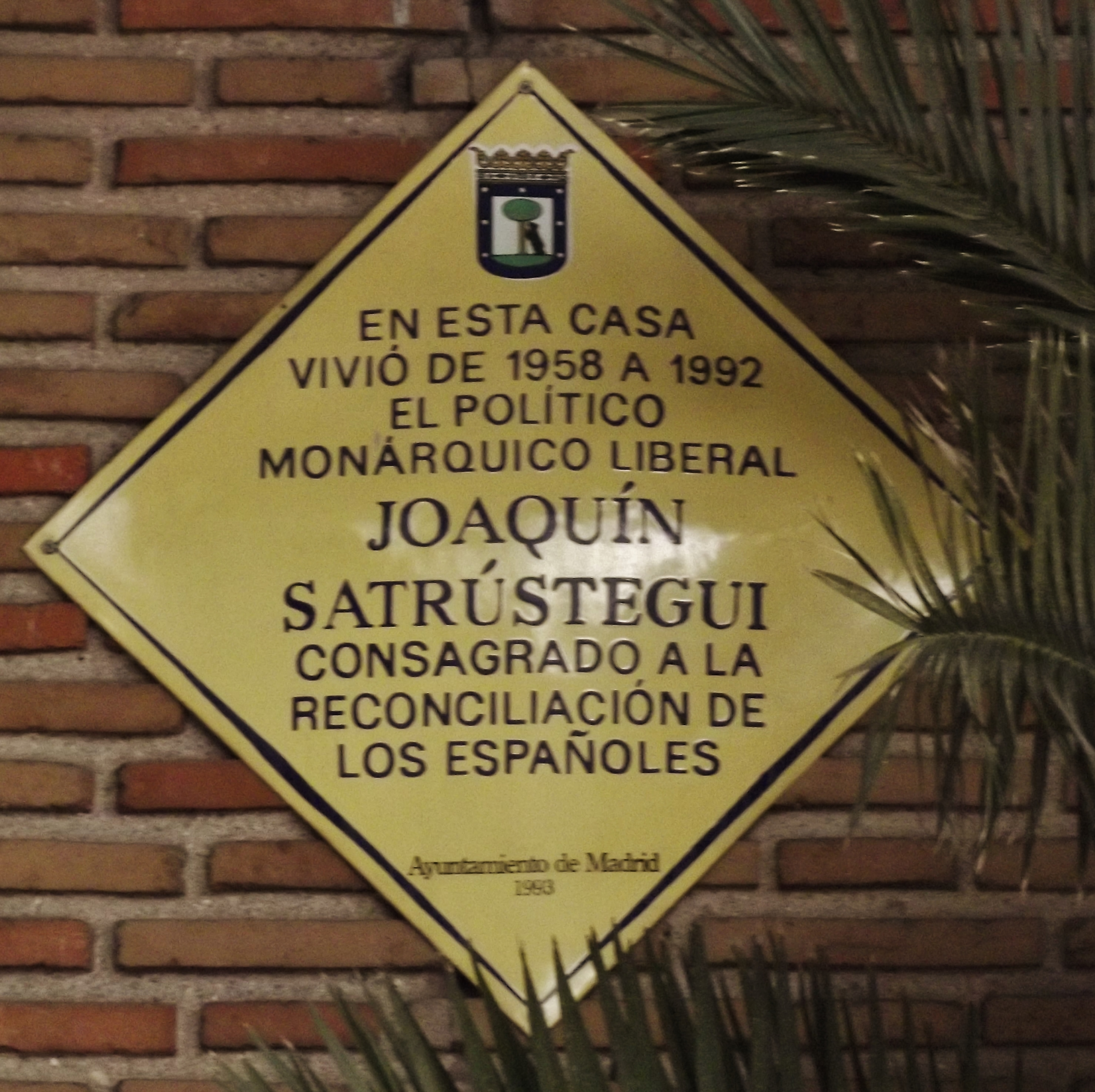
Satrústegui's house where he lived from 1958 to 1992

Joaquín Satrústegui Fernández (San Sebastián, 17 October 1909 – 11 March 1992 ) was a Spanish lawyer and political monarchist. He fought on the Nationalist side during the Spanish Civil War, and evolved from the ultra-conservatism of his youth into liberal positions, always within monarchist sectors. He was one of those attending the conference of the European Movement held in Munich in 1962 (referred to as the " Munich conspiracy" in Francoist Spain). After the Spanish transition to democracy he was successively elected senator and congressman.

== Biography ==
Satrústegui was born into a wealthy monarchist family with shipping interests in San Sebastián. His father was Henry Satrústegui Barrié, Baron Satrústegui. He studied law at the Central University of Madrid, graduating in 1932. He expanded his studies in Economics and Public Policy at Georgetown University (United States). During the Republican period he was part of the Spanish Renewal. On 17 July 1936, within the operations of the coup that started the Civil War, he joined the group of young militants of the monarchical party, led by Carlos Miralles, and on the orders of General Mola, occupied the port Somosierra on 4 January with the aim of facilitating access to the Madrid columns from the north so they could take the capital. During the Civil War, Satrústegui, who had performed military service in the militia university and obtained the degree of lieutenant, became captain of a complement within the ranks of the Nationalist faction.

Wishing to restore the monarchy in the person of Juan de Borbón, after 1940, once the war was over, he opposed Franco, for which was fined and arrested several times. He ran in the municipal elections in Madrid on 21 November 1954, won by Joaquín Calvo Sotelo, Juan Manuel Fanjul and Torcuato Luca de Tena, but their auditors were expelled from polling with the regime fearing their victory. He founded the underground organization Spanish Union (1957), a liberal movement that advocated a democratic state for Spain and recognized Juan de Borbón, then in exile, as the legitimate king of Spain. He participated in the so-called Munich conspiracy in May 1962, so he was banished for almost a year in Fuerteventura, along with Jaime Miralles and Fernando Alvarez de Miranda, among others.

Over time, he became an active supporter of the integration of Spain into the European Economic Community, participated in opposition to Franco and opposed the presence of US bases in Spain. In August 1976, he linked the Spanish Union Federation of Liberals and Democrats Matches of Joaquin Garrigues Walker and the Liberal Party of Enrique Larroque, constituting the Liberal Alliance, of which he was elected president. He had worked with the opposition in the Platform of Democratic Organizations, which formed a platform that was presented to the 1977 election as Senator, eight being chosen as the candidate most voted by the circumscription of Madrid in the electoral coalition Senators for Democracy. In the Senate he joined the Progressive Group and Independent Socialists, along with members of Matches Popular Socialist and Democratic Left, among others. After the dissolution of the Liberal Alliance in December 1977, he founded the Liberal Progressive Party, of which he was named president, but which also dissolved later. Finally, he joined the Union of the Democratic Centre (UCD) party which he left after the electoral disaster in October 1982. He was deputy of UCD for Madrid in the first term, in which he was vocal in commissions affairs and constitutional affairs.

He was married and had four children. He died in 1992 and was laid to rest in the Polloe Cemetery, San Sebastian.
