= Paco Ibáñez =

Spanish singer and musician (born 1934)

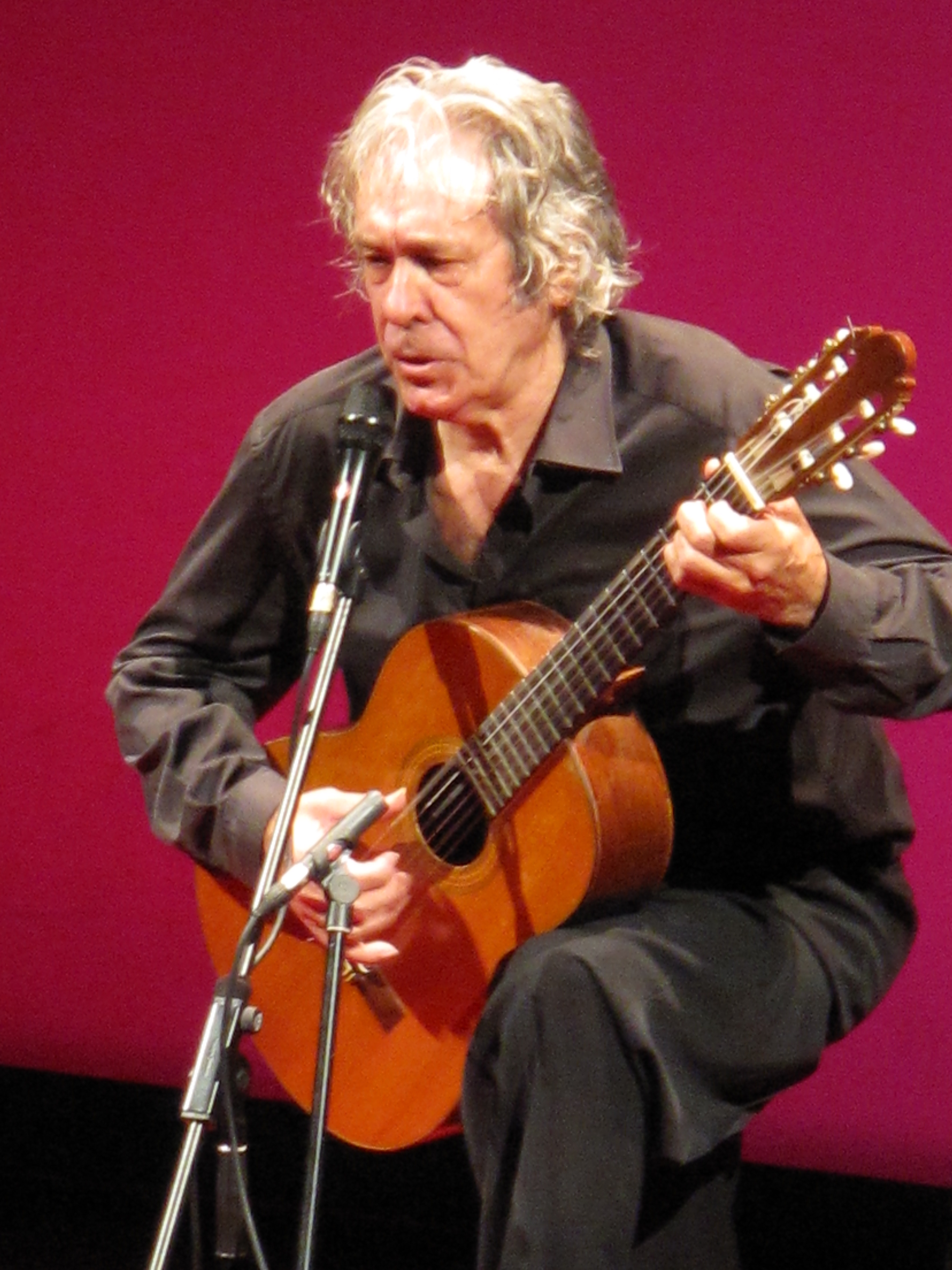

Background information
- Born: 20 November 1934 (age 91); Valencia
- Origin: Spanish
- Genres: folk singer
- Instrument: guitar

Francisco "Paco" Ibáñez (born 20 November 1934 in Valencia) is a Spanish singer and musician. He never composed his own lyrics, but used famous poems, like those of Federico García Lorca, Luis Cernuda, Rafael Alberti or Miguel Hernández. He also sang compositions from Georges Brassens.

== Life ==
He went to France in 1952 and recorded his first album in 1964. During the events in France of May 1968, he performed in the Sorbonne and became known as a rebel artist.

=== Early life ===
The youngest of four siblings, he was born to a Valencian father and a Basque mother. He spent his first years in Barcelona, only returning there in 1994 after a long exile; his family had had to flee to France after the Spanish Civil War due to his father's membership of the anarcho-syndicalist CNT union. They lived in Paris until the beginning of the German occupation of France, when his father was arrested and deported to an internment camp for Spanish Republican prisoners. His mother took their four children back to San Sebastián to find work, and they lived together in her family's ancestral home in Aduna, Guipuzkoa, until he was 14.

=== Connection with the Basque Country ===
His Basque mother and the period of his childhood spent on his mother's birth farm influenced Ibáñez to have an intense relationship with Basque artists and intellectuals such as Imanol Larzabal, Xabier Lete, Jorge Oteiza and Bernardo Atxaga, and to participate as well in the movement Ez Dok Amairu.

He has sung and recorded in the Basque language such as the album Oroitzen (1999), a recording made with Imanol Larzabal.

== Discography ==
- Paco Ibáñez Vol.1 (1964)
- Paco Ibáñez Vol.2 (1967)
- Paco Ibáñez Vol.3 (1969)
- Paco Ibáñez interpreta a Pablo Neruda (1977)
- A Flor de Tiempo (1978)
- Canta Brassens (1979)
- Por Una Canción (1990)
- Oroitzen, with Imanol Larzabal (1999)
- Canta a José Agustín Goytisolo (2002)
- Fue Ayer (2003)

=== Live ===
- En el Olympia (1969)
- A galopar (1991)
- Le concert historique de Paco Ibáñez au Teatro de La Comedia. Madrid 1968 (2002)
- Le concert mémorable au Teatro Opera. Buenos Aires 1971 (2002)
