= María Dolores Katarain =

Basque political activist (1954–1986)

Yoyes
- Born: María Dolores González Katarain; 14 May 1954; Ordizia, Gipuzkoa, Spain
- Died: 10 September 1986 (aged 32); Ordizia, Gipuzkoa, Spain
- Cause of death: Killed by ETA
- Education: Universidad Autónoma Metropolitana

María Dolores González Katarain (14 May 1954 – 10 September 1986), also known as Yoyes, was an iconic female leader of armed Basque separatist group ETA (Euskadi Ta Askatasuna), who became a symbol because of the tragic circumstances of her life.

Yoyes was the first woman to enter the senior ETA leadership, but she decided to leave the organization to start a new life. Her former comrades regarded her as a traitor, and she was killed by ETA in 1986 in her hometown of Ordizia, during a local festival, in front of her three-year-old son. The killing led to unprecedented criticism of ETA in the Basque Country.

== Early life ==
María Dolores González Katarain was born in Ordizia, Gipuzkoa, on 14 May 1954. Her parents were Luis González and Angelita Katarain; she was the second of nine children. Her paternal grandfather, who moved to Ordizia from León, a Castilian province, owned the grocery store in the town, where Yoyes would sometimes help out on breaks from school. Her family lived on the outskirts of Ordizia in a house called Goitine.

According to her school friend, Elixabete Garmendia, Yoyes always had a sense of responsibility. "She was pretty reserved but she had a way of making deep connections with people. She wanted to talk about books and ideas - she was very curious about the world around her."

== ETA ==
Yoyes grew up in Francoist Spain, a dictatorship in which basic freedoms were restricted and there was no right to protest. ETA was regarded by the Franco regime as a terrorist organization, but to many young people in the Basque Country, it seemed like a noble revolutionary movement prepared to fight to topple a dictator and achieve socialism.

Yoyes joined ETA in the early 1970s, probably in 1971, at the age of 17. At first, she operated in a support role, becoming a full member in 1973. In that year, her boyfriend and fellow member, Jose Etxeberria, was killed in Getxo when a bomb he was carrying accidentally went off. A few months later, she fled into exile in the south of France, where she became a full ETA member and participated in armed actions.

Yoyes had to overcome sexism within ETA, which, according to Elixabete Garmendia, was very much a "man's world" even though it was supposed to be a revolutionary movement. She was expected to play a subordinate role but was determined to take part in the same activities as men. Eventually, Yoyes rose to become the first woman in the ETA leadership and was considered an iconic figure in ETA circles because of her toughness and intelligence. In 1979, she was one of two ETA members who gave an interview to the BBC.

During the last years of the Franco regime, ETA was killing dozens of people every year as part of their campaign for Basque independence - mostly members of the Spanish security forces, but also numerous Basque business owners and other civilians. In 1974, ETA bombed the Cafetería Rolando in Madrid, killing thirteen civilians. There was also violence committed by death squads linked to the Spanish state. The unrest continued after the death of General Franco in 1975 and throughout Spain's subsequent transition to democracy, during which the organization vastly increased the number of people it killed every year as a way to put pressure on Basque nationalist parties not to participate in the democratization process.

In the late 1970s, Yoyes went through a crisis, which included bouts of depression. Her mentor within ETA, José Miguel Beñaran Ordeñana, was killed by a death squad and hardliners took over the ETA leadership. Based on the theory that they needed to elicit a more repressive response from the state to attain their goals, these leaders carried out a number of bloody attacks on civilian targets, whereas Yoyes argued there was a place for political negotiation with the Spanish government and Basque political parties and social movements. She felt ETA was only interested in killing and had lost its original revolutionary ideals. In addition, Yoyes had found love and wanted a new life outside a clandestine organisation.

After many arguments and threats, ETA secretly allowed Yoyes to leave the organization. She went into exile in Mexico in 1980, where she studied sociology and worked for the United Nations. While she was away, Yoyes had a son called Akaitz.

In 1985, Yoyes decided to return to the Basque Country so that she could bring up Akaitz with his father in the city of San Sebastian. There were no charges against her because of a Spanish amnesty law passed in 1977. She informed ETA in advance of her intention to go back, but the leadership reacted badly. By this stage, Yoyes had put her ETA activism completely behind her. According to Elixabete Garmendia, she returned to the Basque Country "incredibly well-educated" and was starting to enjoy her life outside political activism.

Late in 1985, Yoyes was shocked to find herself on the front page of Cambio 16, the main news magazine in Spain, under the headline "The Return of the ETA Woman". Friends of Yoyes believe the Spanish government leaked the story about Yoyes' return in order to make ETA look weak. At the time, Madrid had a policy of trying to persuade members of ETA to abandon the organization. On the other hand, ETA now considered Yoyes a traitor, and graffiti threatening her appeared in the Basque Country. However, friends of Yoyes point out that she never publicly criticized ETA, and that she kept the organization informed of her intentions.

== Murder ==
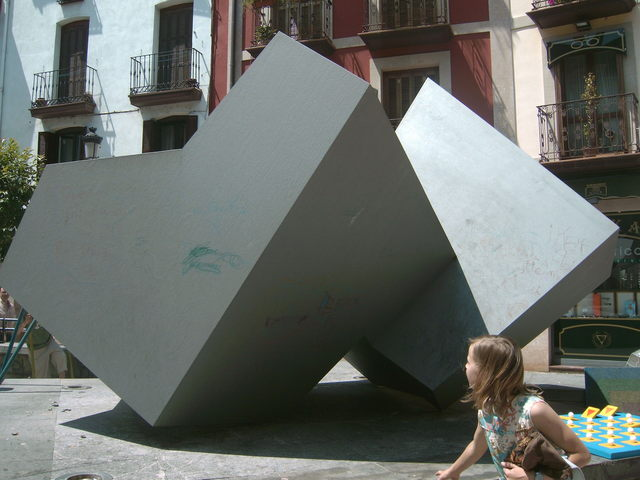
The sculpture Conjunción ternaria 1 sobre 2, by Jorge Oteiza, in Ordizia (Gipuzkoa) as a homage to Nikolas Lekuona, Jose Sarriegi and María Dolores Katarain, Yoyes.

In September 1986, Yoyes and her 3-year-old son went back to her hometown of Ordizia to see a festival. She was shot dead in front of him in the main square. The crime caused outrage and led to unprecedented criticism of ETA in its Basque heartland. The local council in Ordizia suspended the festival. Hundreds of people attended Yoyes's funeral and a protest march through the town where mourners each carried a flower. A letter condemning ETA was published in the press and gained hundreds of signatures. At the time, ETA kept Basque society under tight control and this was the first time people had spoken out. Yoyes' murder is now considered a milestone in the history of ETA.

Yoyes' friend, Elixabete Garmendia, believes there was also a sexist element to the killing. She believes ETA thought it owned Yoyes because she was a woman and acted "like a spurned husband" when she chose to start a new life.

The ETA member, Antonio López Ruiz, "Kubati", was arrested in 1987 and convicted of killing Yoyes. The operation was codenamed Akaitz in honour of Yoyes' son. Kubati was released in 2013.

=== Impact and legacy ===
In 1986 and 1989, Imanol Larzabal, who also left ETA, performed at concerts in honor of Yoyes and against ETA intimidation; as a result Imanol suffered boycotts, graffiti, vandalism, and death threats. In 2000, Imanol announced that he was leaving the Basque Country, fed up with ETA's repeated death threats and the "suffocating atmosphere of fear and repression in the Basque region" that ETA had created over the years since he participated in the tribute concert in 1986 to Yoyes.

The 1997 motion picture The Jackal makes critical use of a female Basque separatist to assist the scenario in its development and to reach its conclusion. It might be taken that Yoyes greatly influenced the model for this character.

In 2000, a Spanish film, Yoyes, was made about her life.
