= Temple of Debod =

Ancient Nubian temple

- Templo de Debod (Spanish)
- Temple of Debod in 2026
- Interactive map of Temple of Debod
- 40°25′26.59″N 3°43′04″W
- Location: Madrid, Spain

History
- Built: 200 BC
- Rebuilt: 1970–1972

Site notes
- Architectural style: Ancient Egyptian

Spanish Cultural Heritage
- Official name: Templo de Debod
- Type: Non-movable
- Criteria: Monument
- Designated: 2008
- Reference no.: RI-51-0012074

The Temple of Debod (Spanish: Templo de Debod) is an ancient Nubian temple currently located in Madrid, Spain. The temple was originally erected in the early 2nd century BC 15 km (9.3 mi) south of Aswan, Egypt. The Egyptian government donated the temple to Spain in 1968 as a sign of gratitude for their participation in the International Campaign to Save the Monuments of Nubia. It was taken apart, transported, and rebuilt in the Parque de la Montaña in 1970–1972. It is one of the few works of ancient Egyptian architecture relocated outside Egypt and the only one of its kind in Spain.

== Architecture and artwork ==
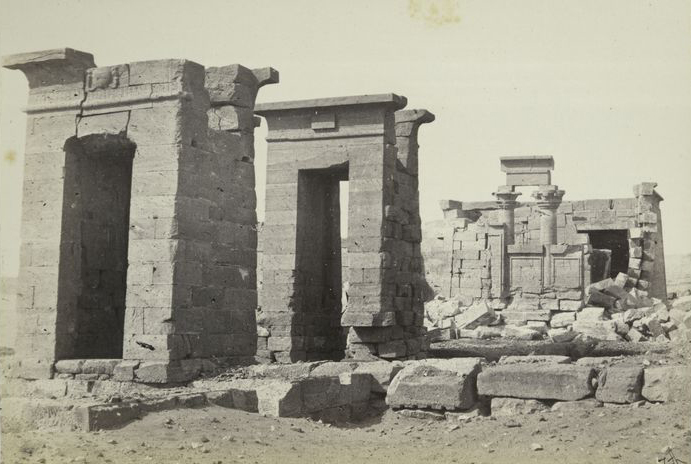
Temple of Debod in its original location in Egypt (c. 1862).

The shrine was originally erected 15 km (9.3 mi) south of Aswan in Nubia, very close to the first cataract of the Nile and to the great religious centre in Philae dedicated to the goddess Isis. In the early 2nd century BC, Adikhalamani (Tabriqo), the Kushite king of Meroë, started its construction by building a small single-room chapel dedicated to the god Amun. It was built and decorated in a similar design to the later Meroitic chapel on which the Temple of Dakka is based. King Adikhalamani is buried in pyramid number 9 in Meroe, in Sudan. Later, during the reigns of Ptolemy VI, Ptolemy VIII, and Ptolemy XII of the Ptolemaic dynasty, the temple was extended on all four sides to form a small temple, 12 by 15 metres (39 ft × 49 ft), which was dedicated to Isis of Philae. The Roman emperors Augustus and Tiberius completed its expansion.

From the quay, there is a long processional way leading to the stone-built enclosure wall, through three stone pylon gateways, and finally to the temple itself. The pronaos, which had four columns with composite capitals, collapsed in 1868 and is now lost. Behind it lay the original sanctuary of Amun, the offering table room and a later sanctuary with several side-rooms and stairs to the roof.

== Relocation ==
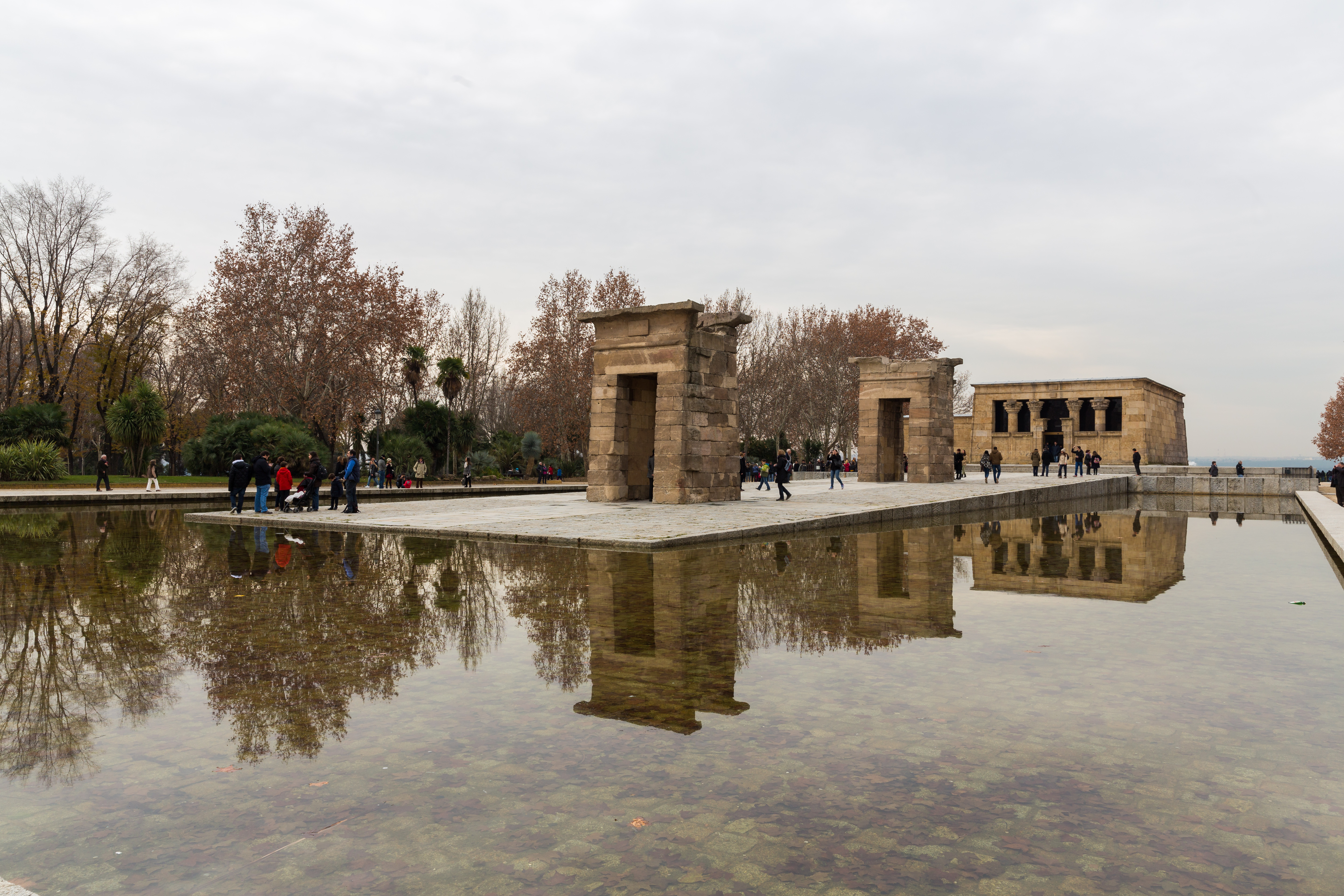
Exterior of the Temple of Debod

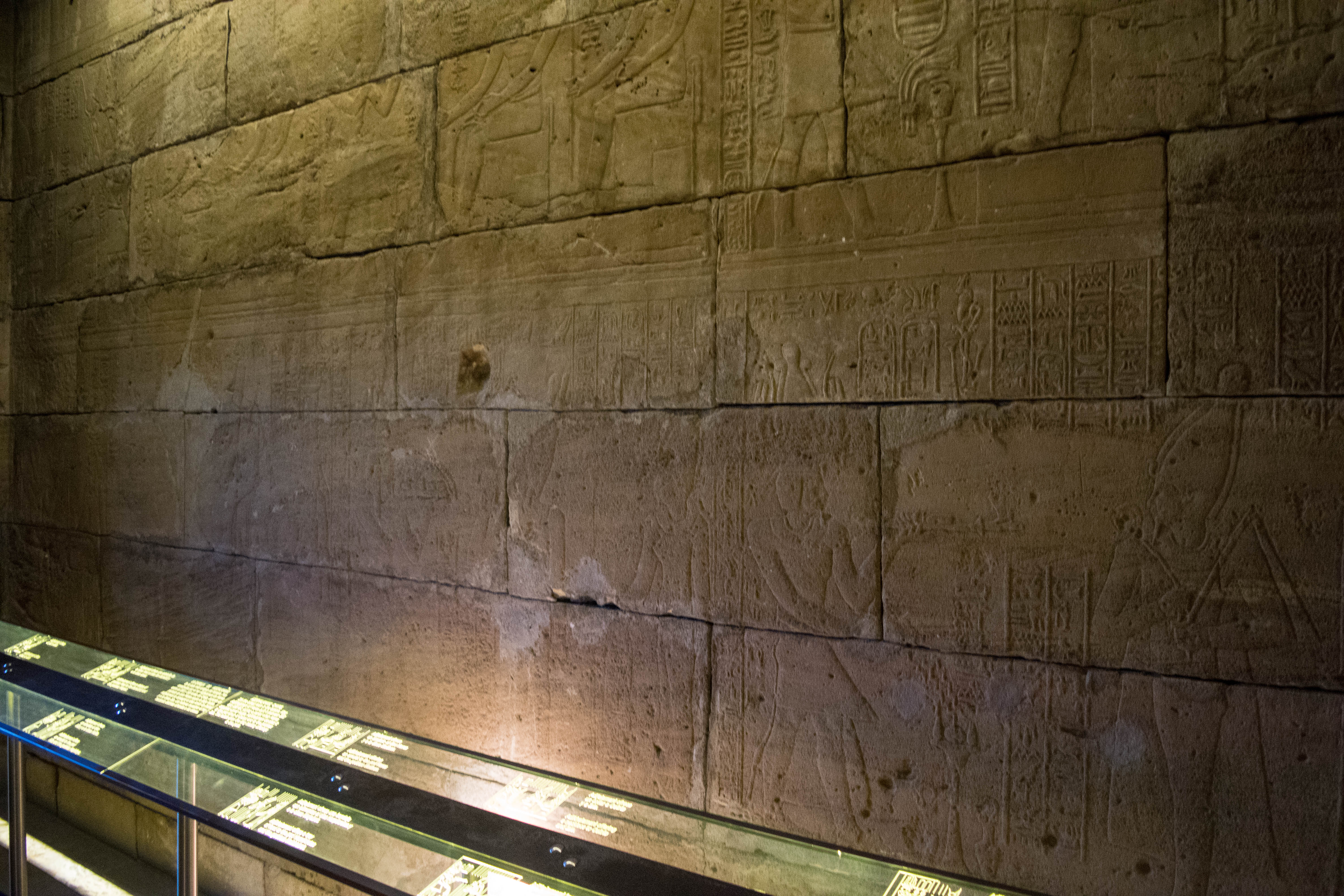
Interior of the Temple of Debod.

In 1960, due to the construction of the Aswan High Dam and the consequent threat posed by its reservoir to numerous monuments and archaeological sites, UNESCO made an international call to save this rich historical legacy. As a sign of gratitude for the help provided by Spain in saving the Abu Simbel temples, the Egyptian state donated the Temple of Debod to Spain in 1968.

The temple was rebuilt in one of Madrid's parks, the Parque del Oeste, near the Royal Palace of Madrid, and opened to the public in 1972. The reassembled gateways have been placed in a different order than when originally erected. Compared to a photo of the original site, the gateway topped by a serpent-flanked sun was not the closest gateway to the temple proper. It constitutes one of the few works of ancient Egyptian architecture that can be seen outside Egypt and the only one of its kind in Spain.

Following remarks made by several Egyptologists criticising the fact that unlike other donated temples, the structure continues to be exposed to the elements, the Madrilenian city council made a unanimous decision to accelerate plans to finally cover the monument in February 2020.

== Gallery ==
Temple of Debod, 2026

Temple of Debod, 2026

Temple of Debod, 2026

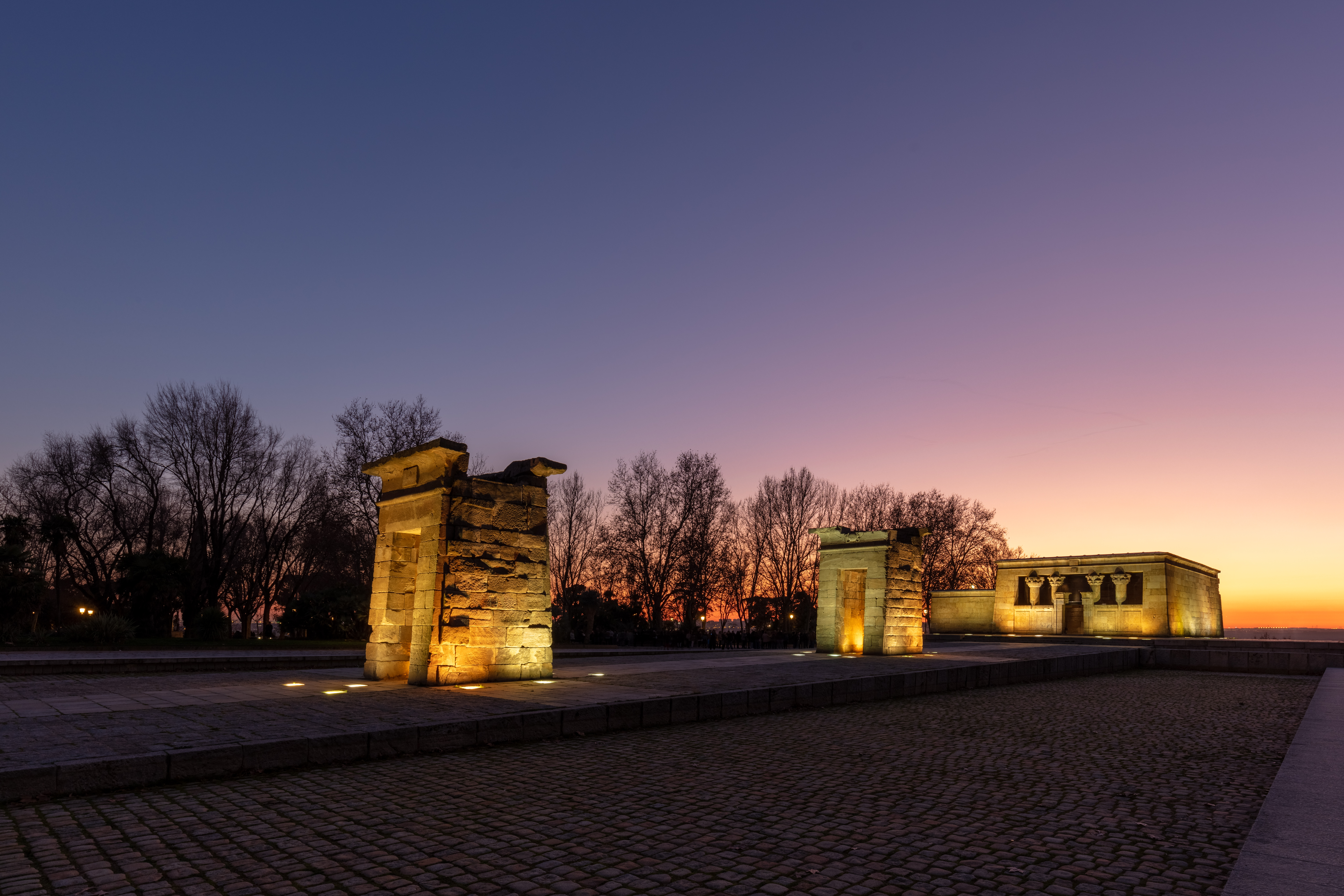
Temple of Debod, 2023

Temple of Debod, 2017

Temple of Debod, 2015

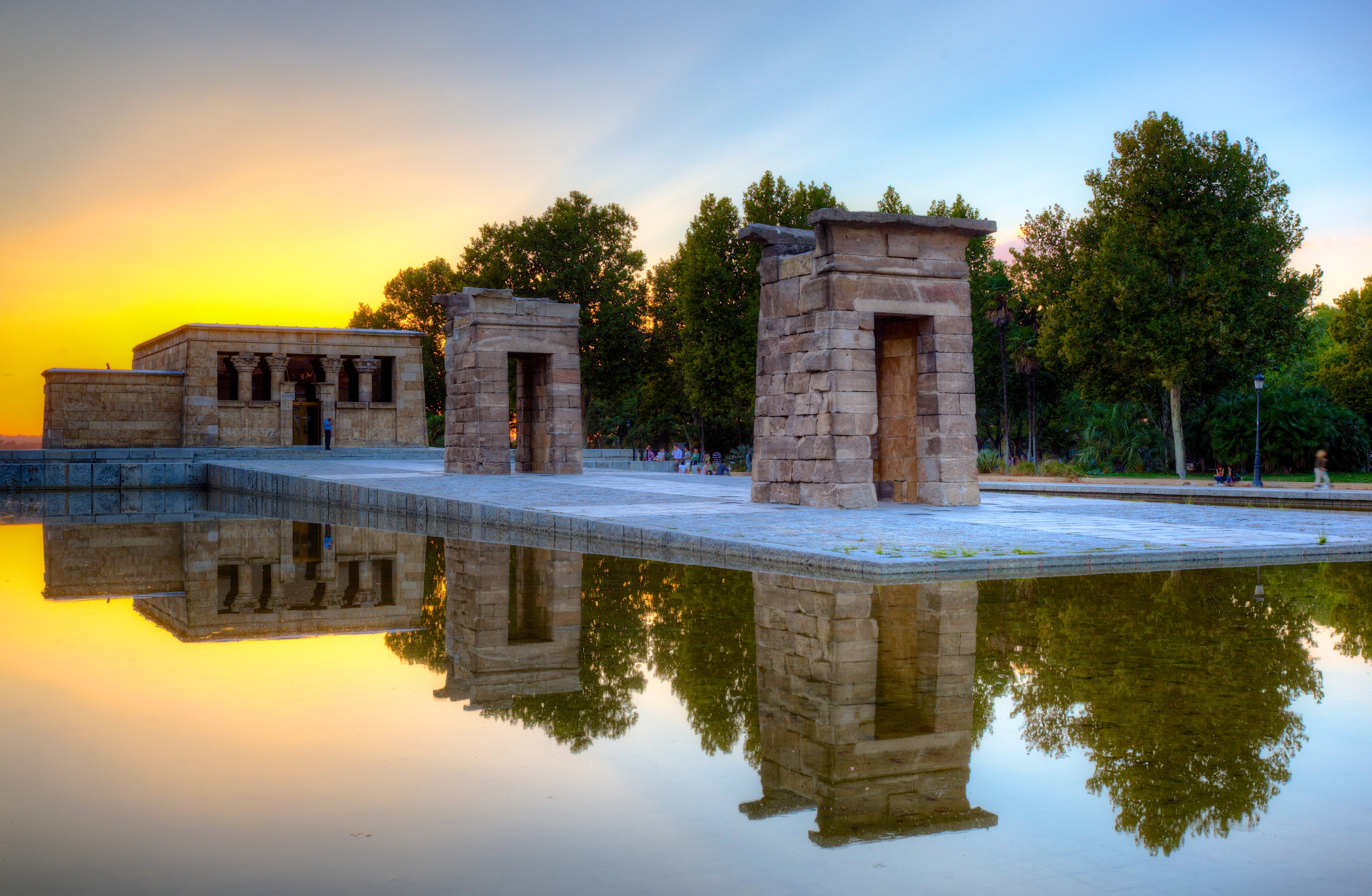
Temple of Debod, 2012

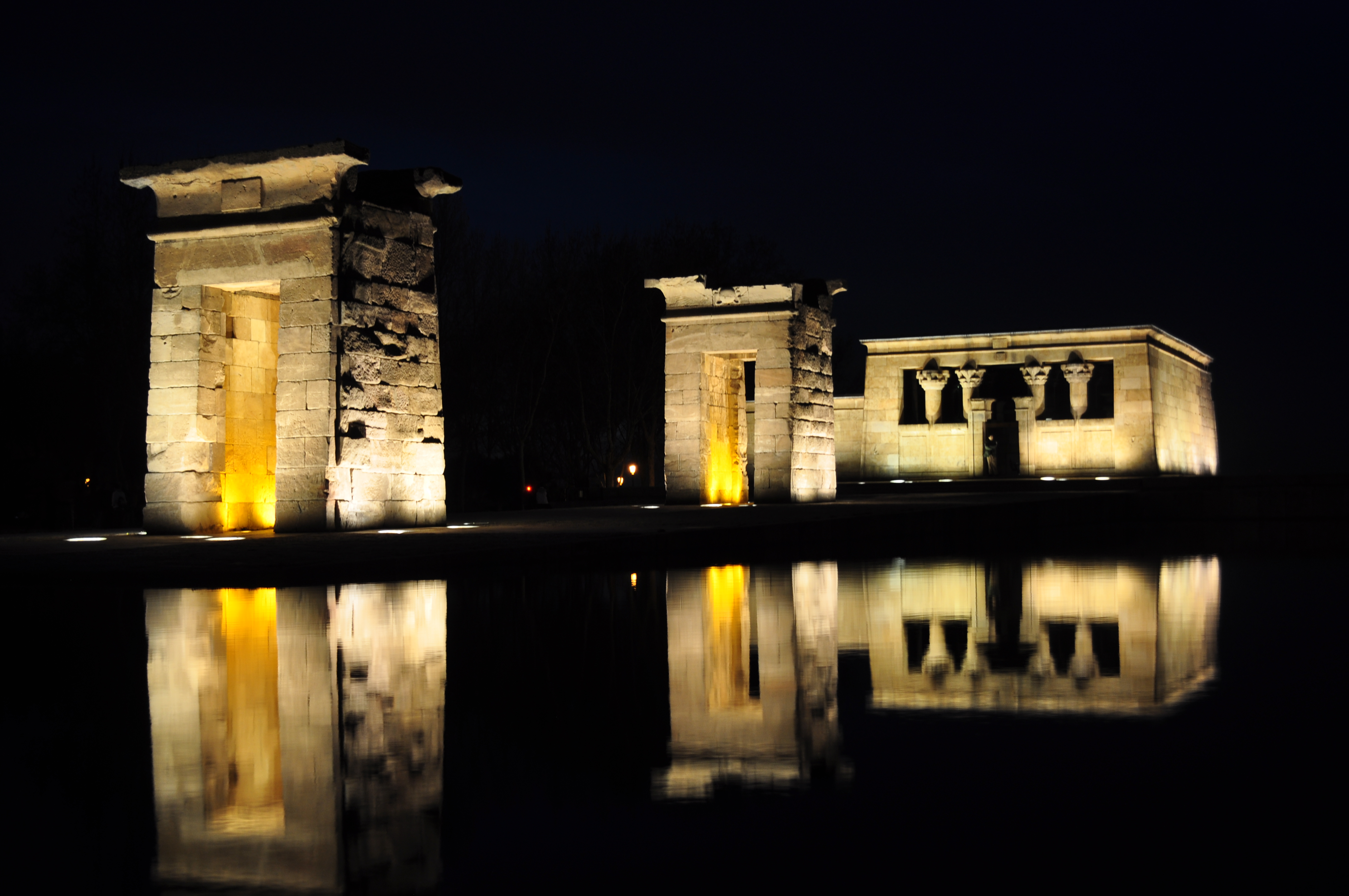
Temple of Debod, 2012

Temple of Debod interior

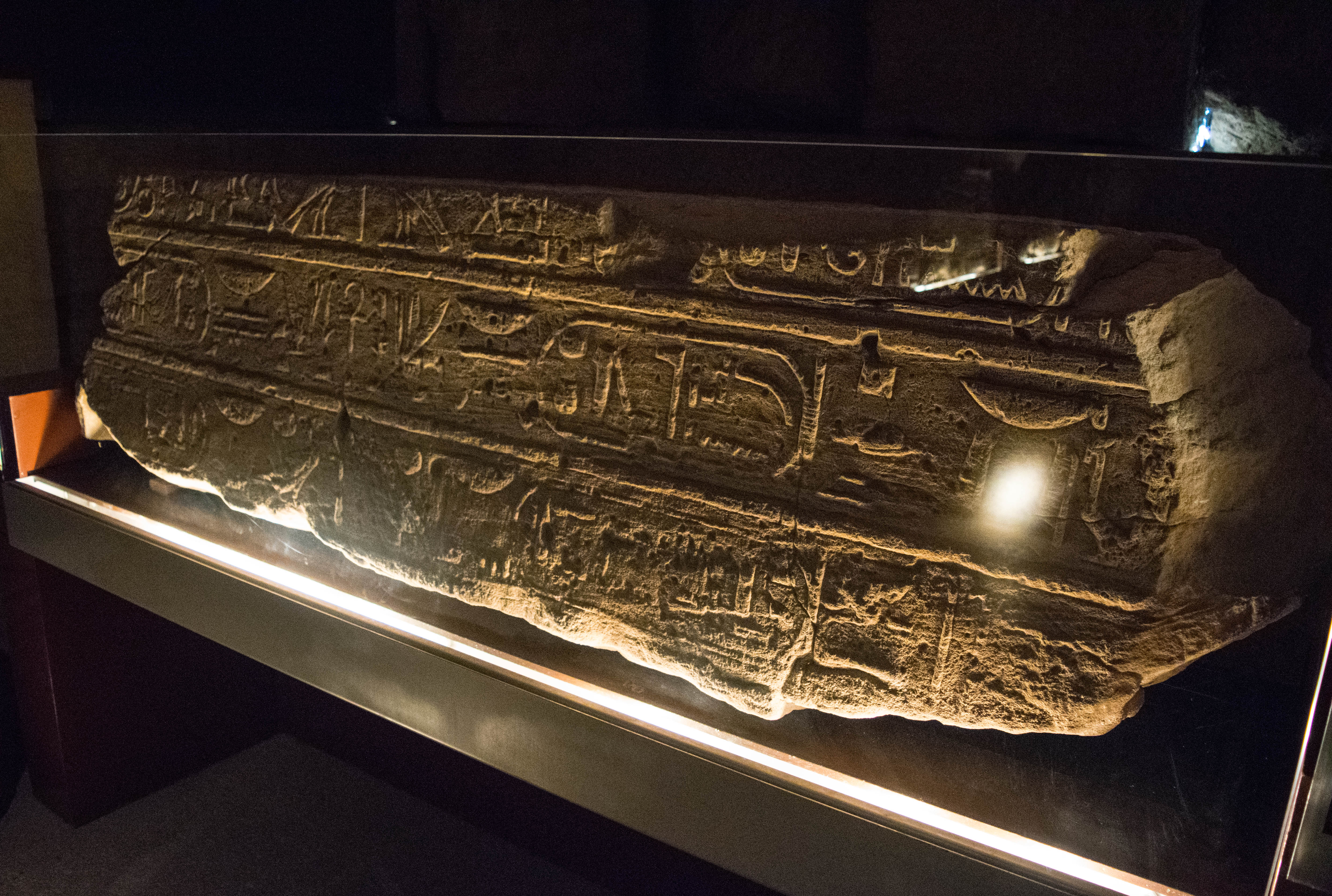
Temple of Debod interior

== See also ==
- Luxor Temple

The four temples donated to countries assisting the relocation are:

- Temple of Debod (Madrid, Spain)
- Temple of Dendur (Metropolitan Museum of Art, New York, United States)
- Temple of Taffeh (Rijksmuseum van Oudheden in Leiden, the Netherlands)
- Temple of Ellesyia (Museo Egizio, Turin, Italy)
