= Madrid =

Capital and largest city of Spain

- Capital city and municipality
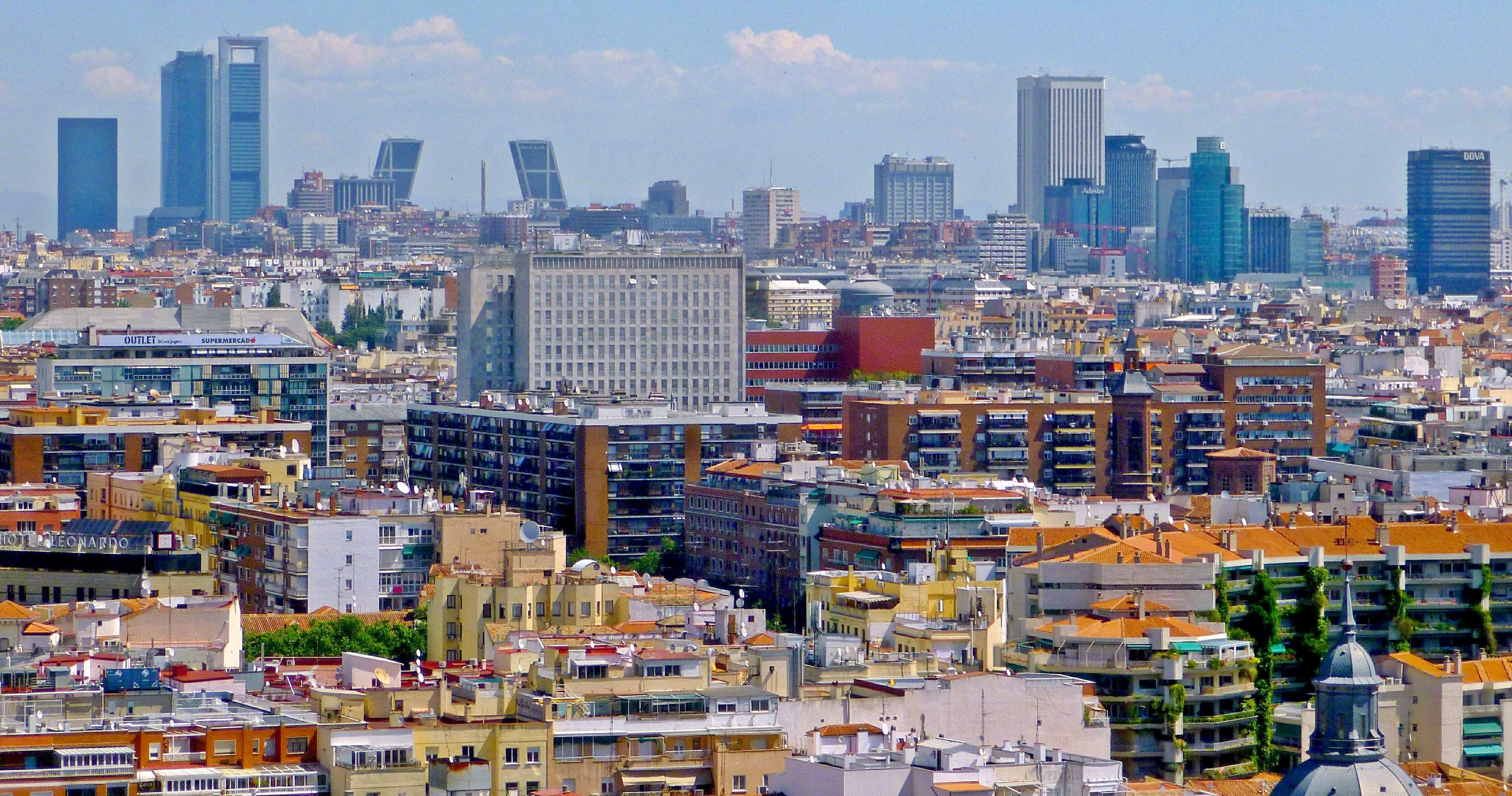
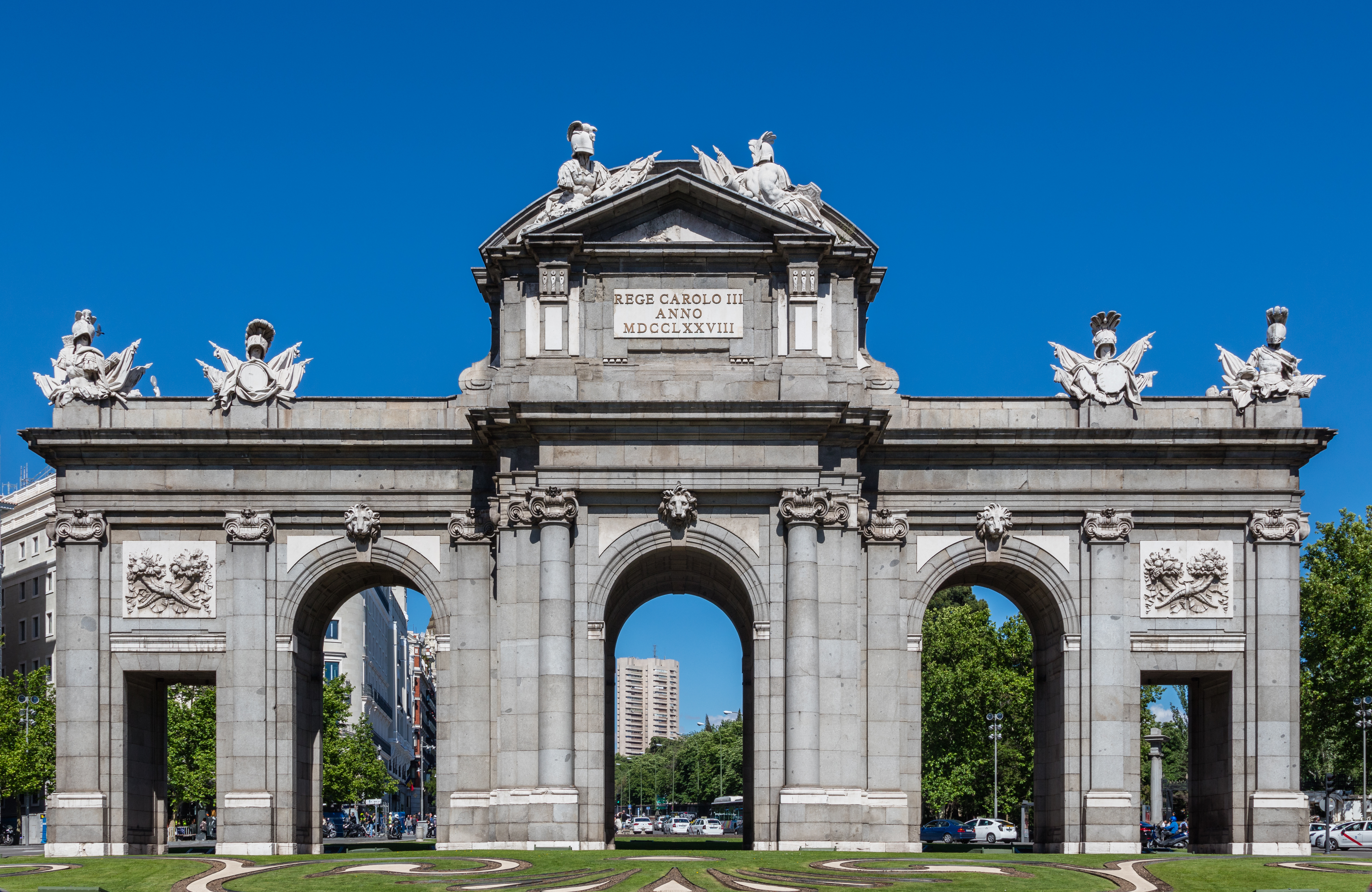
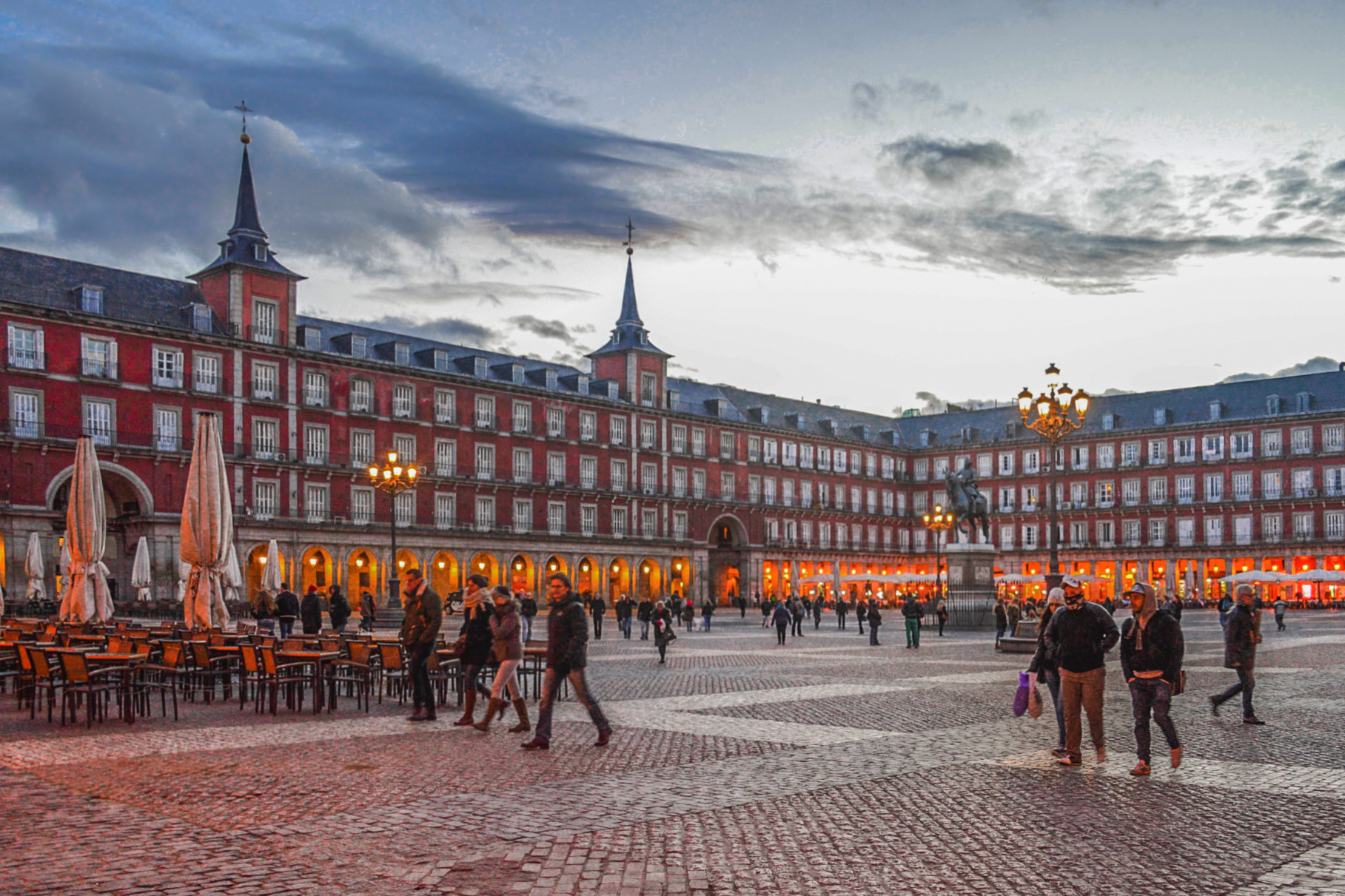
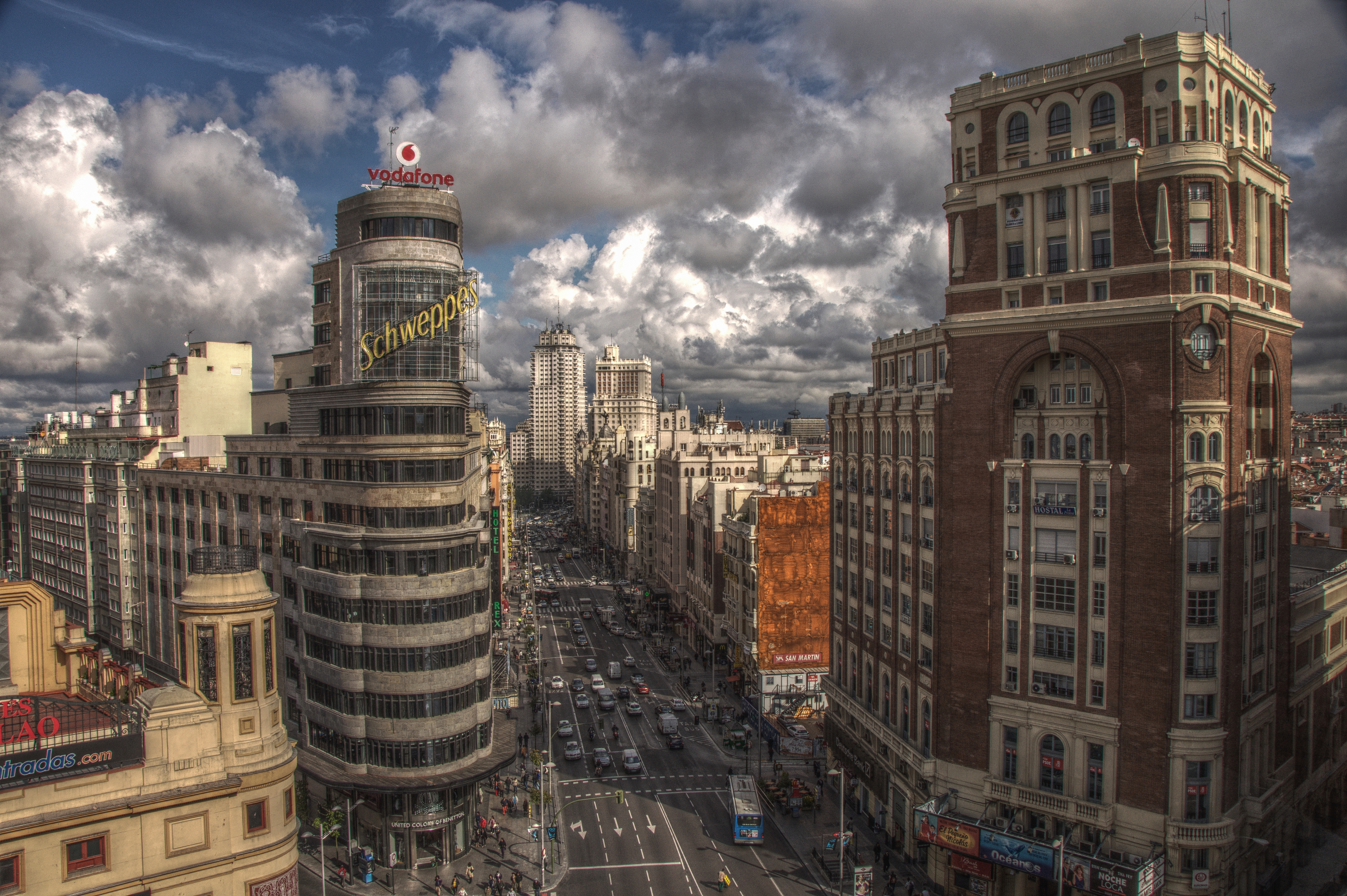
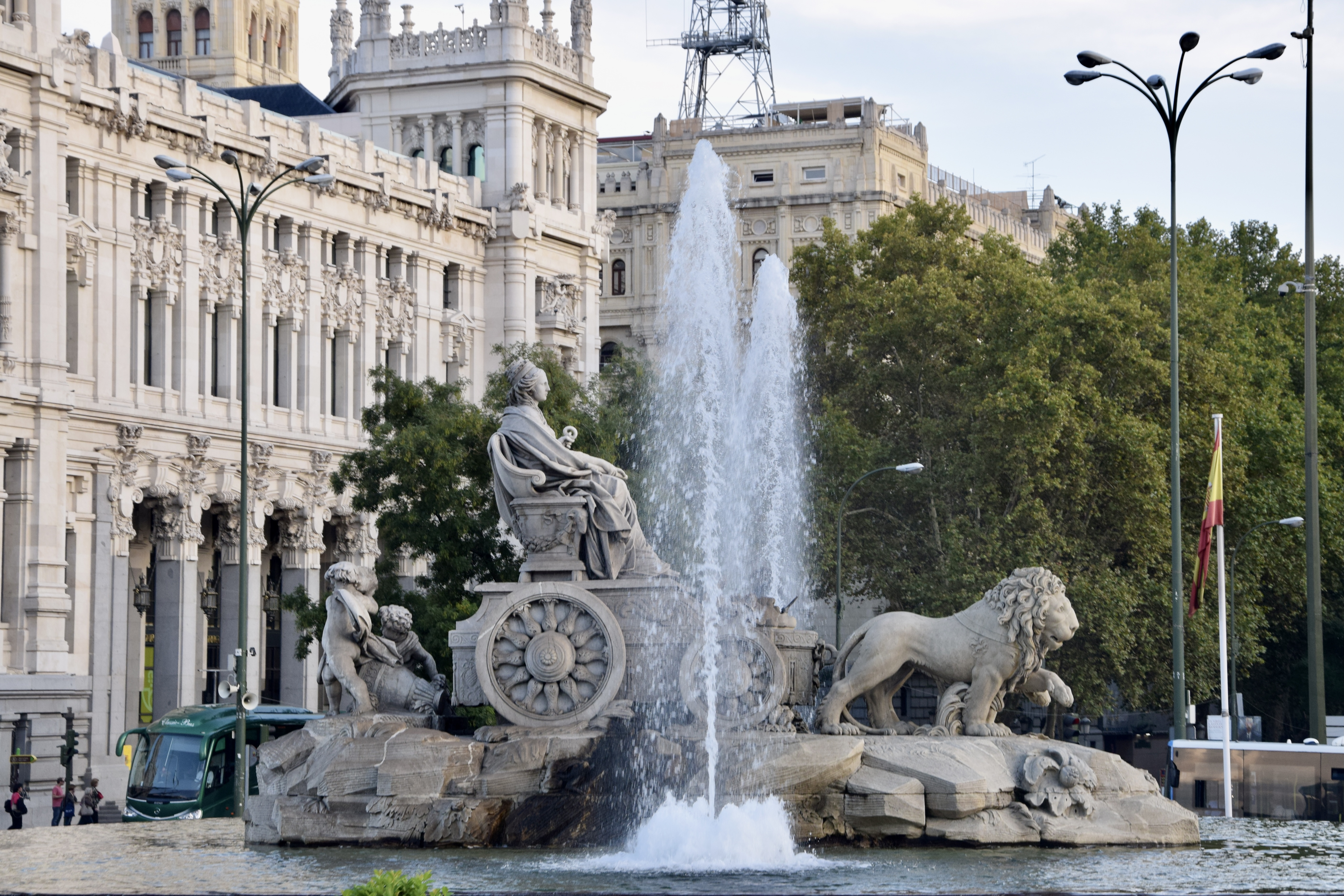
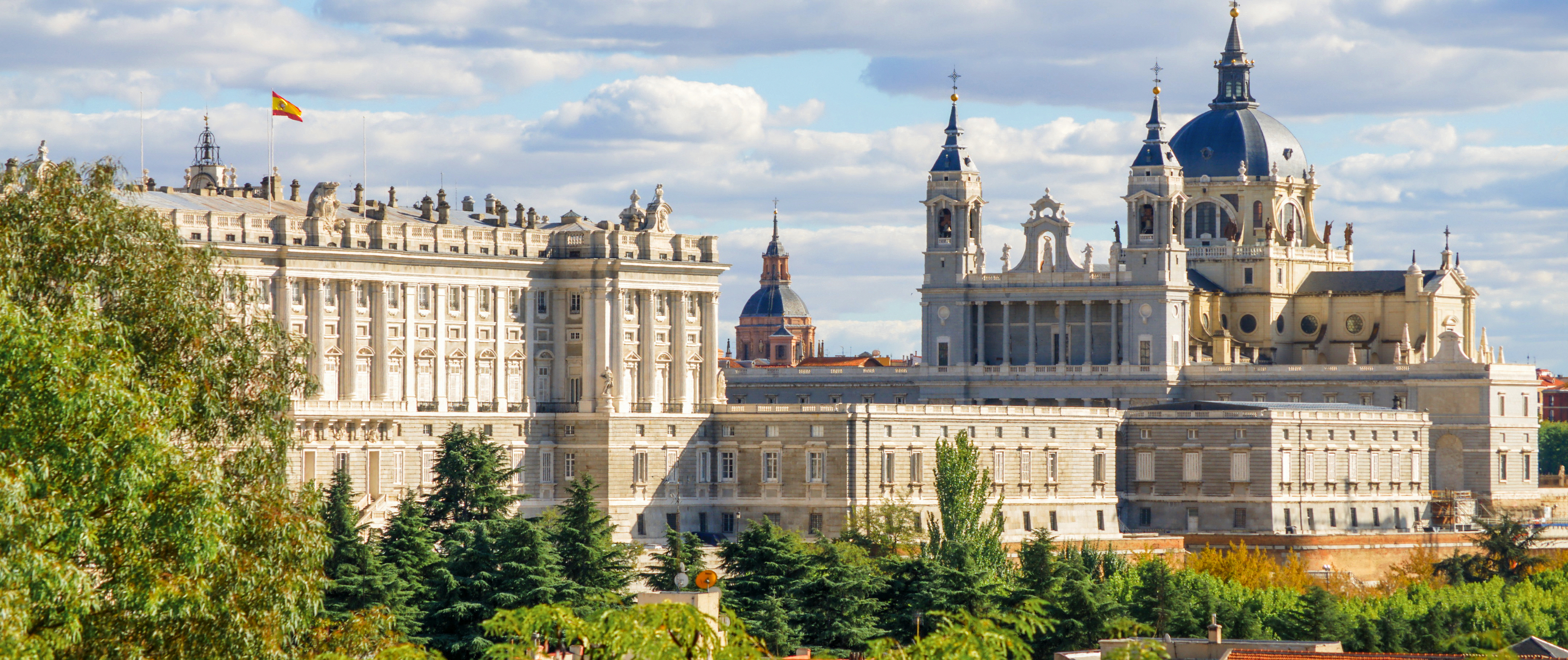
- Skyline of Madrid Puerta de Alcalá Plaza Mayor Gran Vía and Callao Fountain of Cybele The Royal Palace and Almudena Cathedral

- Flag Coat of arms Logo
- Interactive map of Madrid
- Location within Spain Location within Europe
- Coordinates: 40.4169°N 3.7033°W
- Country: Spain
- Autonomous community: Community of Madrid
- Founded: 9th century
- Districts: 21 (list)

Government
  - Type: Ayuntamiento
  - Body: City Council of Madrid
  - Mayor: José Luis Martínez-Almeida (PP)

Area
  - Capital city and municipality: 605.77 km^{2} (233.89 sq mi)
- Elevation: 660 m (2,170 ft)

Population (2025)
  - Capital city and municipality: 3,477,497
  - Rank: 2nd in the European Union; 1st in Spain
  - Density: 5,740.6/km^{2} (14,868/sq mi)
  - Urban: 6,211,000
  - Metro: 6,125,583
- Demonym(s): Madrilenian, Madrilene, madrileño, -ña (Note: Spanish-language demonyms also include the cultism matritense and the colloquial gato, -a ('cat'))

GDP
  - Metro: €316.242 billion (2024)
- Time zone: UTC+1 (CET)
  - Summer (DST): UTC+2 (CEST)
- Postal code: 28001–28080
- Area code: +34 (ES) + 91 (M)
- HDI (2021): 0.940 very high · 1st
- Website: madrid.es

Madrid (Note: English pronunciation: /məˈdrɪd/ mə-DRID, sometimes /məˈdriːd/ mə-DREED; Spanish pronunciation: [maˈðɾið]. Local pronunciations include [maˈðɾi] and [maˈðɾiθ] (particularly the former), both coexisting alongside the standard Spanish pronunciation; although the latter is considered coarse or vulgar, it has been revitalised as a "folksy" pronunciation.) is the capital and largest city of Spain. It had a population of over 3.4 million in the city proper in 2025, and a metropolitan area population of approximately 6.8 million. Madrid is the second-largest city in the European Union (EU), after Berlin, and its metropolitan area is the second-largest in the EU, after Paris. The municipality covers an area of 605.77 square kilometres (233.89 sq mi). Madrid lies on the River Manzanares in the central part of the Iberian Peninsula at about 660 metres (2,170 ft) above mean sea level. The capital city of both Spain and the surrounding autonomous community of Madrid, it is the political, economic and cultural centre of the country.

The primitive core of Madrid, a walled military outpost, dates back to the late 9th century, under the Emirate of Córdoba. Conquered by Christians in 1083 or 1085, it consolidated in the Late Middle Ages as a sizeable town of the Crown of Castile. The development of Madrid as an administrative centre was fostered after 1561, as it became the permanent seat of the court of the Hispanic Monarchy. The following centuries were characterised by the reinforcement of Madrid's status within the framework of a centralised form of state-building.

The Madrid urban agglomeration has the second-largest GDP in the European Union. Madrid is ranked as an alpha world city by the Globalization and World Cities Research Network. The metropolitan area hosts major Spanish companies such as Telefónica, Iberia, BBVA and FCC. It concentrates the bulk of banking operations in Spain and it is the Spanish-speaking city generating the largest number of webpages. Madrid houses the headquarters of UN Tourism, the Ibero-American General Secretariat (SEGIB), the Organization of Ibero-American States (OEI), and the Public Interest Oversight Board (PIOB). Pursuant to the standardising role of the Royal Spanish Academy, Madrid is a centre for Spanish linguistic prescriptivism. Madrid organises fairs such as FITUR, ARCO, SIMO TCI and the Madrid Fashion Week. Madrid is home to football clubs Real Madrid and Atlético Madrid.

Madrid is one of Spain's leading destinations for international tourism. In 2023, it ranked second among Spanish tourist destinations with 5,757,815 international visitors. Madrid's main international source markets include the United States, Italy, France, the United Kingdom and Mexico. Its landmarks include the Plaza Mayor; the Royal Palace of Madrid; the Royal Theatre with its restored 1850 Opera House; the Buen Retiro Park, founded in 1631; the 19th-century National Library building containing some of Spain's historical archives; many national museums; and the UNESCO World heritage "Golden Triangle of Art", located along the Paseo del Prado and comprising three art museums: the Prado Museum; the Reina Sofía Museum, a museum of modern art; and the Thyssen-Bornemisza Museum, which complements the holdings of the other two museums. The mayor is José Luis Martínez-Almeida from the People's Party.

== Etymology ==
The origin of the name is unknown. There are various theories regarding the origin of the toponym "Madrid", all of them with problems when it comes to fully explaining the phonetic evolution of the toponym. The Latin theory (Madrid < Matrice < Matrix) has gained support in the past decades:

- A Celtic origin (Madrid < *Magetoritum; with the root "-ritu" meaning "ford").
- From the Arabic maǧrà / majrā (meaning "water stream") or Arabic: مجريط, romanized: majrīṭ, lit. '"spring", "fountain"'.
- A Mozarabic variant of the Latin matrix, matricis (also meaning "water stream").

Nicknames for Madrid include the plural Los Madriles and La Villa y Corte (lit. 'the town and court').

== History ==
The site of modern-day Madrid has been occupied since prehistoric times. There are archaeological remains of the Celtic Carpetani settlement, Roman villas, a Visigoth basilica near the church of Santa María de la Almudena and three Visigoth necropolises near Casa de Campo, Tetuán and Vicálvaro.

=== Middle Ages ===
The first historical document about the existence of an established settlement in Madrid dates from the Muslim age. In the second half of the 9th century, Umayyad Emir Muhammad I built a fortress on a headland near the river Manzanares as one of the many fortresses he ordered built on the border between Al-Andalus and the kingdoms of León and Castile, with the objective of protecting Toledo from Christian attacks from the North and as a starting point for Muslim offensives. After the disintegration of the Caliphate of Córdoba in the early 11th century, Madrid was integrated in the Taifa of Toledo.

In the context of the wider campaign for the conquest of the taifa of Toledo initiated in 1079, Madrid was seized in 1083 by Alfonso VI of León and Castile, who sought to use the town as an offensive outpost against the city of Toledo, in turn conquered in 1085. Following the conquest, Christians occupied the centre of the city, while Muslims and Jews were displaced to the suburbs. Madrid, located near Alcalá (under Muslim control until 1118), remained a borderland for a while, suffering a number of razzias during the Almoravid period, and its walls were destroyed in 1110.

Madrid was confirmed as villa de realengo (linked to the Crown) in 1123, during the reign of Alfonso VII. The 1123 Charter of Otorgamiento established the first explicit limits between Madrid and Segovia, namely the Puerto de El Berrueco and the Puerto de Lozoya. Beginning in 1188, Madrid had the right to be a city with representation in the courts of Castile. In 1202, Alfonso VIII gave Madrid its first charter to regulate the municipal council, which was expanded in 1222 by Ferdinand III. The government system of the town was changed to a regimiento of 12 regidores by Alfonso XI in January 1346.

Starting in the mid-13th century and up to the late 14th century, the concejo of Madrid vied for the control of the Real de Manzanares territory against the concejo of Segovia, a powerful town north of the Sierra de Guadarrama mountain range, characterised by its repopulating prowess and its animal husbandry-based economy, in contrast to the agricultural and less repopulated town of Madrid. After the decline of Sepúlveda, another concejo north of the mountain range, Segovia became a major actor south of the Guadarrama mountains, expanding across the Lozoya and Manzanares rivers to the north of Madrid and along the Guadarrama river course to its west.

In 1309, the Courts of Castile convened at Madrid for the first time under Ferdinand IV, and later in 1329, 1339, 1391, 1393, 1419 and twice in 1435.

=== Early Modern Era ===
During the revolt of the Comuneros, led by Juan López de Padilla, Madrid joined the revolt against Charles, Holy Roman Emperor. After defeat at the Battle of Villalar, Madrid was besieged and occupied by the imperial troops. The city was however granted the titles of Coronada (Crowned) and Imperial.

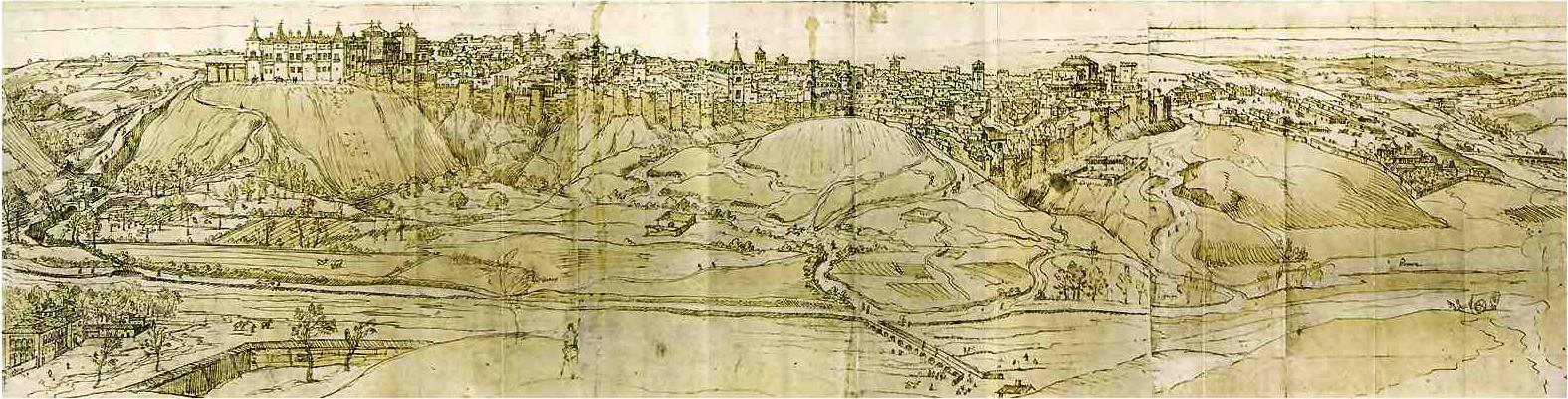
A view of Madrid from the west, facing the Puerta de la Vega. Drawing by Anton van den Wyngaerde, 1562.

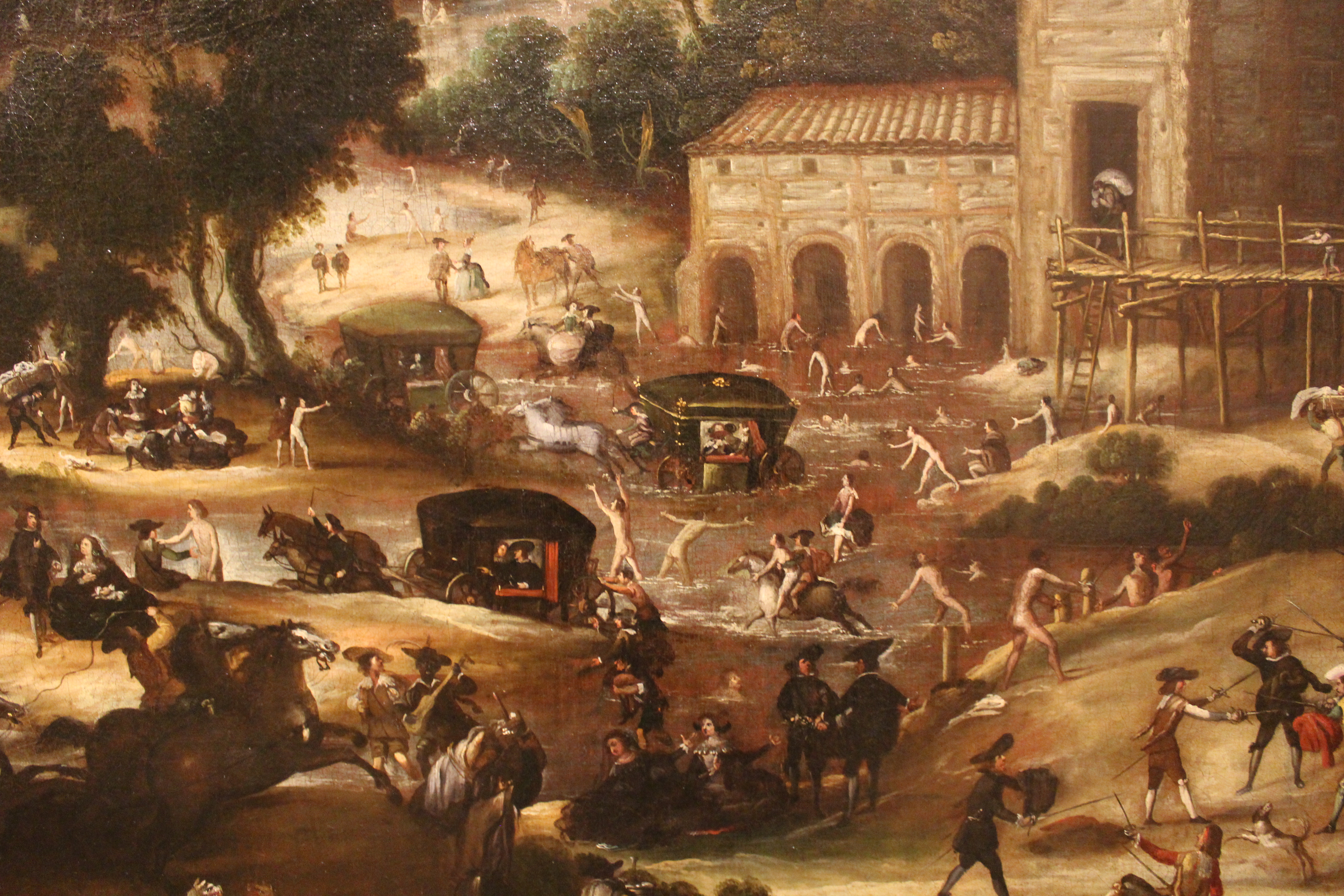
Baths in the Manzanares in the place of Molino Quemado (detail), by Félix Castello (c. 1634–1637)

The number of urban inhabitants grew from 4,060 in 1530 to 37,500 in 1594. The poor population of the court was composed of ex-soldiers, foreigners, and rogues, dissatisfied with the lack of food and high prices. In June 1561 Phillip II set his court in Madrid, installing it in the old alcázar. Thanks to this, Madrid became the political centre of the monarchy, being the capital of Spain except for a short period between 1601 and 1606, in which the Court was relocated to Valladolid, and the Madrid population temporarily plummeted. Being the capital was decisive for the evolution of the city and influenced its fate. During the rest of the reign of Philip II, the population boomed, going up from about 18,000 in 1561 to 80,000 in 1598.

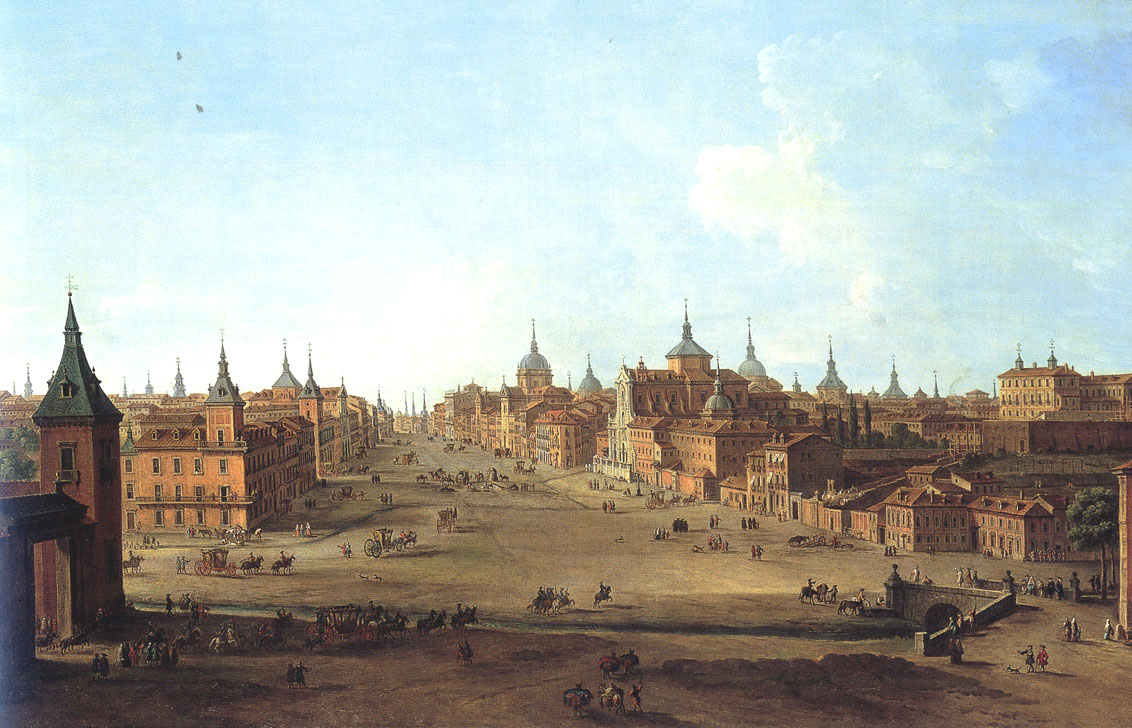
The Calle de Alcalá in 1750 by Antonio Joli

In the early 17th century, although Madrid recovered from the loss of its capital status, with the return of diplomats, lords and affluent people, as well as an entourage of noted writers and artists together with them, extreme poverty remained rampant. The century also was a time of heyday for theatre, represented in the so-called corrales de comedias.

Madrid changed hands several times during the War of the Spanish Succession: from the Bourbon control it passed to the allied "Austracist" army with Portuguese and English presence that entered the city in late June 1706, only to be retaken by the Bourbon army on 4 August 1706. The Habsburg army led by the Archduke Charles entered the city for a second time in September 1710, leaving the city less than three months after. Philip V entered the capital on 3 December 1710.

Seeking to take advantage of Madrid's location at the geographic centre of Spain, the 18th century saw a sustained effort to create a radial system of communications and transports for the country through public investments.

Philip V built the Royal Palace, the Royal Tapestry Factory and the main Royal Academies. The reign of Charles III, who came to be known as "the best mayor of Madrid", saw an effort to turn the city into a true capital, with the construction of sewers, street lighting, cemeteries outside the city and a number of monuments and cultural institutions. The reforms enacted by his Sicilian minister were however opposed in 1766 by the populace in the so-called Esquilache Riots, a revolt demanding to repeal a clothing decree banning the use of traditional hats and long cloaks aiming to curb crime in the city.

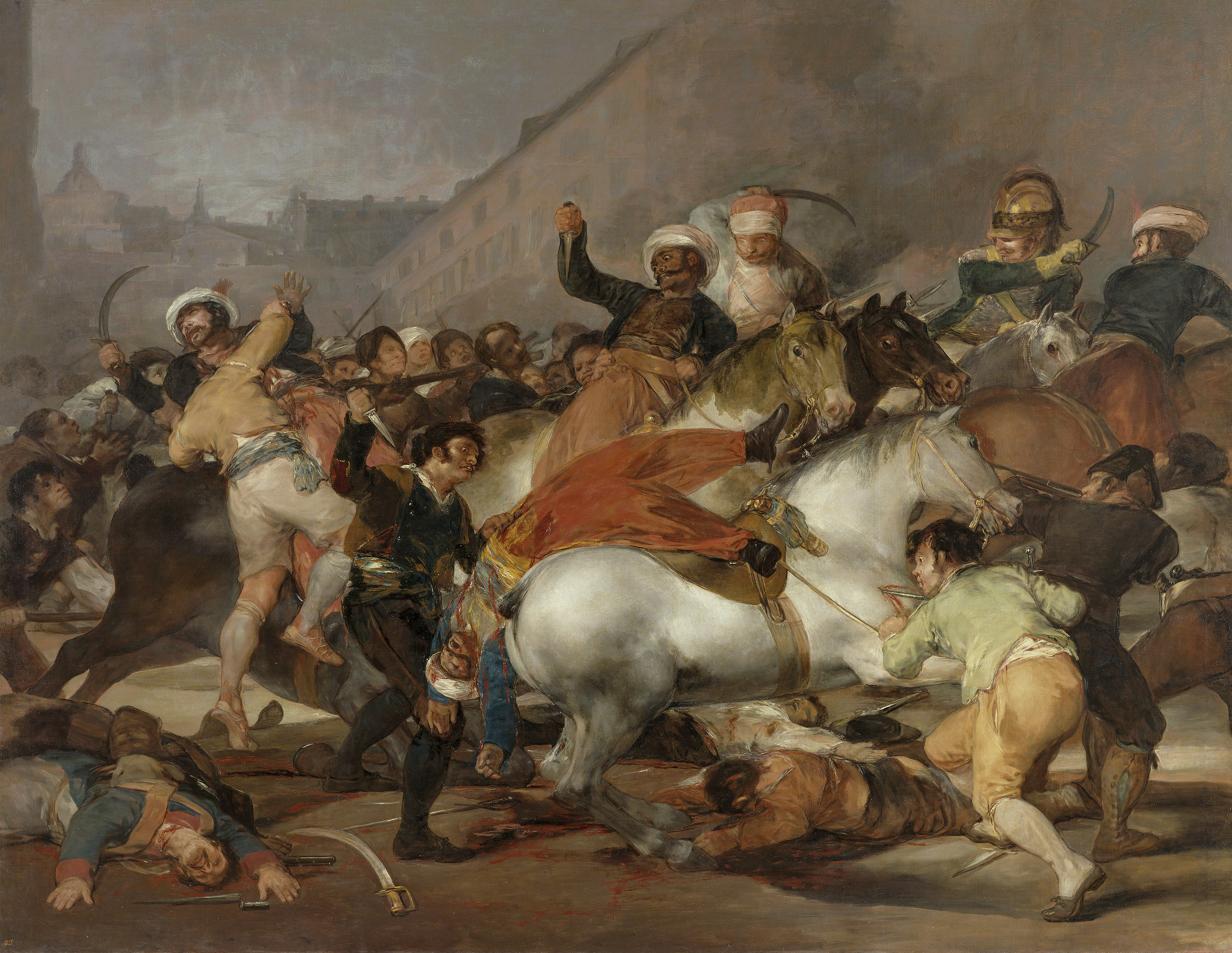
The Second of May 1808 by Francisco de Goya

In the context of the Peninsular War, the situation in French-occupied Madrid after March 1808 was becoming more and more tense. On 2 May, a crowd began to gather near the Royal Palace protesting against the French attempt to evict the remaining members of the Bourbon royal family to Bayonne, prompting an uprising against the French Imperial troops that lasted hours and spread throughout the city, including a famous last stand at the Monteleón barracks. Subsequent repression was brutal, with many insurgent Spaniards being summarily executed. The uprising led to a declaration of war calling all the Spaniards to fight against the French invaders.

=== Capital of the Liberal State ===
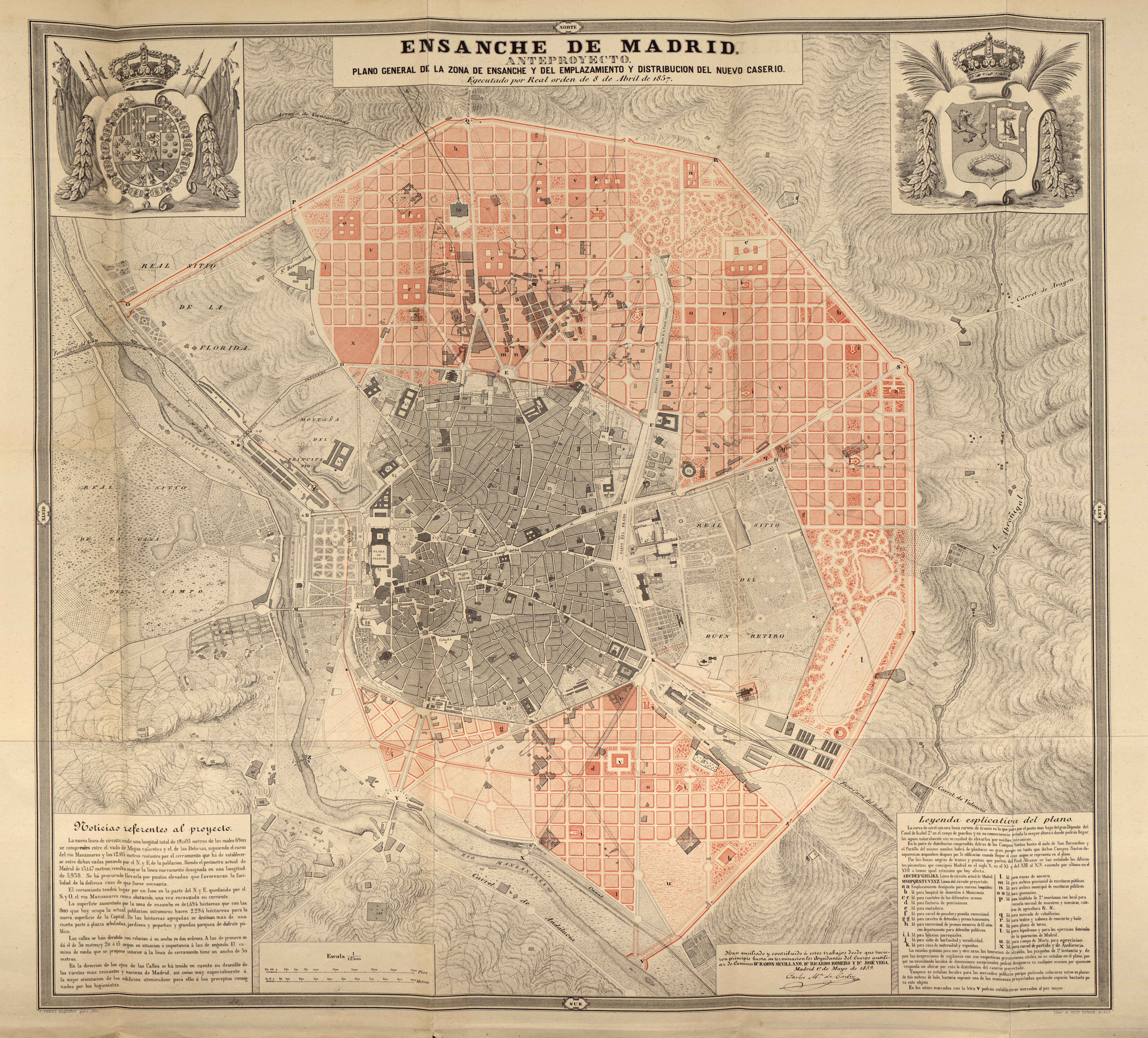
An 1861 map of the Ensanche de Madrid

Madrid was invaded on 24 May 1823 by a French army—the so-called Hundred Thousand Sons of Saint Louis—called to intervene to restore the absolutism of Ferdinand that the latter had been deprived from during the 1820–1823 trienio liberal. Unlike other European capitals, during the first half of the 19th century the only noticeable bourgeois elements in Madrid (that experienced a delay in its industrial development up to that point) were merchants. The University of Alcalá de Henares was relocated to Madrid in 1836, becoming the Central University.

Madrid's economy modernised during the second half of the 19th century, consolidating its status as a service and financial centre. New industries were mostly focused in book publishing, construction and low-tech sectors. The introduction of railway transport greatly helped Madrid's economic prowess, and led to changes in consumption patterns, such as the substitution of salted fish for fresh fish from the Spanish coasts, and further strengthening Madrid's role as a logistics node in Spain's distribution network. Electric lighting in the streets was introduced in the 1890s.

During the first third of the 20th century the population nearly doubled, reaching more than 850,000 inhabitants. New suburbs such as Las Ventas, Tetuán and El Carmen became the homes of the influx of workers, while Ensanche became a middle-class neighbourhood of Madrid.

=== Second Republic and Civil War ===
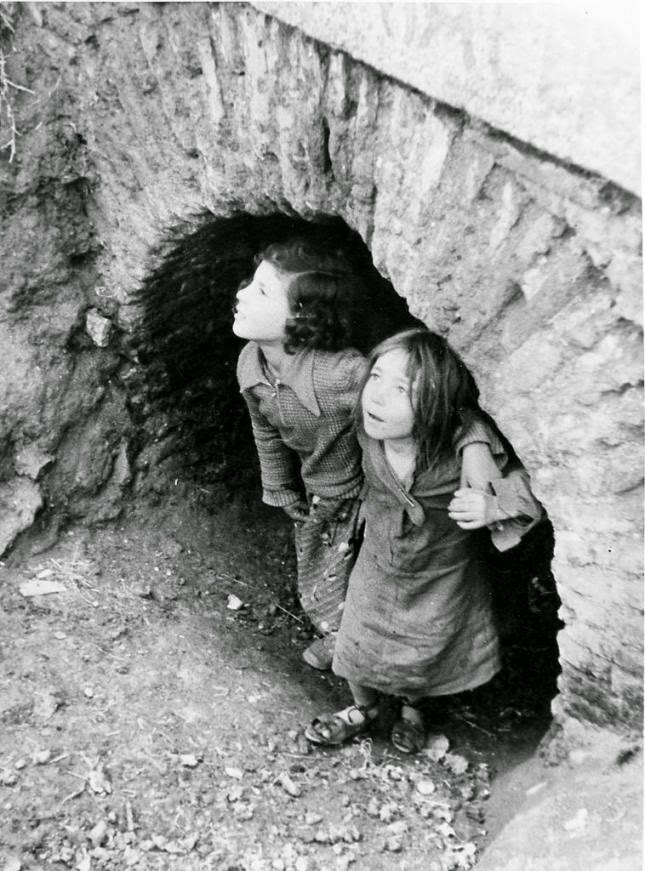
Children taking refuge during the Francoist bombings (1936–1937) over Madrid during the Spanish Civil War

The Spanish Constitution of 1931 was the first to legislate the location of the country's capital, setting it explicitly in Madrid. During the 1930s, Madrid enjoyed "great vitality"; it was demographically young, becoming urbanised and the centre of new political movements. During this time, major construction projects were undertaken, including the northern extension of the Paseo de la Castellana, one of Madrid's major thoroughfares. The tertiary sector, including banking, insurance and telephone services, grew greatly. Illiteracy rates were down to below 20%, and the city's cultural life grew notably during the so-called Silver Age of Spanish Culture; the sales of newspapers also increased.

The proclamation of the Republic created a severe housing shortage. Slums and squalor grew due to high population growth and the influx of the poor to the city. Construction of affordable housing failed to keep pace and increased political instability discouraged economic investment in housing in the years immediately prior to the Civil War. Anti-clericalism and Catholicism lived side by side in Madrid; the burning of convents initiated after riots in the city in May 1931 worsened the political environment. However, the 1934 insurrection largely failed in the city.

Madrid was one of the most heavily affected cities in the Spanish Civil War (1936–1939). It was a stronghold of the Republican faction from July 1936 and became an international symbol of anti-fascist struggle during the conflict. The city suffered aerial bombing, and in November 1936, its western suburbs were the scene of an all-out battle. The city fell to the Francoists in March 1939.

=== Francoist dictatorship ===
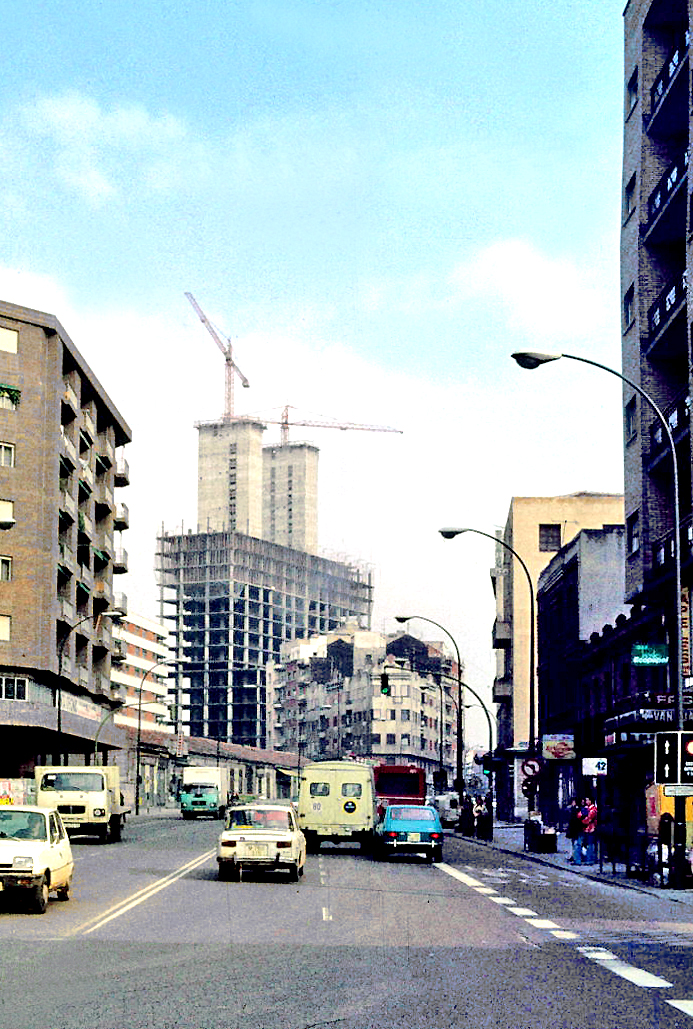
The calle de Bravo Murillo in 1978

A staple of post-war Madrid (Madrid de la posguerra) was the widespread use of ration coupons. Meat and fish consumption was scarce, resulting in high mortality due to malnutrition. Due to Madrid's history as a left-wing stronghold, the right-wing victors considered moving the capital elsewhere (most notably to Seville), but such plans were never implemented. The Franco regime instead emphasised the city's history as the capital of formerly imperial Spain.

The intense demographic growth experienced by Madrid via mass immigration from the rural areas of Spain led to the construction of abundant housing in the peripheral areas of Madrid to absorb the new population, initially comprising substandard housing. This increased wealth polarisation in Madrid, with as many as 50,000 shacks scattered around Madrid by 1956. A transitional planning intended to temporarily replace the shanty towns were the poblados de absorción, introduced since the mid-1950s in locations such as Canillas, San Fermín, Caño Roto, Villaverde, Pan Bendito, Zofío and Fuencarral, aiming to work as a sort of "high-end" shacks (with the destinataries participating in the construction of their own housing) but under the aegis of a wider coordinated urban planning.

Madrid grew through the annexation of neighbouring municipalities, achieving the present extent of 607 km^{2} (234.36 sq mi). The south of Madrid became heavily industrialised, and there was significant immigration from rural areas of Spain. Madrid's newly built north-western districts became the home of a newly enriched middle class that appeared as result of the 1960s Spanish economic boom, while the south-eastern periphery became a large working-class area, which formed the base for active cultural and political movements.

=== Recent history ===
After the fall of the Francoist regime, the new 1978 constitution confirmed Madrid as the capital of Spain. The 1979 municipal election brought Madrid's first democratically elected mayor since the Second Republic to power.

Madrid was the scene of some of the most important events of the time, such as the mass demonstrations of support for democracy after the failed coup, 23-F, on 23 February 1981. The first democratic mayors belonged to the centre-left PSOE (Enrique Tierno Galván, Juan Barranco Gallardo). Since the late 1970s and through the 1980s Madrid became the centre of the cultural movement known as la Movida. Conversely, just like in the rest of the country, a heroin crisis took a toll in the poor neighbourhoods of Madrid in the 1980s.

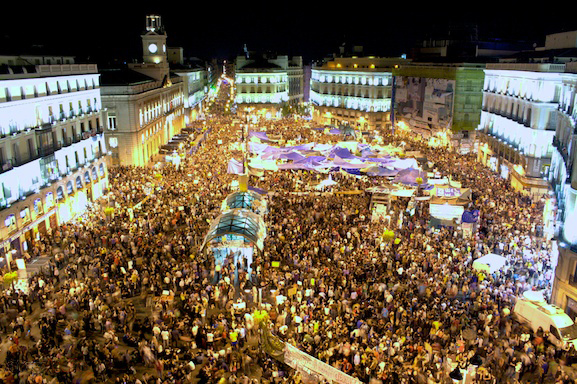
2011 Anti-austerity protests in the Puerta del Sol

Benefiting from increasing prosperity in the 1980s and 1990s, the capital city of Spain consolidated its position as an important economic, cultural, industrial, educational, and technological centre on the European continent. During the mandate as Mayor of José María Álvarez del Manzano construction of traffic tunnels below the city proliferated. The following administrations, also conservative, led by Alberto Ruiz-Gallardón and Ana Botella launched three unsuccessful bids for the 2012, 2016 and 2020 Summer Olympics. In 2005, Madrid was the leading European destination for migrants from developing countries, as well as the largest employer of non-European workforce in Spain.

In the early years of the 21st century, Madrid experienced the increase of income inequality and socio-economic segregation. Madrid was a centre of the anti-austerity protests that erupted in Spain in 2011. As consequence of the spillover of the 2008 financial and mortgage crisis, Madrid has been affected by the increasing number of second-hand homes held by banks and house evictions. The mandate of left-wing Mayor Manuela Carmena (2015–2019) delivered the renaturalization of the course of the Manzanares across the city.

Since the late 2010s, the challenges the city faces include the increasingly unaffordable rental prices (often in parallel with the gentrification and the spike of tourist apartments in the city centre) and the profusion of betting shops in working-class areas, leading to an "epidemic" of gambling among young people.

== Geography ==
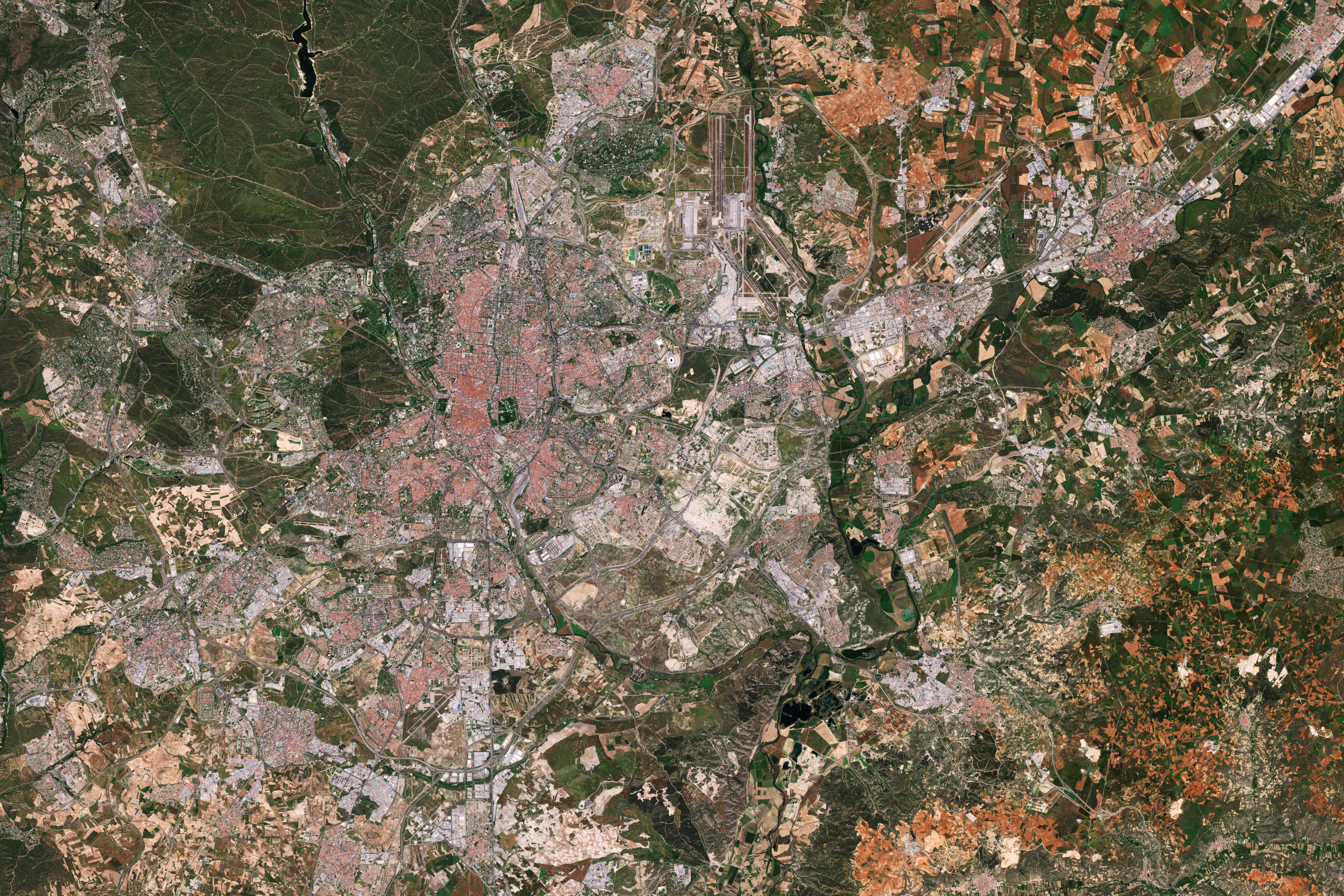
Madrid as seen by the Sentinel-2 satellite, July 2022

Madrid lies in the centre of the Iberian peninsula on the southern Meseta Central, 60 kilometres south of the Guadarrama mountain range and straddling the Jarama and Manzanares river sub-drainage basins, in the wider Tagus River catchment area. With an average altitude of 650 metres (2,130 ft), Madrid is the second-highest capital of Europe, after Andorra la Vella. The difference in altitude within the city proper ranges from the 700 m (2,297 ft) around Plaza de Castilla in the north of city to the 570 m (1,870 ft) around La China wastewater treatment plant on the Manzanares' riverbanks, near the latter's confluence with the Fuente Castellana thalweg in the south of the city.

The Monte de El Pardo, a protected forested area covering over a quarter of the municipality, reaches its top altitude (843 m (2,766 ft)) on its perimeter, in the slopes surrounding El Pardo reservoir located at the north-western end of the municipality, in the Fuencarral-El Pardo district.

The oldest urban core is located on the hills next to the left bank of the Manzanares River. Madrid grew to the east, reaching the Fuente Castellana Creek, now the Paseo de la Castellana, and further east reaching the Abroñigal Creek, now the M-30. Madrid also grew through the annexation of neighbouring urban settlements, including those to the South West on the right bank of the Manzanares.

=== Parks and forests ===
Main parks in the municipality

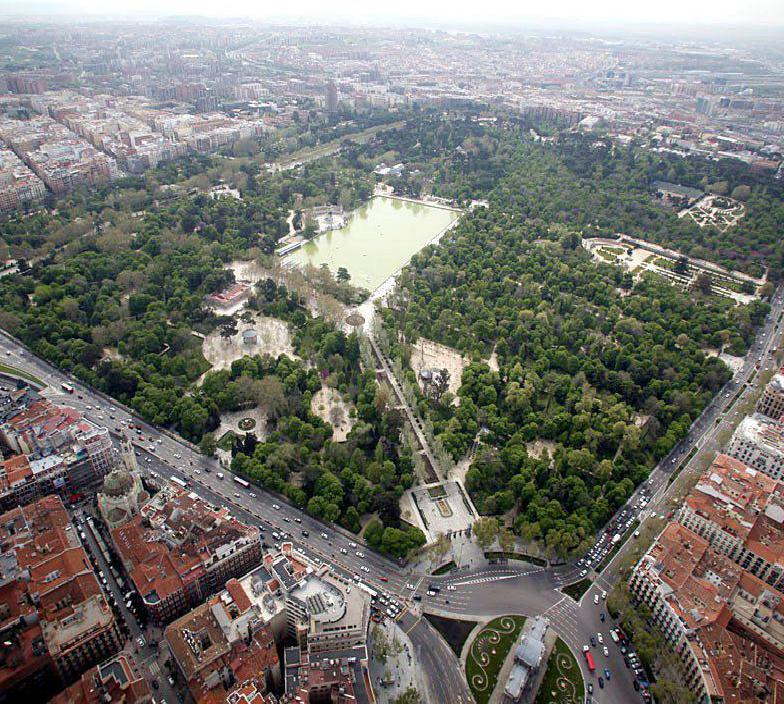
Retiro Park

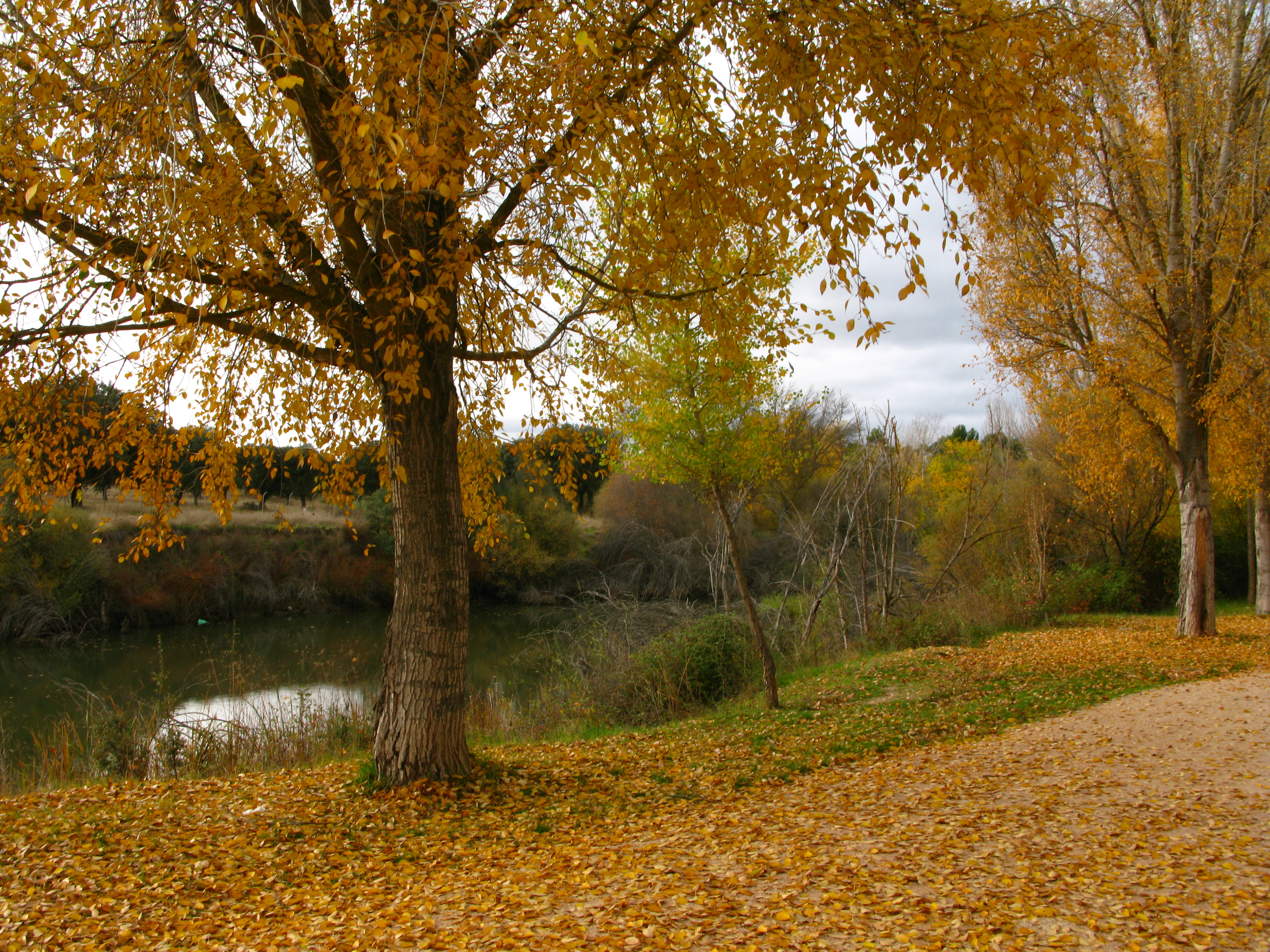
The Manzanares flowing through the Monte de El Pardo

Madrid has the second highest number of aligned trees in the world, with 248,000 units, only exceeded by Tokyo. Madrid's citizens have access to a green area within a 15-minute walk. Since 1997, green areas have increased by 16%. At present, 8.2% of Madrid's grounds are green areas, meaning that there are 16 square metres (172 sq ft) of green area per inhabitant, far exceeding the ten-square-metre (110 sq ft) per inhabitant recommended by the World Health Organization.

A great bulk of the most important parks in Madrid are related to areas originally belonging to the royal assets (including El Pardo, Soto de Viñuelas, Casa de Campo, El Buen Retiro, la Florida and the Príncipe Pío hill, and the Queen's Casino). The other main source for the "green" areas are the bienes de propios owned by the municipality (including the Dehesa de la Villa, the Dehesa de Arganzuela or Viveros).

El Retiro is the most visited location of the city. Having an area bigger than 1.4 square kilometres (350 acres; 140 hectares; 0.54 sq mi), it is the largest park within the Almendra Central, the inner part of the city enclosed by the M-30. Created during the reign of Philip IV (17th century), it was handed over to the municipality in 1868, after the Glorious Revolution. It lies next to the Royal Botanical Garden of Madrid.

Located northwest of the city centre, the Parque del Oeste ("Park of the West") comprises part of the area of the former royal possession of the "Real Florida", and it features a slope as the height decreases down to the Manzanares. Its southern extension includes the Temple of Debod, a transported ancient Egyptian temple.

Other urban parks are the Parque de El Capricho, the Parque Juan Carlos I (both in northeast Madrid), Madrid Río, the Enrique Tierno Galván Park, the San Isidro Park as well as gardens such as the Campo del Moro (opened to the public in 1978) and the Sabatini Gardens (opened to the public in 1931) adjacent to the Royal Palace.

Further west, across the Manzanares, lies the Casa de Campo, a large forested area with more than 1,700 hectares (17 km^{2}; 4,200 acres) where the Madrid Zoo, and the Parque de Atracciones de Madrid amusement park are located. It was ceded to the municipality following the proclamation of the Second Spanish Republic in 1931.

The Monte de El Pardo is the largest forested area in the municipality. A holm oak forest covering a surface over 16,000 hectares, it is considered the best preserved mediterranean forest in the Community of Madrid and one of the best preserved in Europe. Already mentioned in the Alfonso XI's Libro de la montería from the mid-14th century, its condition as hunting location linked to the Spanish monarchy help to preserve the environmental value. During the reign of Ferdinand VII the regime of hunting prohibition for the Monte de El Pardo became one of full property and the expropriation of all possessions within its bounds was enforced, with dire consequences for the madrilenians at the time. It is designated as Special Protection Area for bird-life and it is also part of the Regional Park of the High Basin of the Manzanares.

Other large forested areas include the Soto de Viñuelas, the Dehesa de Valdelatas and the Dehesa de la Villa. As of 2015, the most recent big park in the municipality is the Valdebebas Park. Covering a total area of 4.7 km^{2} (1.8 sq mi), it is sub-divided in a 3.4-square-kilometre (1.3 sq mi) forest park (the Parque forestal de Valdebebas-Felipe VI), a 0.8-square-kilometre (0.31 sq mi) periurban park as well as municipal garden centres and compost plants.

=== Climate ===
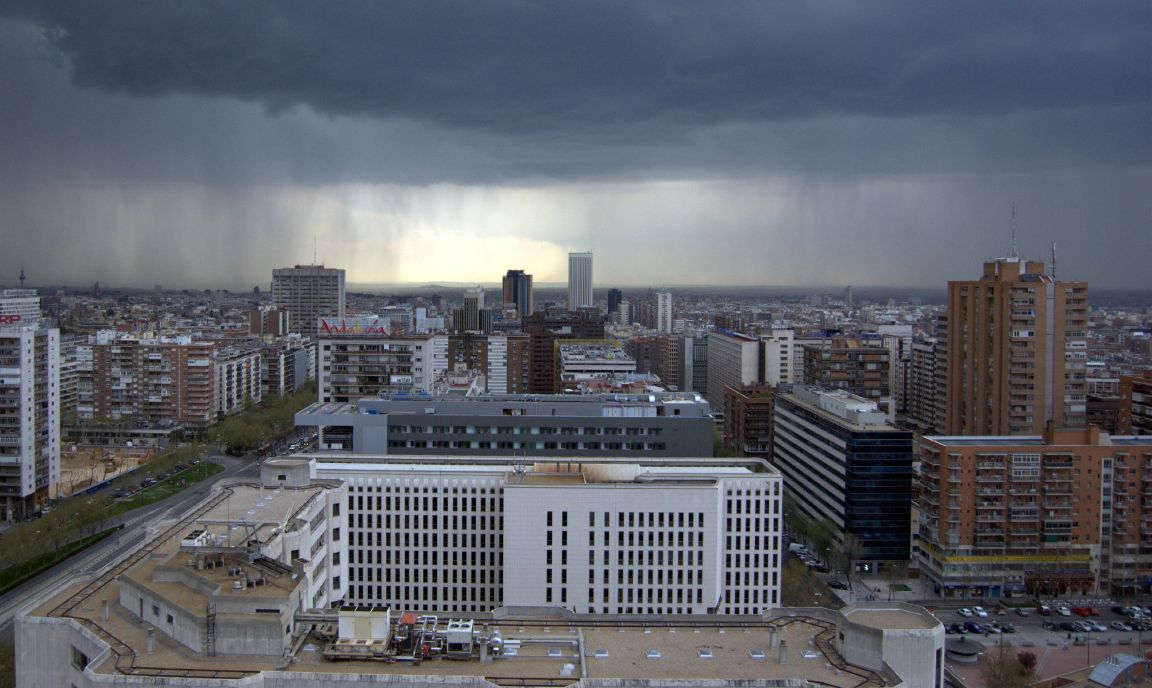
Madrid during a rainstorm in spring

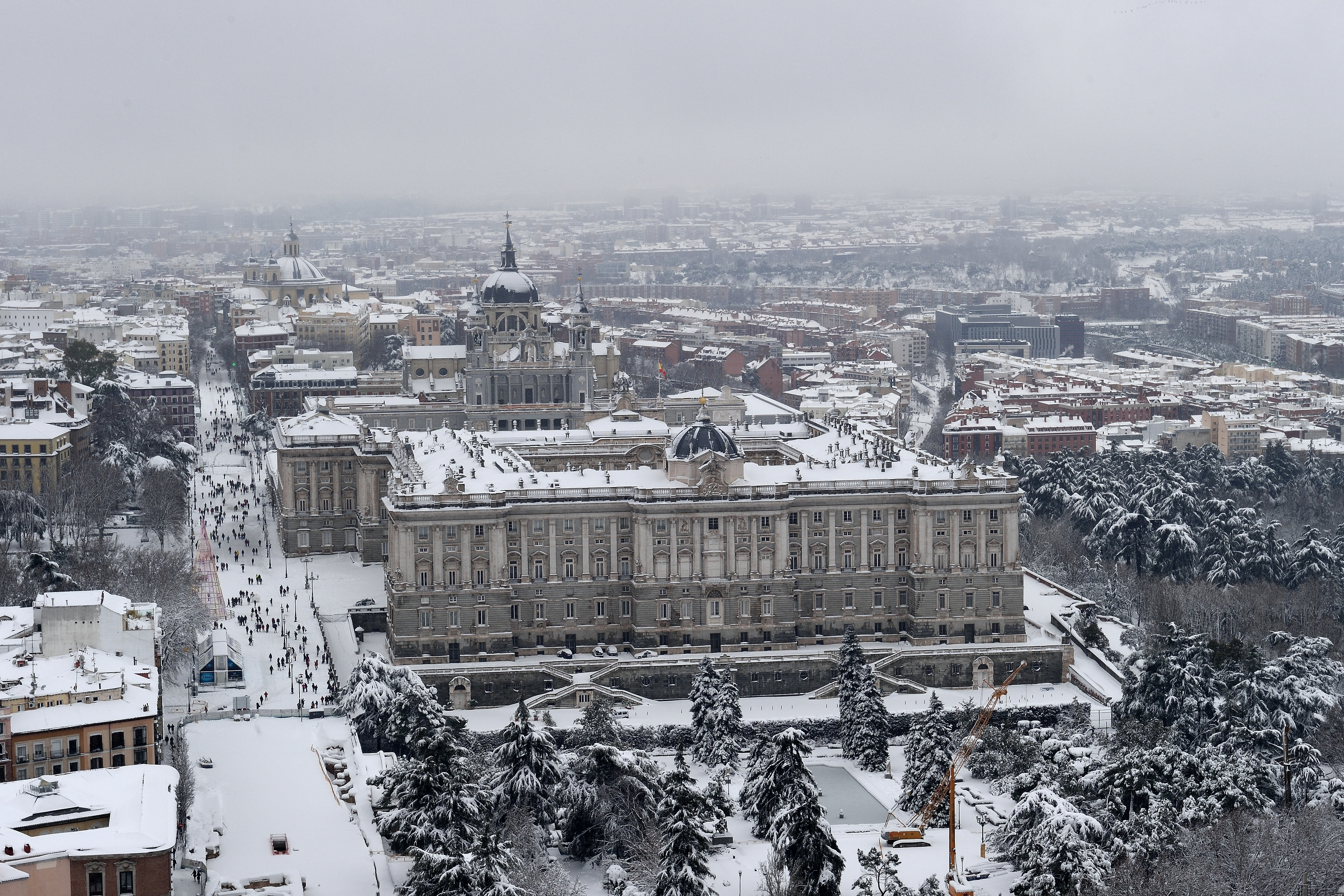
The Royal Palace of Madrid under snow, during the Filomena snow storm

Madrid has a cold semi-arid climate (Köppen BSk), transitioning to a Mediterranean climate (Csa) in the western half. Madrid's climate has continental influences.

Winters are cool due to its altitude, which is approximately 667 m (2,188 ft) above sea level and distance from the moderating effect of the sea. While mostly sunny, rain, sporadic snowfalls and frequent frosts can occur between December and February with cooler temperatures particularly during the night and mornings as cold winds blow into Madrid from surrounding mountains. Summers are hot and sunny. In the warmest month, July, average daytime temperatures range from 32 to 34 °C (90 to 93 °F) depending on location, with maxima commonly climbing over 35 °C (95 °F) and occasionally up to 40 °C during the frequent heat waves. Due to Madrid's altitude and dry climate, humidity is low. Diurnal ranges are often significant, particularly on sunny winter days when the temperature rises in the afternoon before rapidly plummeting after nightfall. Madrid is among the sunniest capital cities in Europe.

The highest recorded temperature in central Madrid's Retiro Park was on 14 August 2021, with 40.7 °C (105.3 °F). The lowest recorded temperature was on 16 January 1945 with −10.1 °C (13.8 °F) in Madrid. At the airport, on the eastern side of Madrid, the highest recorded temperature was on 14 August 2021, at 42.7 °C (108.9 °F). The lowest recorded temperature was on 16 January 1945 at −15.2 °C (4.6 °F). From 7 to 9 January 2021, Madrid received the most snow in its recorded history since 1904; Spain's meteorological agency AEMET reported between 50 and 60 cm (20 and 24 in) of accumulated snow in its weather stations within the city.

Precipitation is typically concentrated in the autumn, winter, and spring. It is particularly sparse during the summer, taking the form of about two showers and/or thunderstorms during the season. Madrid is the European capital with the least amount of annual precipitation.

At the metropolitan scale, Madrid features both substantial daytime urban cool island and nighttime urban heat island effects during the summer season in relation to its surroundings, which feature thinly vegetated dry land.

Climate data for Madrid (667 m), Buen Retiro Park in the city centre (1991–2020 normals, sunshine 1981–2010, extremes 1920–present)
Month	Jan	Feb	Mar	Apr	May	Jun	Jul	Aug	Sep	Oct	Nov	Dec	Year
Record high °C (°F)	19.9 (67.8)	22.0 (71.6)	26.7 (80.1)	30.9 (87.6)	35.5 (95.9)	40.7 (105.3)	40.7 (105.3)	40.7 (105.3)	38.9 (102.0)	30.1 (86.2)	22.7 (72.9)	18.6 (65.5)	40.7 (105.3)
Mean maximum °C (°F)	15.3 (59.5)	18.1 (64.6)	23.1 (73.6)	26.2 (79.2)	30.8 (87.4)	35.8 (96.4)	37.5 (99.5)	37.2 (99.0)	32.7 (90.9)	26.1 (79.0)	19.4 (66.9)	15.3 (59.5)	38.2 (100.8)
Mean daily maximum °C (°F)	10.0 (50.0)	12.2 (54.0)	16.2 (61.2)	18.9 (66.0)	23.2 (73.8)	28.9 (84.0)	32.8 (91.0)	32.0 (89.6)	26.5 (79.7)	19.7 (67.5)	13.5 (56.3)	10.3 (50.5)	20.3 (68.6)
Daily mean °C (°F)	6.5 (43.7)	8.0 (46.4)	11.3 (52.3)	13.6 (56.5)	17.5 (63.5)	22.8 (73.0)	26.2 (79.2)	25.7 (78.3)	21.0 (69.8)	15.4 (59.7)	10.0 (50.0)	7.0 (44.6)	15.4 (59.8)
Mean daily minimum °C (°F)	3.0 (37.4)	3.7 (38.7)	6.3 (43.3)	8.2 (46.8)	11.9 (53.4)	16.5 (61.7)	19.5 (67.1)	19.3 (66.7)	15.5 (59.9)	11.1 (52.0)	6.4 (43.5)	3.7 (38.7)	10.4 (50.8)
Mean minimum °C (°F)	−1.7 (28.9)	−0.9 (30.4)	0.9 (33.6)	3.0 (37.4)	6.1 (43.0)	10.6 (51.1)	14.1 (57.4)	13.9 (57.0)	10.0 (50.0)	5.9 (42.6)	1.1 (34.0)	−1.2 (29.8)	−2.8 (27.0)
Record low °C (°F)	−10.1 (13.8)	−9.1 (15.6)	−5.1 (22.8)	−1.6 (29.1)	0.6 (33.1)	4.4 (39.9)	8.5 (47.3)	9.2 (48.6)	4.0 (39.2)	−0.4 (31.3)	−3.4 (25.9)	−9.2 (15.4)	−10.1 (13.8)
Average precipitation mm (inches)	32.0 (1.26)	34.0 (1.34)	35.0 (1.38)	46.0 (1.81)	48.0 (1.89)	20.0 (0.79)	9.0 (0.35)	10.0 (0.39)	24.0 (0.94)	64.0 (2.52)	52.0 (2.05)	42.0 (1.65)	416 (16.37)
Average precipitation days (≥ 1 mm)	5.5	5.1	5.4	6.7	6.8	3.3	1.5	1.5	3.5	7.2	6.7	5.9	59.1
Average relative humidity (%) (daily average)	72.0	64.0	57.0	56.0	54.0	45.0	39.0	42.0	51.0	66.0	72.0	75.0	57.8
Mean monthly sunshine hours	149	158	211	230	268	315	355	332	259	199	144	124	2,744
Source: Agencia Estatal de Meteorología

Climate data for Madrid Barajas Airport (1991–2020 normals, extremes 1945–present)
Month	Jan	Feb	Mar	Apr	May	Jun	Jul	Aug	Sep	Oct	Nov	Dec	Year
Record high °C (°F)	20.9 (69.6)	24.5 (76.1)	27.1 (80.8)	32.5 (90.5)	36.5 (97.7)	41.2 (106.2)	42.2 (108.0)	42.7 (108.9)	40.2 (104.4)	33.2 (91.8)	24.7 (76.5)	21.3 (70.3)	42.7 (108.9)
Mean maximum °C (°F)	16.7 (62.1)	19.3 (66.7)	23.8 (74.8)	27.0 (80.6)	31.9 (89.4)	37.1 (98.8)	38.7 (101.7)	38.5 (101.3)	34.1 (93.4)	27.7 (81.9)	21.2 (70.2)	16.8 (62.2)	39.6 (103.3)
Mean daily maximum °C (°F)	11.0 (51.8)	13.2 (55.8)	16.9 (62.4)	19.4 (66.9)	24.0 (75.2)	30.1 (86.2)	33.9 (93.0)	33.3 (91.9)	27.9 (82.2)	21.3 (70.3)	14.8 (58.6)	11.3 (52.3)	21.4 (70.6)
Daily mean °C (°F)	5.8 (42.4)	7.2 (45.0)	10.4 (50.7)	12.9 (55.2)	17.0 (62.6)	22.3 (72.1)	25.6 (78.1)	25.3 (77.5)	20.6 (69.1)	15.2 (59.4)	9.6 (49.3)	6.4 (43.5)	14.9 (58.7)
Mean daily minimum °C (°F)	0.6 (33.1)	1.2 (34.2)	3.8 (38.8)	6.3 (43.3)	10.0 (50.0)	14.5 (58.1)	17.3 (63.1)	17.2 (63.0)	13.3 (55.9)	9.1 (48.4)	4.3 (39.7)	1.4 (34.5)	8.3 (46.8)
Mean minimum °C (°F)	−5.2 (22.6)	−4.3 (24.3)	−1.7 (28.9)	0.5 (32.9)	3.8 (38.8)	8.9 (48.0)	12.2 (54.0)	11.9 (53.4)	7.5 (45.5)	2.5 (36.5)	−2.2 (28.0)	−4.8 (23.4)	−6.5 (20.3)
Record low °C (°F)	−15.2 (4.6)	−14.8 (5.4)	−6.6 (20.1)	−4.0 (24.8)	−0.5 (31.1)	3.9 (39.0)	7.0 (44.6)	7.4 (45.3)	1.9 (35.4)	−2.4 (27.7)	−7.4 (18.7)	−10.5 (13.1)	−15.2 (4.6)
Average precipitation mm (inches)	28.1 (1.11)	29.5 (1.16)	32.5 (1.28)	39.1 (1.54)	40.8 (1.61)	20.3 (0.80)	9.1 (0.36)	10.0 (0.39)	25.4 (1.00)	57.1 (2.25)	47.3 (1.86)	34.3 (1.35)	373.5 (14.71)
Average precipitation days (≥ 1 mm)	5.2	4.2	4.8	6.4	6.1	3.3	1.3	1.4	2.9	6.9	6.3	5.5	54.3
Average relative humidity (%)	73	65	58	55	50	39	32	34	45	62	71	76	55
Mean monthly sunshine hours	152	175	223	234	273	324	372	341	264	205	153	136	2,852
Percentage possible sunshine	50	58	60	58	61	72	81	80	70	59	51	47	62
Source: Agencia Estatal de Meteorología

Climate data for Madrid Cuatro Vientos (1991–2020 normals, extremes 1945–present)
Month	Jan	Feb	Mar	Apr	May	Jun	Jul	Aug	Sep	Oct	Nov	Dec	Year
Record high °C (°F)	20.6 (69.1)	23.0 (73.4)	27.0 (80.6)	31.8 (89.2)	36.1 (97.0)	40.5 (104.9)	41.5 (106.7)	42.2 (108.0)	39.5 (103.1)	32.2 (90.0)	24.2 (75.6)	19.6 (67.3)	42.2 (108.0)
Mean daily maximum °C (°F)	10.7 (51.3)	12.8 (55.0)	16.5 (61.7)	19.1 (66.4)	23.7 (74.7)	29.6 (85.3)	33.4 (92.1)	32.8 (91.0)	27.5 (81.5)	20.8 (69.4)	14.4 (57.9)	11.1 (52.0)	21.0 (69.9)
Daily mean °C (°F)	6.4 (43.5)	7.8 (46.0)	10.9 (51.6)	13.2 (55.8)	17.4 (63.3)	22.7 (72.9)	26.1 (79.0)	25.7 (78.3)	21.1 (70.0)	15.6 (60.1)	10.0 (50.0)	7.0 (44.6)	15.3 (59.6)
Mean daily minimum °C (°F)	2.0 (35.6)	2.7 (36.9)	5.3 (41.5)	7.4 (45.3)	11.1 (52.0)	15.8 (60.4)	18.8 (65.8)	18.6 (65.5)	14.7 (58.5)	10.3 (50.5)	5.5 (41.9)	2.8 (37.0)	9.6 (49.2)
Record low °C (°F)	−13.0 (8.6)	−11.4 (11.5)	−5.6 (21.9)	−4.0 (24.8)	−1.2 (29.8)	1.5 (34.7)	5.0 (41.0)	4.0 (39.2)	2.0 (35.6)	−1.5 (29.3)	−4.0 (24.8)	−10.3 (13.5)	−13.0 (8.6)
Average precipitation mm (inches)	33.3 (1.31)	35.4 (1.39)	34.7 (1.37)	44.2 (1.74)	44.0 (1.73)	19.4 (0.76)	8.4 (0.33)	10.8 (0.43)	25.7 (1.01)	62.2 (2.45)	51.5 (2.03)	42.5 (1.67)	412.1 (16.22)
Average precipitation days (≥ 1 mm)	5.4	5.2	5.4	6.8	6.3	2.8	1.4	1.4	3.5	7.1	6.5	5.9	57.7
Average relative humidity (%)	74	65	58	56	51	41	35	38	49	65	73	76	57
Mean monthly sunshine hours	161	184	220	246	295	333	372	344	258	208	165	146	2,932
Percentage possible sunshine	53	61	59	62	66	74	81	81	68	60	55	51	64
Source: Agencia Estatal de Meteorología

=== Water supply ===
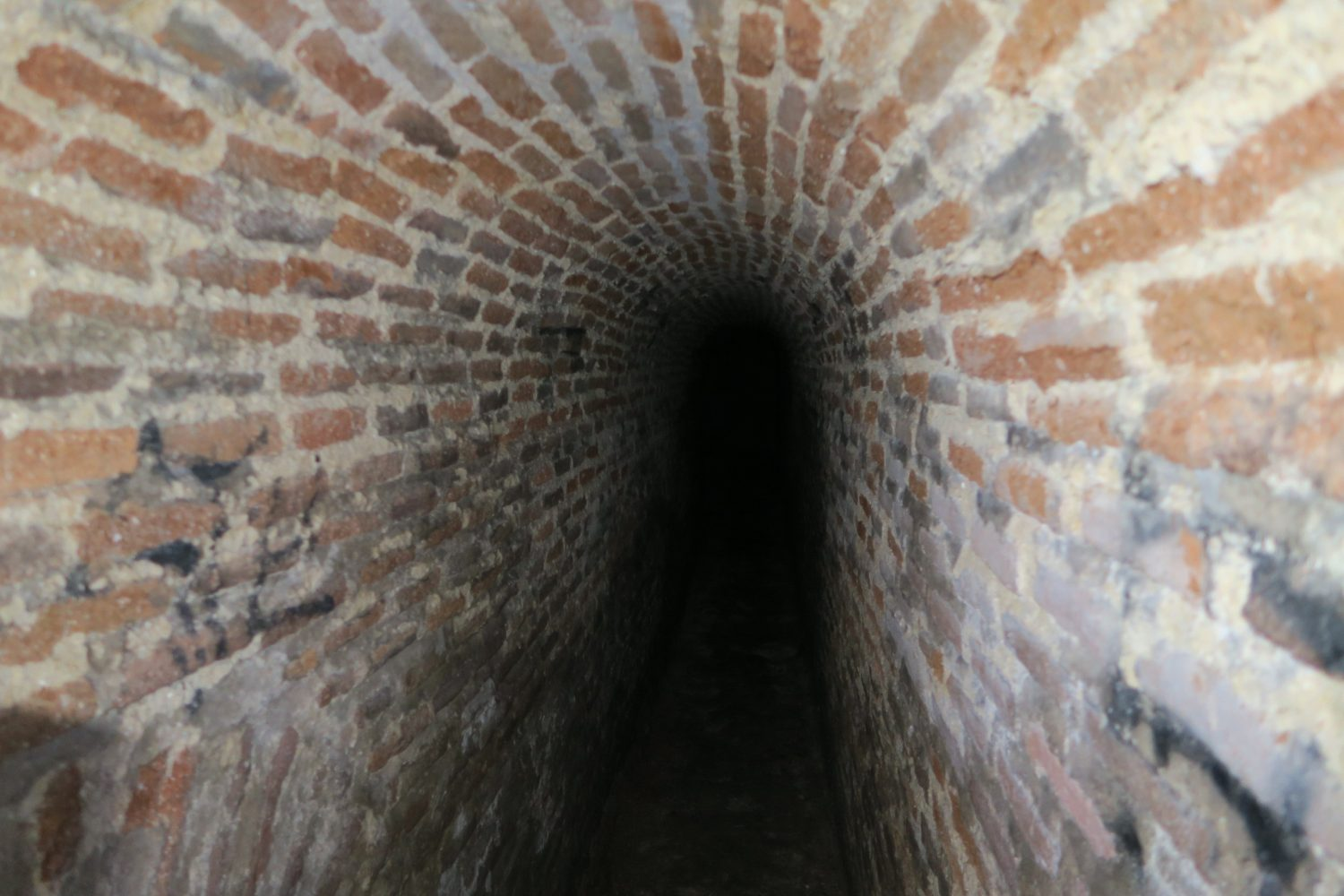
Viaje de Amaniel

In the 17th century, the viajes de agua (a kind of water channel or qanat) were used to provide water to the city. Some of the most important ones were the Viaje de Amaniel (1610–1621, sponsored by the Crown), the Viaje de Fuente Castellana (1613–1620) and Abroñigal Alto/Abroñigal Bajo (1617–1630), sponsored by the City Council. They were the main infrastructure for the supply of water until the arrival of the Canal de Isabel II in the mid-19th century.

Madrid derives almost 73.5 percent of its water supply from dams and reservoirs built on the Lozoya River, such as the El Atazar Dam. This water supply is managed by the Canal de Isabel II, a public entity created in 1851. It is responsible for the supply, depurating waste water and the conservation of all the natural water resources of the Madrid region.

== Demographics ==
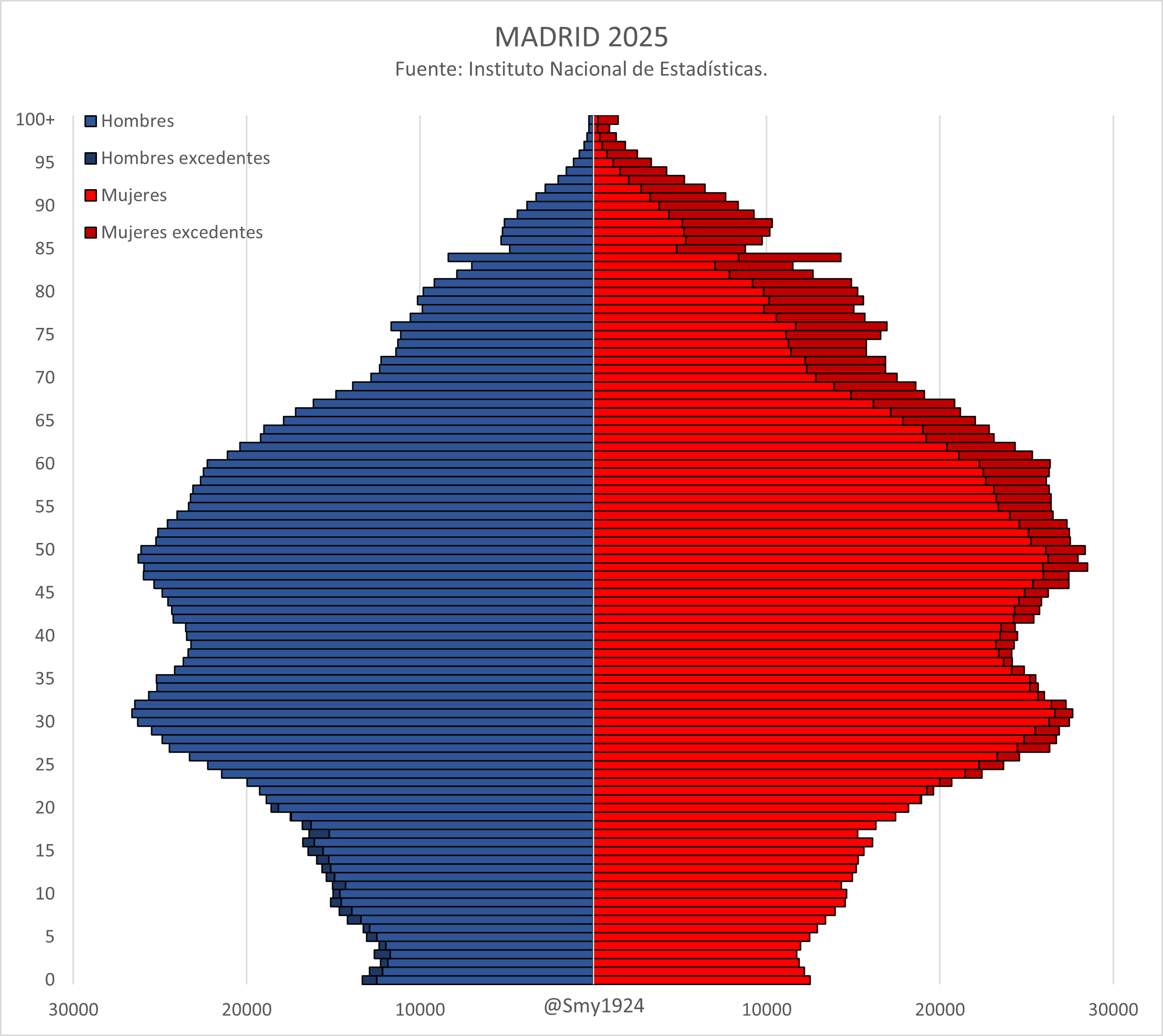
Population pyramid of Madrid as of 2025

Historical population (current borders)
Year	Pop.	±%
1842	169,280	—
1857	298,638	+76.4%
1877	419,243	+40.4%
1887	495,063	+18.1%
1900	575,675	+16.3%
1910	614,322	+6.7%
1920	823,711	+34.1%
1930	1,041,767	+26.5%
1940	1,322,835	+27.0%
1950	1,553,338	+17.4%
1960	2,177,123	+40.2%
1970	3,120,941	+43.4%
1981	3,158,818	+1.2%
1991	2,909,792	−7.9%
2001	2,938,723	+1.0%
2011	3,198,645	+8.8%
2021	3,277,451	+2.5%
Source: INE

As of 2025, the population is 3,477,497, of which 46.9% are males, and 53.1% are females. Minors make up 14.6% of the population, and seniors make up 20.2%.

The population of Madrid has overall increased since the city became the capital of Spain in the mid-16th century, and has stabilised at around 3 million since the 1970s.

From 1970 until the mid-1990s, the population dropped. This phenomenon, which also affected other European cities, was caused in part by the growth of satellite suburbs at the expense of the downtown region within the city proper. This also occurred during a period of slowed growth in the European economy.

The demographic boom accelerated in the late-1990s and early first decade of the 21st century due to immigration in parallel with a surge in Spanish economic growth.

The wider Madrid region is the EU region with the highest average life expectancy at birth. The average life expectancy was 82.2 years for males and 87.8 for females in 2016.

According to Eurostat, the "metropolitan region" of Madrid has a population of slightly more than 6.271 million people covering an area of 4,609.7 km^{2} (1,780 sq mi). It is the largest in Spain and the second largest in the European Union.

=== Immigration ===
As the capital city of Spain, the city has attracted many immigrants from around the world, with most of the immigrants coming from Latin American countries. As of 2025, immigrants make up 29.2% of the population – the majority of them originating from the Americas (around 21.2% of the total population), with a lesser fraction of the population from other European, Asian and African countries. The 5 largest foreign countries of birth are Venezuela, Colombia, Peru, Ecuador, and the Dominican Republic. As of 2025, the fastest-growing groups of immigrants are Colombians, Mexicans, Gambians and Venezuelans, all having increased by over 65% since 2021.

Countries of birth (2025)
Country	Population
Spain	2,460,377
Venezuela	129,269
Colombia	104,854
Peru	102,521
Ecuador	95,047
Dominican Republic	48,518
Honduras	37,907
Argentina	37,466
China	34,981
Morocco	34,627
Paraguay	34,004
Bolivia	30,022
Romania	28,468
Cuba	24,408
Philippines	21,303
Mexico	19,247

As for foreign citizens, as of 2025, they make up 18.8% of the population. The 5 largest foreign countries of citizenship are Venezuela, Colombia, Peru, China, and Italy.

=== Religion ===
Most people in Madrid are Roman Catholic Christians. It is the seat of the Roman Catholic Archdiocese of Madrid. In a 2011 survey conducted by InfoCatólica, 63.3% of Madrid residents of all ages identified themselves as Catholic.

According to a 2019 Centro de Investigaciones Sociológicas (CIS) survey with a sample size of 469 respondents, 20.7% of respondents in Madrid identify themselves as practising Catholics, 45.8% as non-practising Catholics, 3.8% as believers of another religion, 11.1% as agnostics, 3.6% as indifferent towards religion, and 12.8% as atheists. The remaining 2.1% did not state their religious beliefs.

== Government ==
=== Local government and administration ===
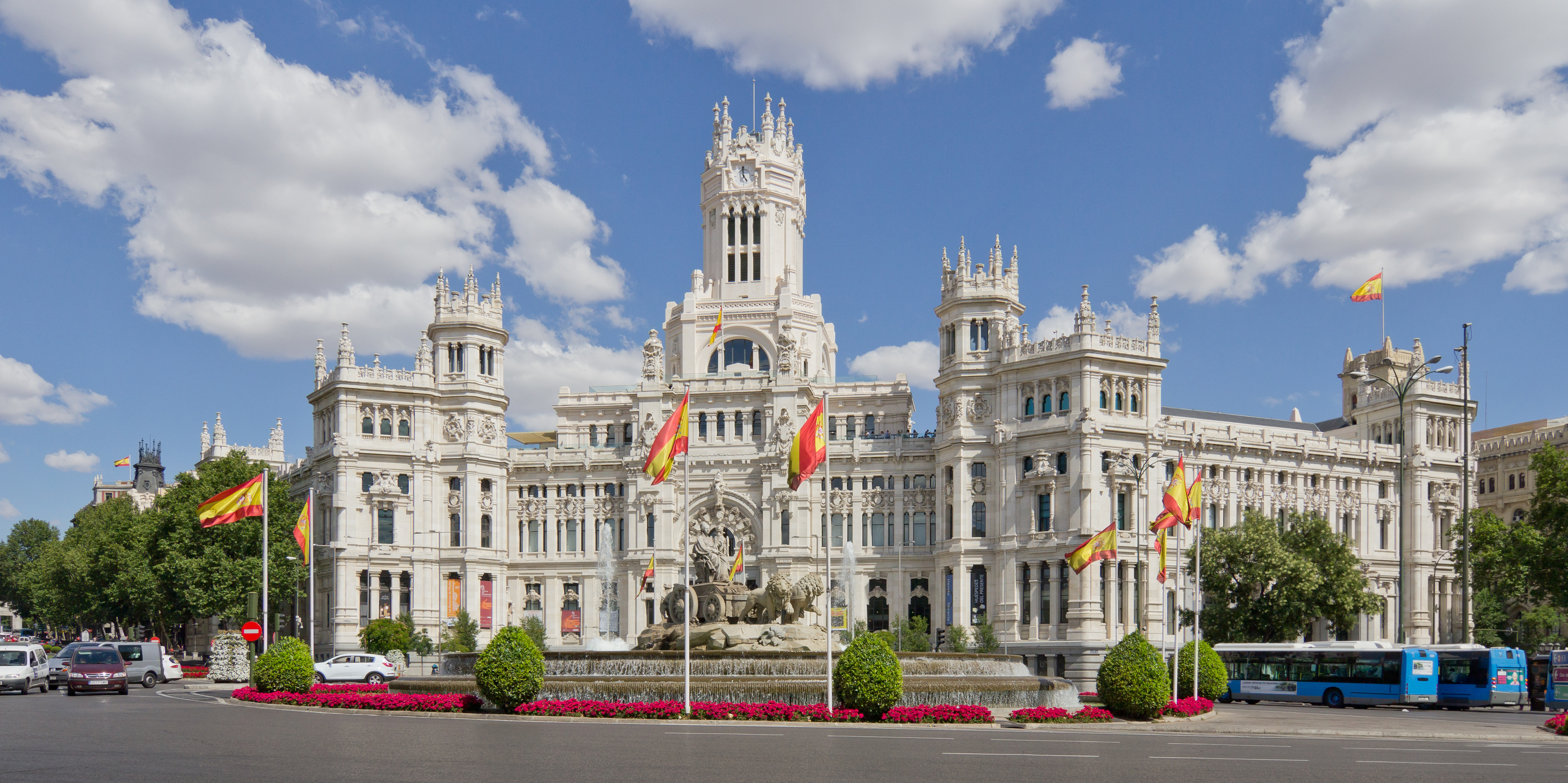
The façade of the city hall

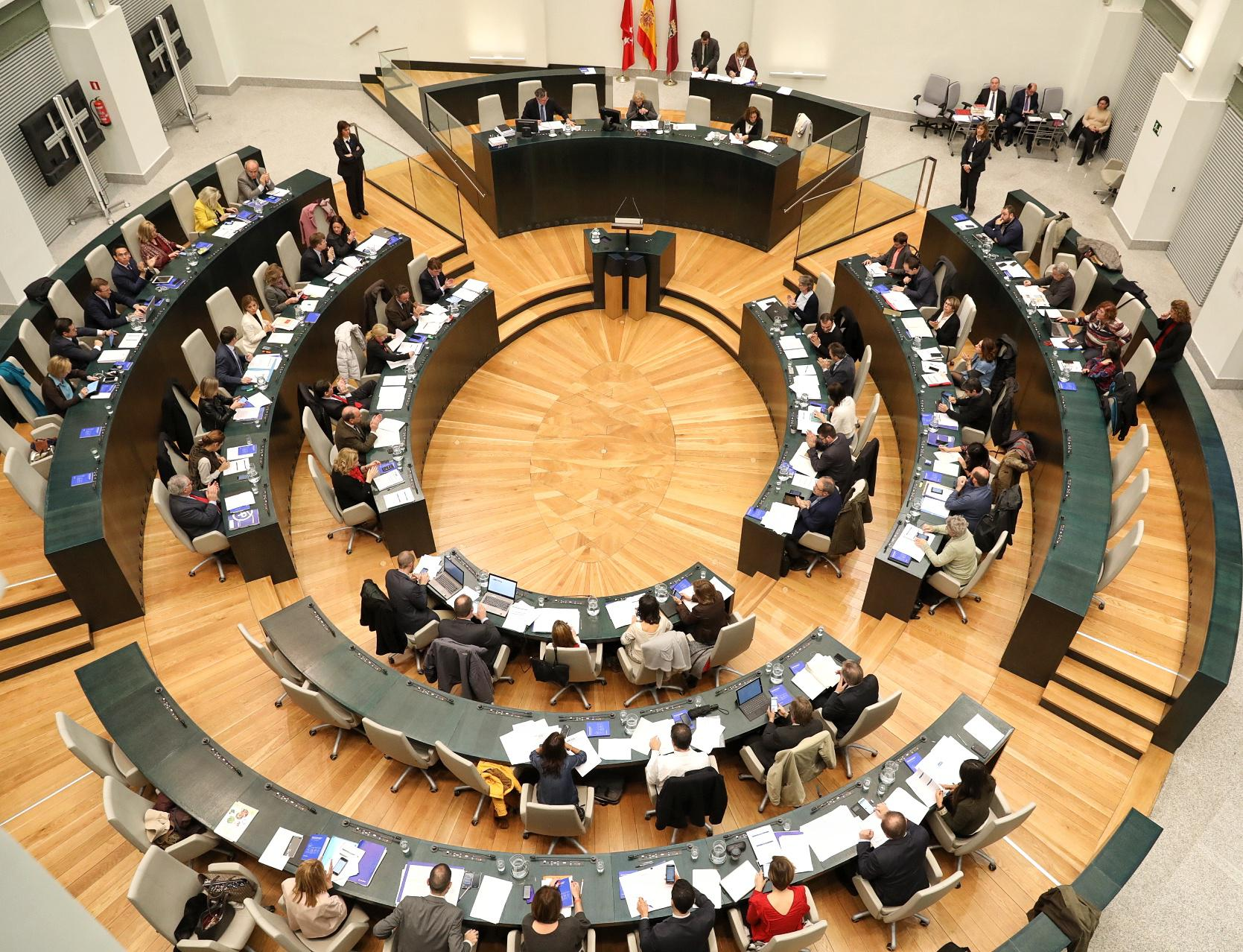
A plenary session of the city council

The City Council (Ayuntamiento de Madrid) is the body responsible for the government and administration of the municipality. It is formed by the Plenary (Pleno), the Mayor (alcalde) and the Government Board (Junta de Gobierno de la Ciudad de Madrid).

The Plenary of the Ayuntamiento is the body of political representation of the citizens in the municipal government. Its 57 members are elected for a 4-year mandate. Some of its attributions are: fiscal matters, the election and deposition of the mayor, the approval and modification of decrees and regulations, the approval of budgets, the agreements related to the limits and alteration of the municipal term, the services management, the participation in supramunicipal organisations, etc.

The mayor, the supreme representative of the city, presides over the Ayuntamiento. He is charged with giving impetus to the municipal policies, managing the action of the rest of bodies and directing the executive municipal administration. He is responsible to the Pleno. He is also entitled to preside over the meetings of the Pleno, although this responsibility can be delegated to another municipal councillor. José Luis Martínez-Almeida, a member of the People's Party, has served as mayor since 2019.

The Government Board consists of the mayor, deputy mayors and a number of delegates assuming the portfolios for the different government areas. All those positions are held by municipal councillors.

Since 2007, the Cybele Palace (or Palace of Communications) serves as City Hall.

=== Capital of Spain ===
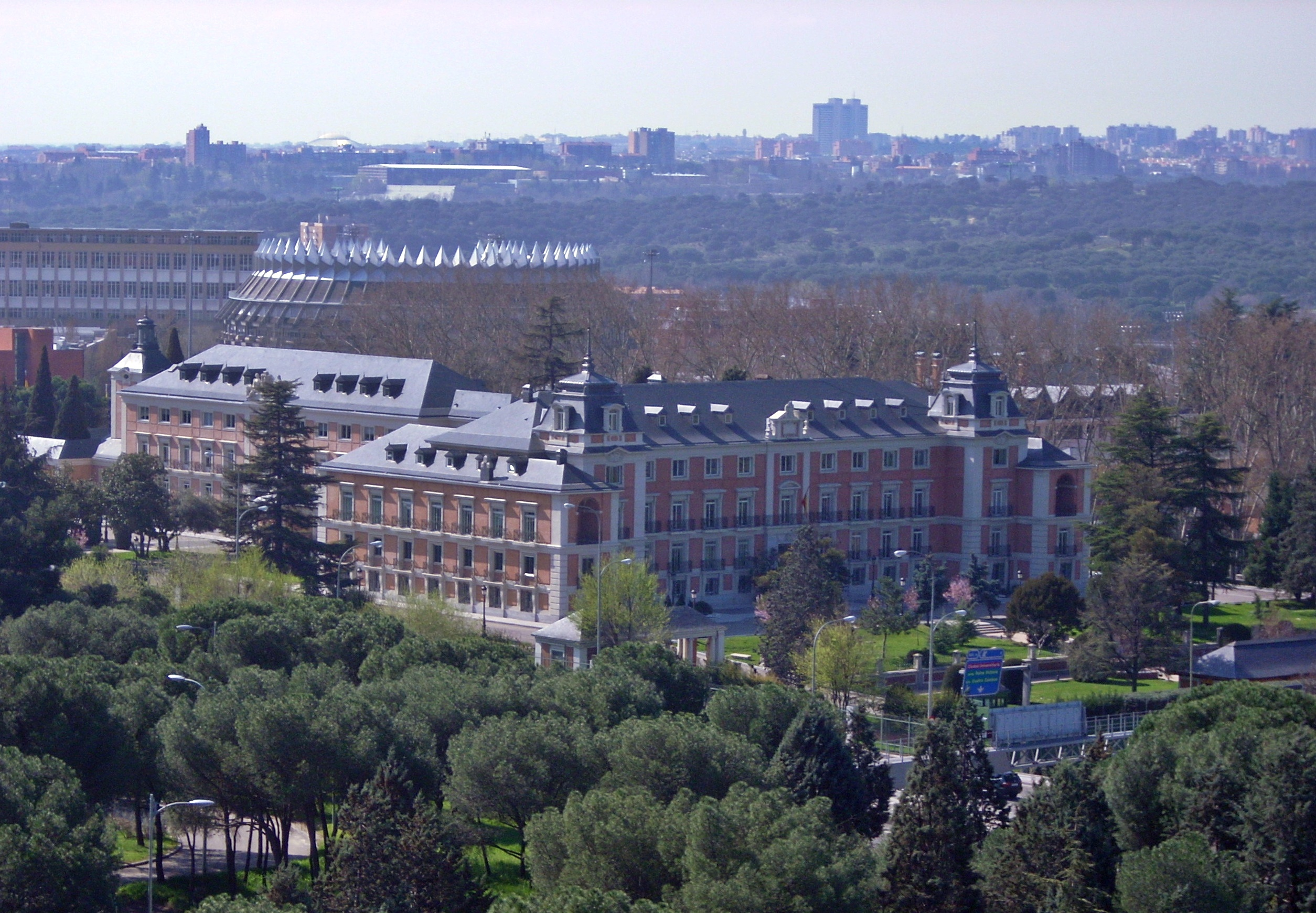
Moncloa Palace, seat of the President of the Government of Spain

Madrid is the capital of Spain. The King of Spain, the country's head of state, has his official residence in the Zarzuela Palace. As the seat of the Government of Spain, Madrid houses the official residence of the President of the Government (Prime Minister) and regular meeting place of the Council of Ministers, the Moncloa Palace, and the headquarters of the ministerial departments.

Both the residences of the head of state and government are located in the northwest of Madrid. The seats of the Lower and Upper Chambers of the Spanish Parliament, the Cortes Generales (respectively, the Palacio de las Cortes and the Palacio del Senado), are in Madrid.

=== Regional capital ===
Madrid is the capital of the Community of Madrid. The region has its own legislature and enjoys a wide range of competencies in areas such as social spending, healthcare, and education. The seat of the regional parliament, the Assembly of Madrid, is located at the district of Puente de Vallecas. The presidency of the regional government is headquartered at the Royal House of the Post Office at the very centre of the city, the Puerta del Sol.

=== Law enforcement ===
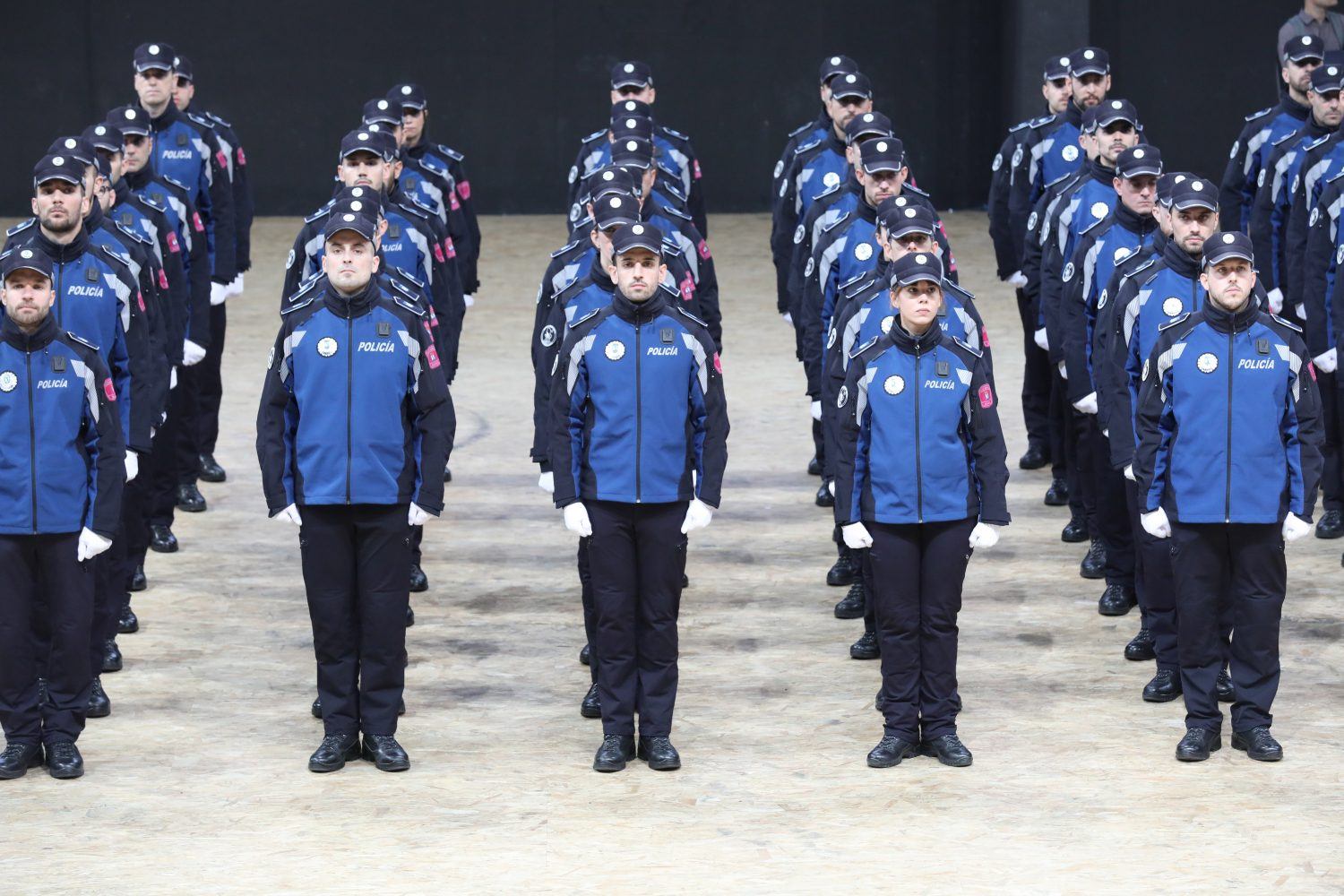
Municipal police agents from the 2018 promotion

The Madrid Municipal Police (Policía Municipal de Madrid) is the local law enforcement body, dependent on the Ayuntamiento. In 2018, it had a workforce of 6,190 civil servants.

The headquarters of both the Directorate-General of the Police and the Directorate-General of the Civil Guard are located in Madrid. The headquarters of the Higher Office of Police of Madrid (Jefatura Superior de Policía de Madrid), the peripheral branch of the National Police Corps with jurisdiction over the region also lies in Madrid.

=== Administrative subdivisions ===
Madrid is administratively divided into 21 districts, which are further subdivided into 131 neighbourhoods (barrios):

District	Population (1 January 2023)	Area (ha)
Centro	138,204	522.82
Arganzuela	153,304	646.22
Retiro	117,918	546.62
Salamanca	145,702	539.24
Chamartín	144,796	917.55
Tetuán	160,002	537.47
Chamberí	138,204	467.92
Fuencarral-El Pardo	248,443	23,783.84
Moncloa-Aravaca	121,757	4,653.11
Latina	241,672	2,542.72
Carabanchel	262,339	1,404.83
Usera	142,746	777.77
Puente de Vallecas	241,603	1,496.86
Moratalaz	92,814	610.32
Ciudad Lineal	220,345	1,142.57
Hortaleza	198,391	2,741.98
Villaverde	159,038	2,018.76
Villa de Vallecas	117,501	5,146.72
Vicálvaro	83,804	3,526.67
San Blas-Canillejas	161,219	2,229.24
Barajas	48,646	4,192.28
Total	3,339,931	60,445.51

== Economy ==
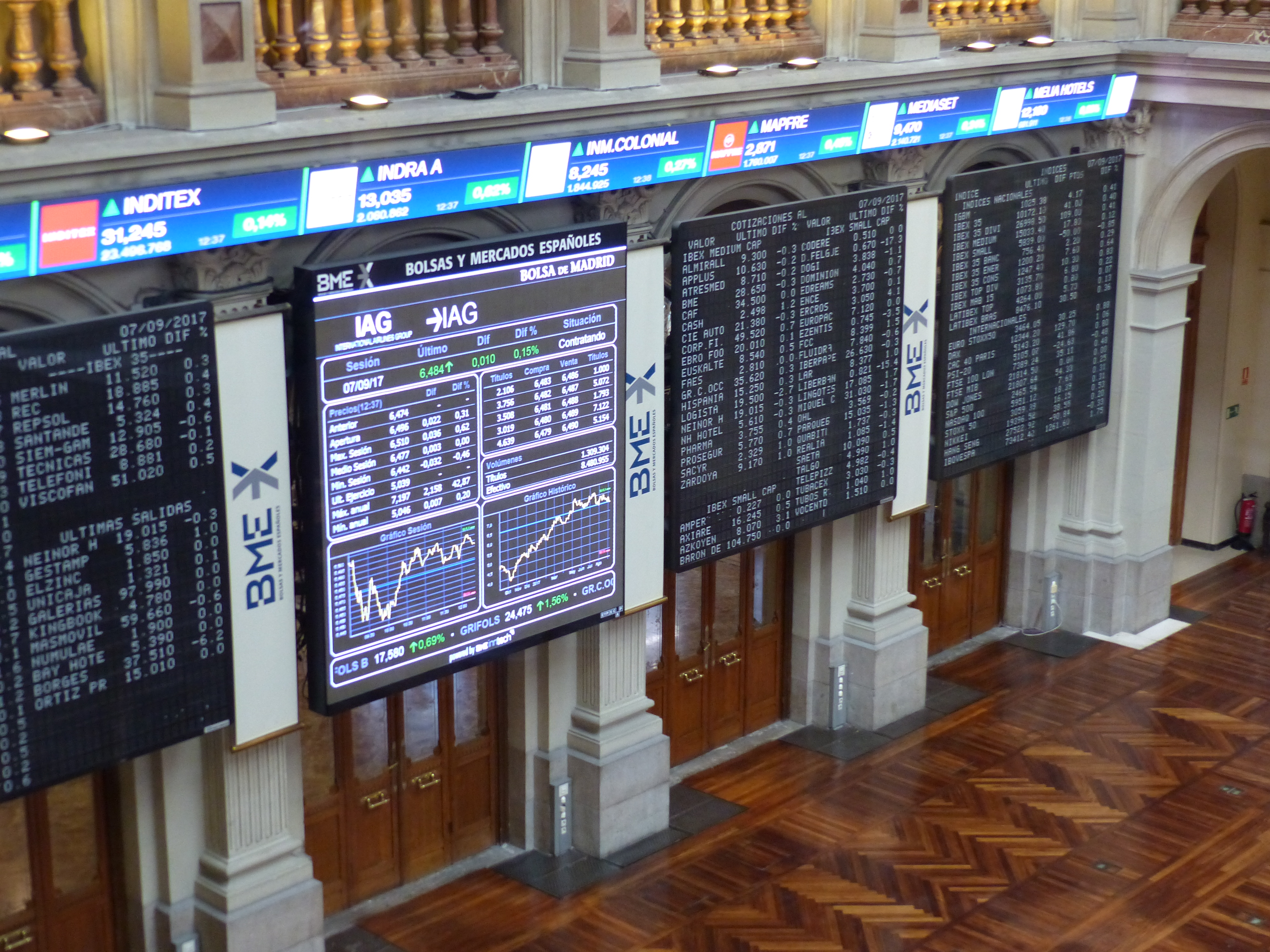
The Madrid Stock Exchange

After it became the capital of Spain in the 16th century, Madrid was more a centre of consumption than of production or trade. Economic activity was largely devoted to supplying the city's own rapidly growing population, including the royal household and national government, and to such trades as banking and publishing.

A large industrial sector did not develop until the 20th century, but thereafter industry greatly expanded and diversified, making Madrid the second industrial city in Spain. However, the economy of the city is now becoming more and more dominated by the service sector. A major European financial centre, its stock market is the third largest stock market in Europe featuring both the IBEX 35 index and the attached Latibex stock market (with the second most important index for Latin American companies).

Madrid is the 5th most important leading Centre of Commerce in Europe (after London, Paris, Frankfurt and Amsterdam) and ranks 11th in the world. It is the leading Spanish-speaking city in terms of webpage creation.

=== Economic history ===
As the capital city of the Spanish Empire from 1561, Madrid's population grew rapidly. Administration, banking, and small-scale manufacturing centred on the royal court were among the main activities, but the city was more a locus of consumption than production or trade, geographically isolated as it was before the coming of the railways.

The Bank of Spain is one of the oldest European central banks. Originally named as the Bank of San Carlos as it was founded in 1782, it was later renamed to Bank of San Fernando in 1829 and ultimately became the Bank of Spain in 1856. Its headquarters are located at the calle de Alcalá. The Madrid Stock Exchange was inaugurated on 20 October 1831. Its benchmark stock market index is the IBEX 35.

Industry started to develop on a large scale only in the 20th century, but then grew rapidly, especially during the "Spanish miracle" period around the 1960s. The economy of the city was then centred on manufacturing industries such as those related to motor vehicles, aircraft, chemicals, electronic devices, pharmaceuticals, processed food, printed materials, and leather goods. Since the restoration of democracy in the late 1970s, the city has continued to expand. Its economy is now among the most dynamic and diverse in the European Union.

=== Present-day economy ===
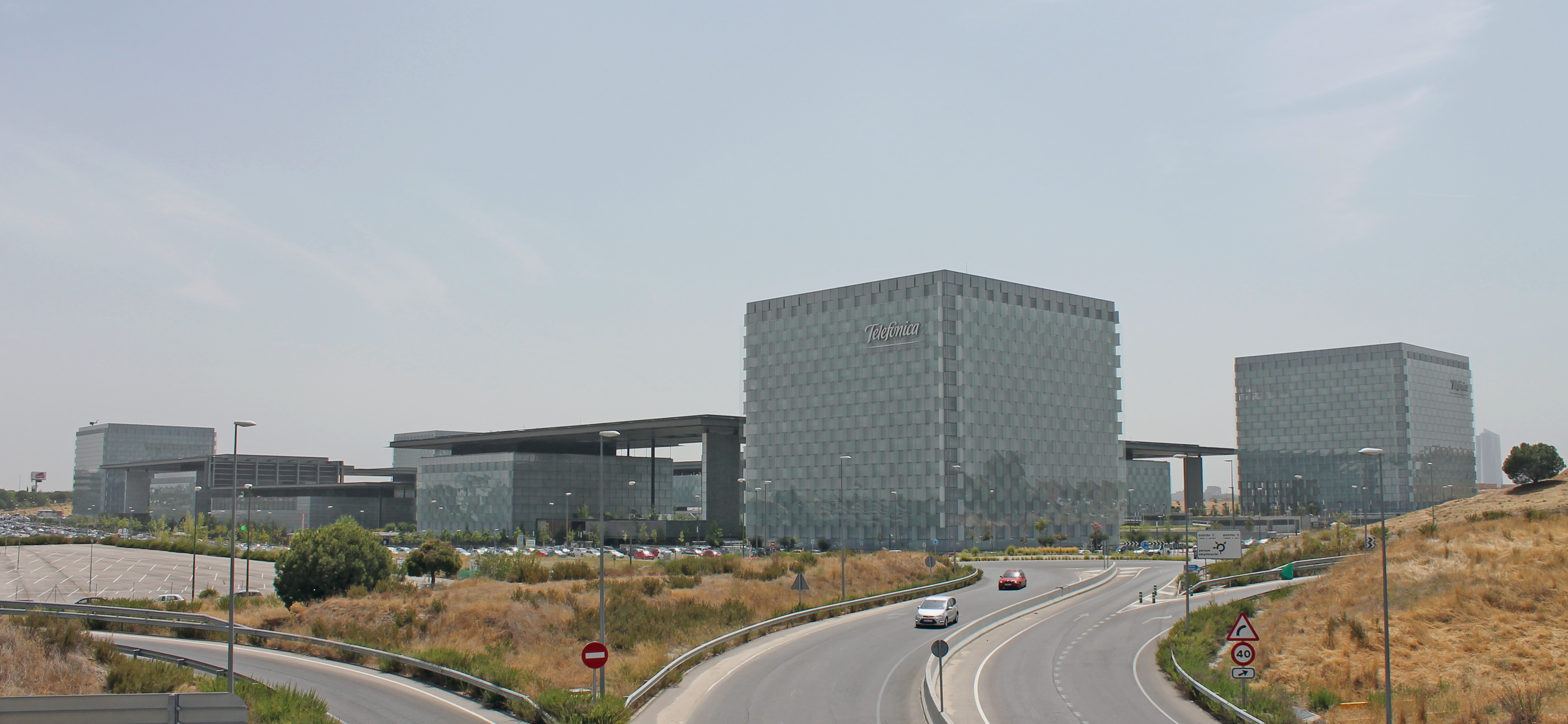
Telefónica headquarters

Madrid concentrates activities directly connected with power (central and regional government, headquarters of Spanish companies, regional HQ of multinationals, financial institutions) and with knowledge and technological innovation (research centres and universities). It is one of Europe's largest financial centres, and the largest in Spain. The city has 17 universities and over 30 research centres. It is the second metropolis in the EU by population, and the third by gross internal product. Leading employers include Telefónica, Iberia, Prosegur, BBVA, Urbaser, Dragados, and FCC.

The Community of Madrid, the region comprising the city and the rest of municipalities of the province, had a GDP of €220B in 2017, equating to a GDP per capita of €33,800. In 2011 the city itself had a GDP per capita 74% above the national average and 70% above that of the 27 European Union member states, although 11% behind the average of the top 10 cities of the EU. Although housing just over 50% of the region's population, the city generates 65.9% of its GDP. Following the recession commencing 2007/8, recovery was under way by 2014, with forecast growth rates for the city of 1.4% in 2014, 2.7% in 2015 and 2.8% in 2016.

The economy of Madrid has become based increasingly on the service sector. In 2011 services accounted for 85.9% of value added, while industry contributed 7.9% and construction 6.1%. Nevertheless, Madrid continues to hold the position of Spain's second industrial centre after Barcelona, specialising particularly in high-technology production. Following the recession, services and industry were forecast to return to growth in 2014, and construction in 2015.

==== Standard of living ====
Mean household income and spending are 12% above the Spanish average. The proportion classified as "at risk of poverty" in 2010 was 15.6%, up from 13.0% in 2006 but less than the average for Spain of 21.8%. The proportion classified as affluent was 43.3%, much higher than Spain overall (28.6%).

Consumption by Madrid residents has been affected by job losses and by austerity measures, including a rise in sales tax from 8% to 21% in 2012.

Although residential property prices have fallen by 39% since 2007, the average price of dwelling space was €2,375.6 per sq. m. in early 2014, and is shown as second only to London in a list of 22 European cities.

==== Employment ====
Participation in the labour force was 1,638,200 in 2011, or 79.0%. The employed workforce comprised 49% women in 2011 (Spain, 45%). 41% of economically active people are university graduates, against 24% for Spain as a whole.

In 2011, the unemployment rate was 15.8%, remaining lower than in Spain as a whole. Among those aged 16–24, the unemployment rate was 39.6%. Unemployment reached a peak of 19.1% in 2013, but with the start of an economic recovery in 2014, employment started to increase. Employment continues to shift further towards the service sector, with 86% of all jobs in this sector by 2011, against 74% in all of Spain. In the second quarter of 2018 the unemployment rate was 10.06%.

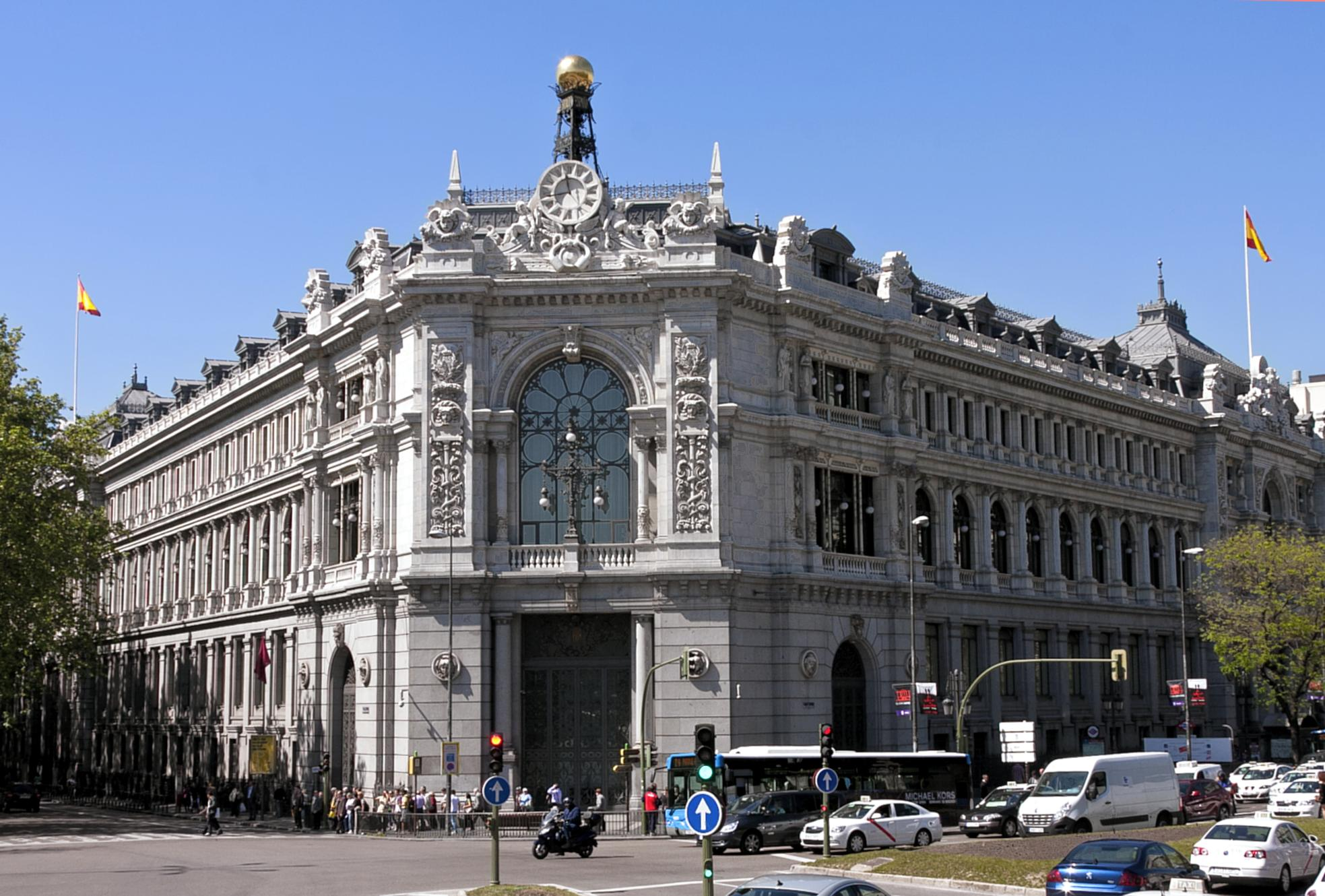
Headquarters of the Bank of Spain

==== Services ====
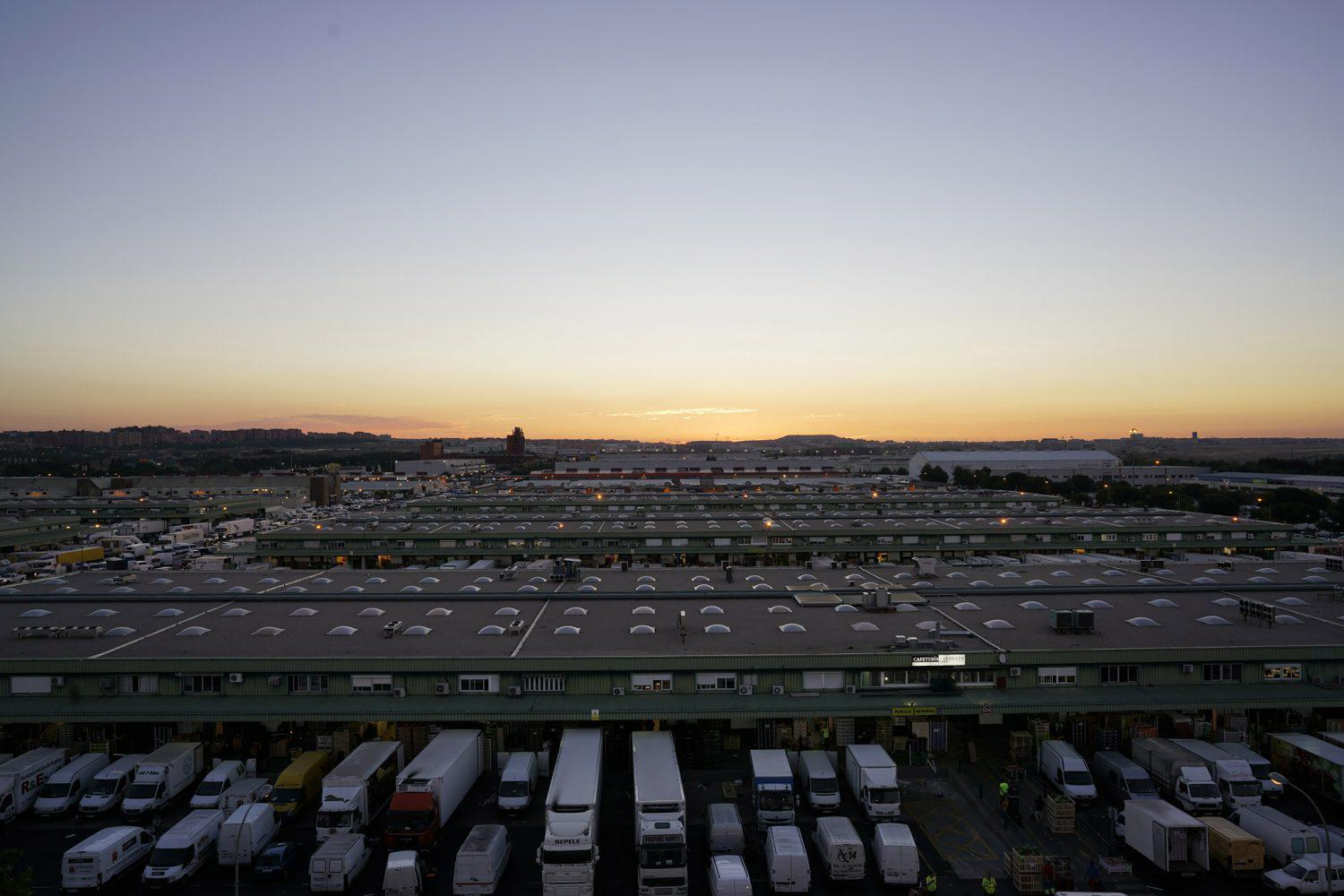
Mercamadrid facilities in South-Eastern Madrid

The share of services in the city's economy is 86%. Services for business, transport & communications, property, and finance together account for 52% of the total value added. The types of services that are now expanding are mainly those that facilitate movement of capital, information, goods and persons, and "advanced business services" such as research and development (R&D), information technology, and technical accountancy.

Madrid and the wider region's authorities have put a notable effort in the development of logistics infrastructure. Within the city proper, some of the standout centres include Mercamadrid, the Madrid-Abroñigal logistics centre, the Villaverde's Logistics Centre and the Vicálvaro's Logistics Centre to name a few.

Banks based in Madrid carry out 72% of the banking activity in Spain. The Spanish central bank, Bank of Spain, has existed in Madrid since 1782. Stocks & shares, bond markets, insurance, and pension funds are other important forms of financial institution in the city.

Madrid is an important centre for trade fairs, many of them coordinated by IFEMA, the Trade Fair Institution of Madrid. The public sector employs 18.1% of all employees. Madrid attracts about 8M tourists annually from other parts of Spain and from all over the world, exceeding even Barcelona. Spending by tourists in Madrid was estimated (2011) at €9,546.5M, or 7.7% of the city's GDP.

The construction of transport infrastructure has been vital to maintain the economic position of Madrid. Travel to work and other local journeys use a high-capacity metropolitan road network and a well-used public transport system. In terms of longer-distance transport, Madrid is the central node of the system of autovías and of the high-speed rail network (AVE), which has brought major cities such as Seville and Barcelona within 2.5 hours travel time. Also important to the city's economy is Madrid-Barajas Airport, the fourth largest airport in Europe. Madrid's central location makes it a major logistical base.

==== Industry ====
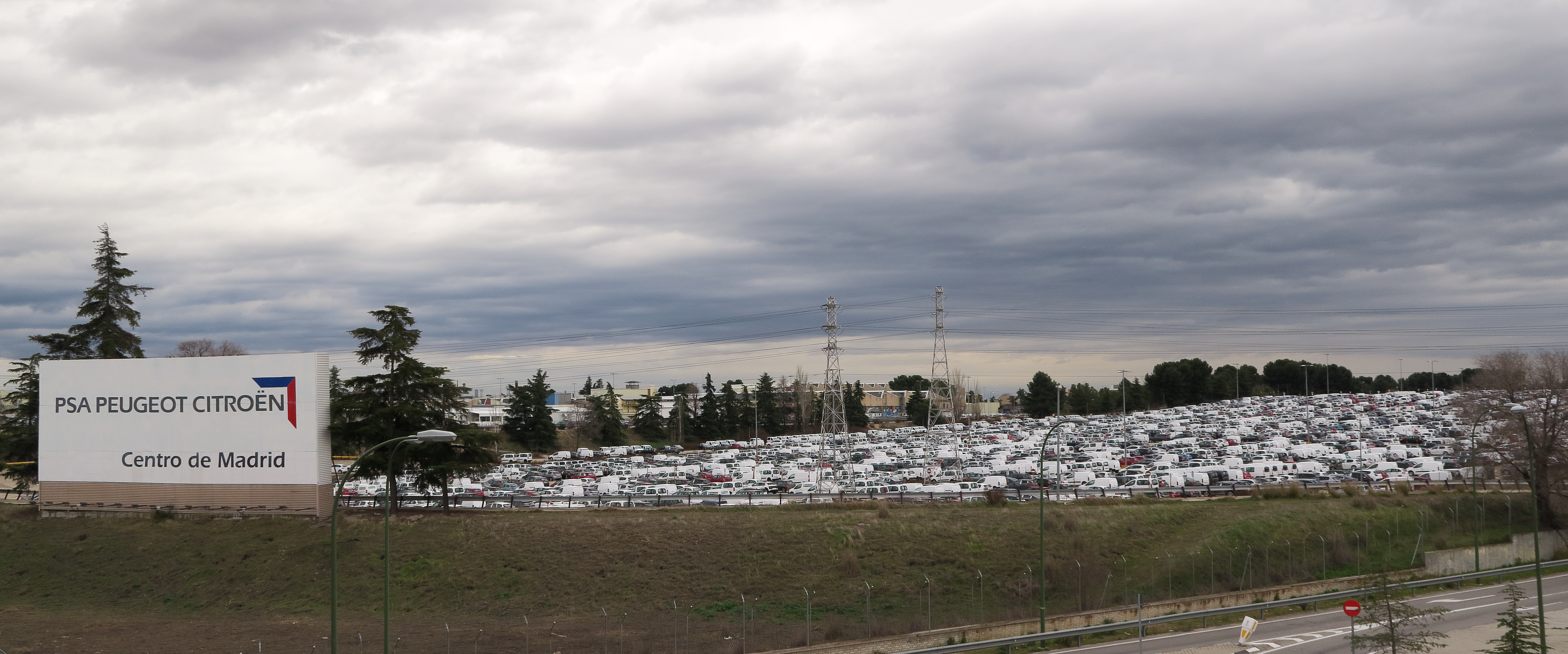
PSA Peugeot Citroën plant in Villaverde district

As an industrial centre Madrid retains its advantages in infrastructure, as a transport hub, and as the location of headquarters of many companies. Industries based on advanced technology are acquiring much more importance here than in the rest of Spain. Industry contributed 7.5% to Madrid's value-added in 2010. However, industry has slowly declined within the city boundaries as more industry has moved outward to the periphery. Industrial Gross Value Added grew by 4.3% in the period 2003–2005, but decreased by 10% during 2008–2010. The leading industries were: paper, printing & publishing, 28.8%; energy & mining, 19.7%; vehicles & transport equipment, 12.9%; electrical and electronic, 10.3%; foodstuffs, 9.6%; clothing, footwear & textiles, 8.3%; chemical, 7.9%; industrial machinery, 7.3%.

The PSA Peugeot Citroën plant is located in Villaverde district.

==== Construction ====
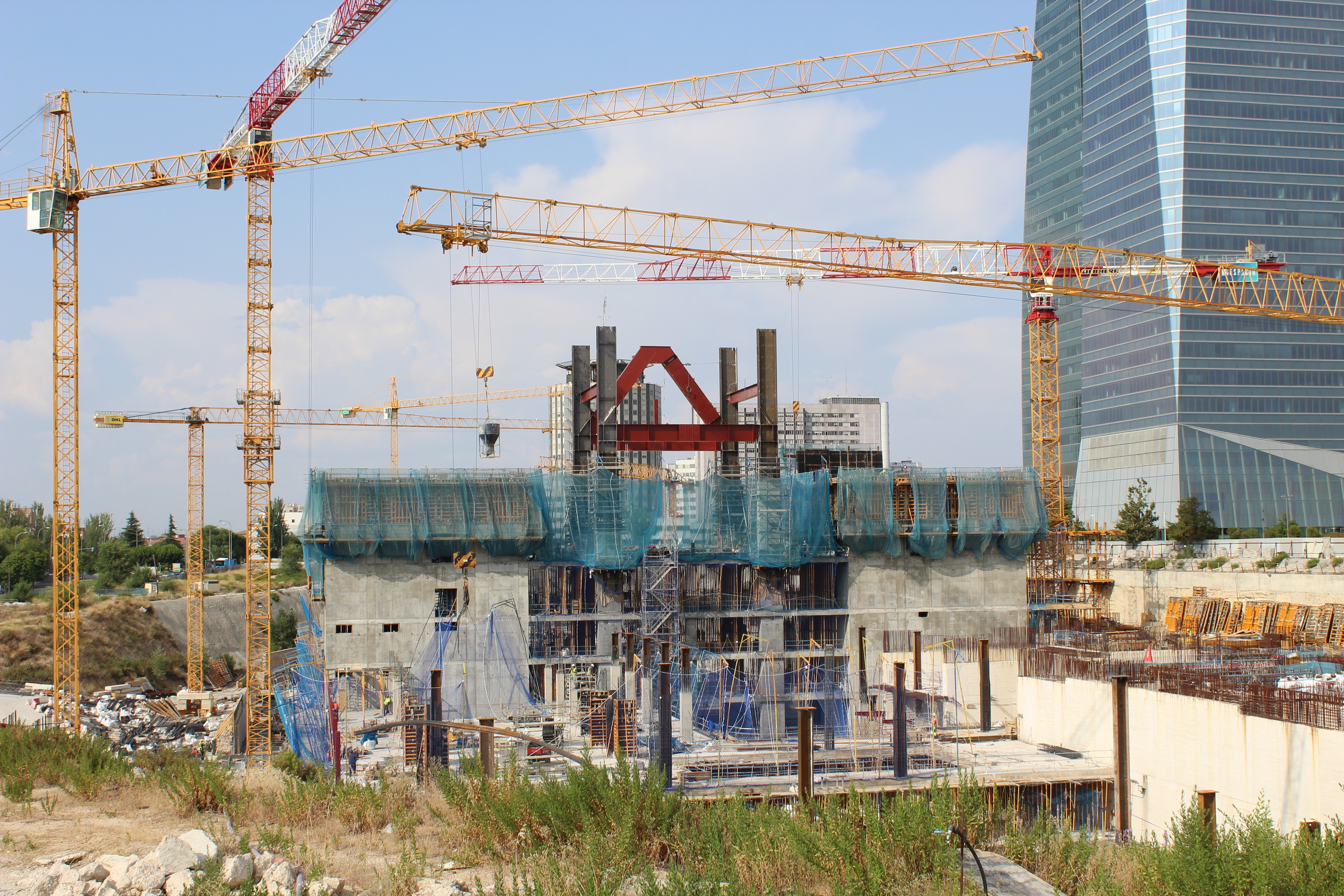
Building works of Caleido in August 2018

The construction sector, contributing 6.5% to the city's economy in 2010, was a growing sector before the recession, aided by a large transport and infrastructure program. More recently the construction sector has fallen away and earned 8% less in 2009 than it had been in 2000. The decrease was particularly marked in the residential sector, where prices dropped by 25%–27% from 2007 to 2012/13 and the number of sales fell by 57%.

==== Tourism ====
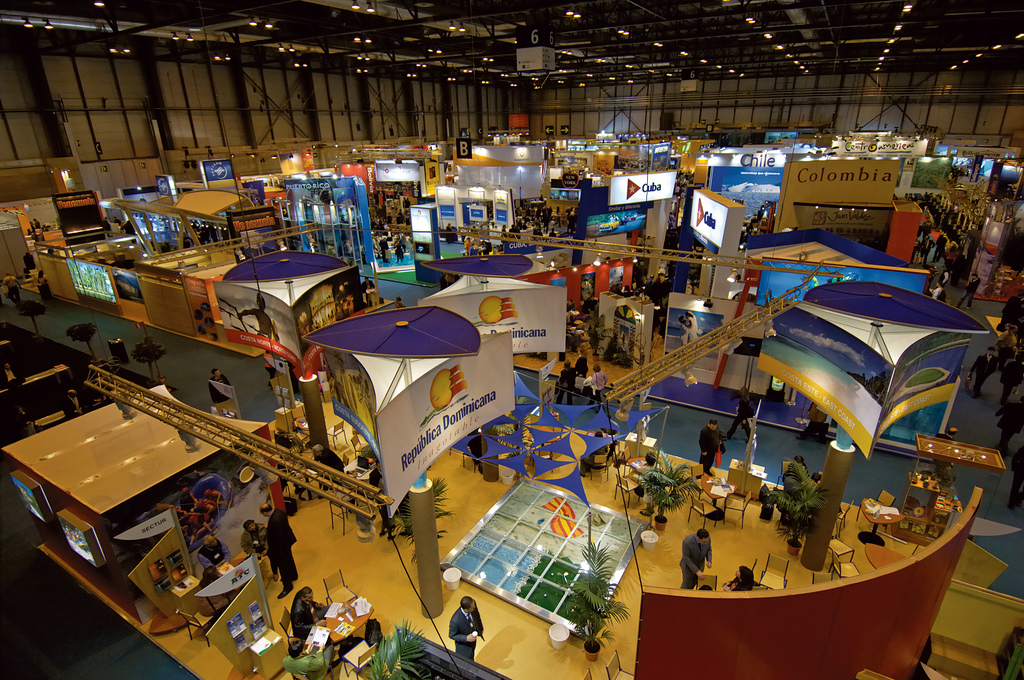
Fitur fair in Ifema

Madrid is the seat of the World Tourism Organization (UNWTO) and the International Tourism Fair (FITUR).

In 2018, the city received 10.21 million tourists (53.3% of them international tourists).^{p. 9} The biggest share of international tourists come from the United States, followed by Italy, France, United Kingdom and Germany.^{p. 10} As of 2018, the city has 793 hotels, 85,418 hotel places and 43,816 hotel rooms.^{p. 18} It also had, as of 2018, an estimated 20,217 tourist apartments.^{p. 20}

The most visited museum was the Museo Nacional Centro de Arte Reina Sofía, with 3.8 million visitors in the sum of its three seats in 2018. Conversely, the Prado Museum had 2.8 million visitors and the Thyssen-Bornemisza Museum 906,815 visitors.^{p. 32}

By the late 2010s, the gentrification and the spike of tourist apartments in the city centre led to an increase in rental prices, pushing residents out of the city centre. Most of the tourist apartments in Madrid (50–54%) are located in the Centro District. In the Sol neighbourhood (part of the latter district), 3 out of 10 homes are dedicated to tourist apartments, and two out of 10 are listed on Airbnb. In April 2019 the plenary of the ayuntamiento passed a plan intending to regulate this practice, seeking to greatly limit the number of tourist apartments. The normative would enforce a requirement for independent access to those apartments on and off the street. However, after the change of government in June 2019, the new municipal administration planned to revert the regulation.

==== International rankings ====
A recent study placed Madrid 7th among 36 cities as an attractive base for business. It was placed third in terms of availability of office space, and fifth for ease of access to markets, availability of qualified staff, mobility within the city, and quality of life. Its less favourable characteristics were seen as pollution, languages spoken, and political environment. Another ranking of European cities placed Madrid 5th among 25 cities (behind Berlin, London, Paris and Frankfurt), being rated favourably on economic factors and the labour market as well as transport and communication.

=== Media and entertainment ===
The Madrid metropolitan area is an important film and television production hub, whose content is distributed throughout the Spanish-speaking world and abroad. It is often seen as the entry point into the European media market for Latin American media companies, and likewise the entry point into the Latin American markets for European companies. It is also the headquarters of media groups such as Radiotelevisión Española (RTVE), Atresmedia, Mediaset España, and Movistar+, which produce numerous films, television shows and series which are distributed globally on various platforms. Since 2018, it is also home to Netflix's Madrid Production Hub, Mediapro Studio, and numerous others such as Viacom International Studios. As of 2019, the film and television industry employs 19,000 people locally (44% of people in Spain working in this industry).

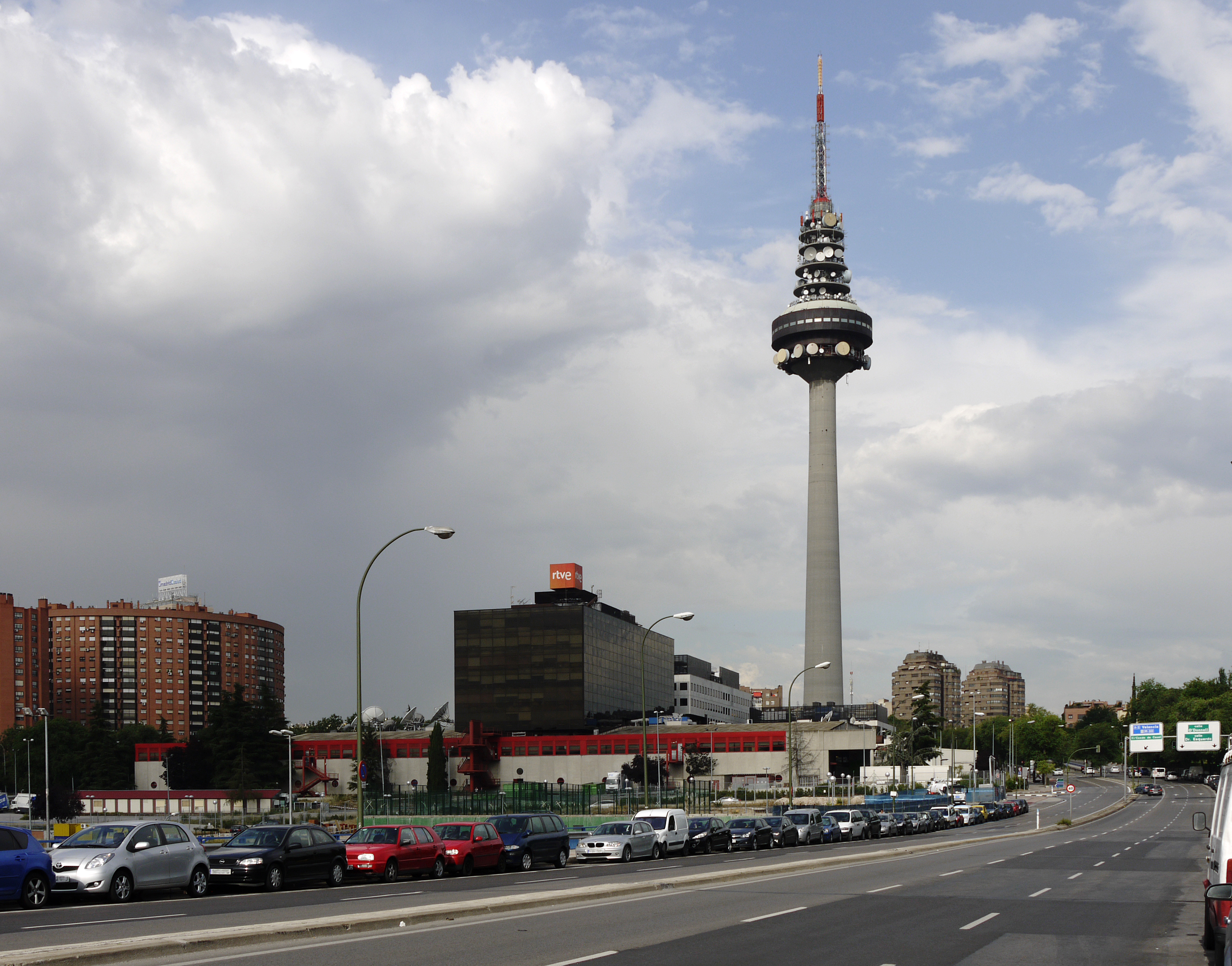
TVE's central news services are located at the foot of Torrespaña.

The Torrespaña broadcasting tower, located in Madrid's Salamanca district, is the central and main transmission node of the terrestrial broadcasting network in Spain. RTVE, the state-owned radio and television public broadcaster is headquartered in Pozuelo de Alarcón along with all its channels and web services (La 1, La 2, Clan, Teledeporte, 24 Horas, TVE Internacional, Radio Nacional, Radio Exterior, and Radio Clásica). Atresmedia group (Antena 3, La Sexta, Onda Cero) is headquartered in San Sebastián de los Reyes. Mediaset España (Telecinco, Cuatro) maintains its headquarters in Madrid's Fuencarral-El Pardo district. Together with RTVE, Atresmedia and Mediaset account for nearly the 80% of share of generalist television. The Spanish media conglomerate PRISA (Cadena SER, Los 40 Principales, M80 Radio, Cadena Dial) is headquartered in Gran Vía street in central Madrid.

Besides hosting the main television and radio producers and broadcasters, the metropolitan area hosts most of the major written mass media in Spain, including ABC, El País, El Mundo, La Razón, Marca, ¡Hola!, Diario AS, El Confidencial and Cinco Días. The Spanish international news agency EFE maintains its headquarters in Madrid since its inception in 1939. The second news agency of Spain is the privately owned Europa Press, founded and headquartered in Madrid since 1953.

== Culture ==
=== Architecture ===
Little medieval architecture is preserved in Madrid, mostly in the Almendra Central, including the San Nicolás and San Pedro el Viejo church towers, the church of San Jerónimo el Real, and the Bishop's Chapel. Nor has Madrid retained much Renaissance architecture, other than the Bridge of Segovia and the Convent of Las Descalzas Reales.

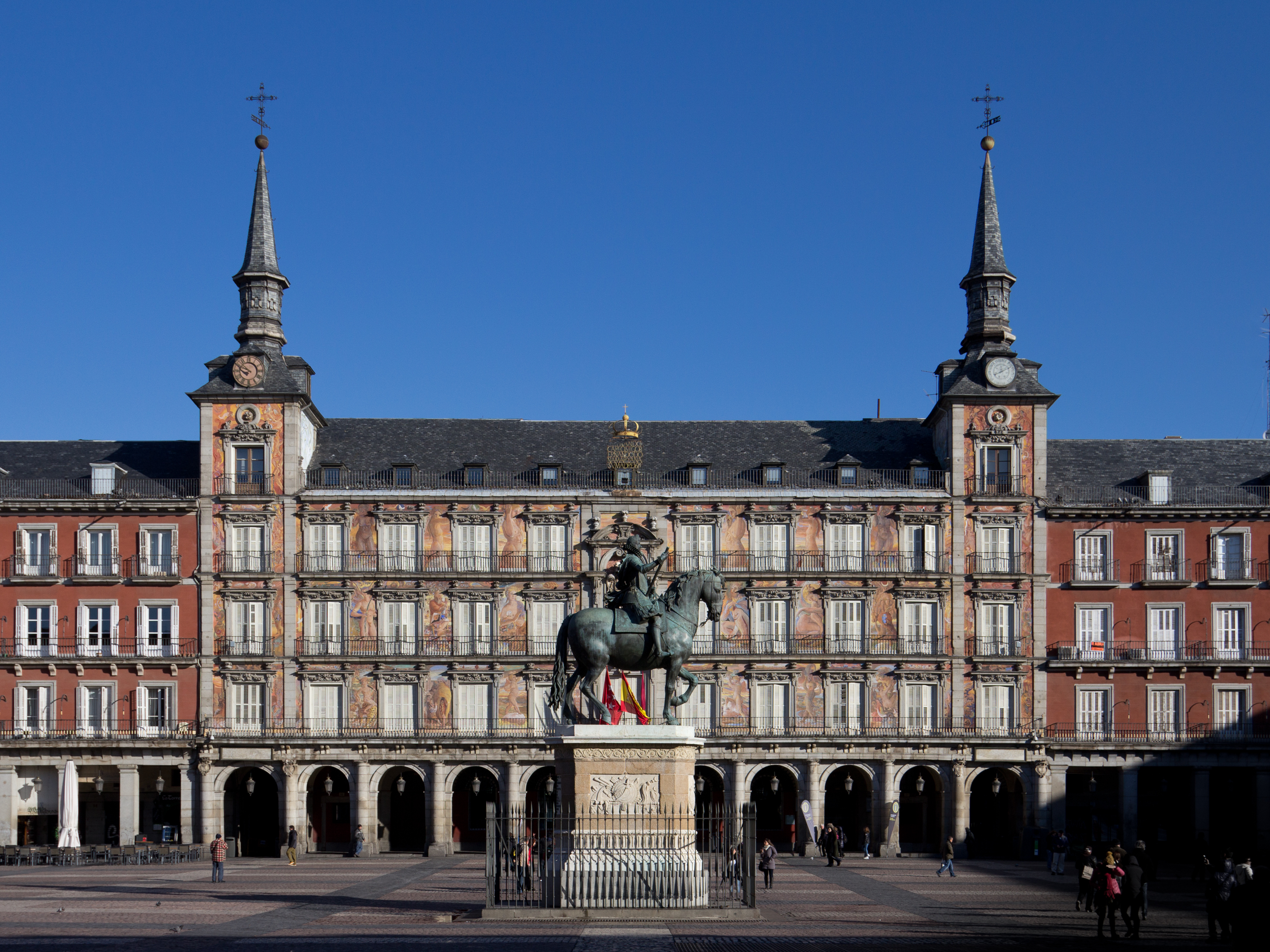
The Plaza Mayor, built in the 16th century

Philip II moved his court to Madrid in 1561 and transformed the town into a capital city. During the Early Habsburg period, the import of European influences took place, underpinned by the monicker of Austrian style. The Austrian style features Austrian, Italian, Dutch and Spanish influences, reflecting on the international preeminence of the Habsburgs. During the second half of the 16th century, the use of pointy slate spires in order to top structures such as church towers was imported to Spain from Central Europe. Slate spires and roofs consequently became a staple of the Madrilenian architecture at the time.

Stand out architecture in the city dating back to the early 17th century includes several buildings and structures, most of them attributed to Juan Gómez de Mora such as the Palace of the Duke of Uceda (1610), the Monastery of La Encarnación (1611–1616); the Plaza Mayor (1617–1619) or the Cárcel de Corte (1629–1641), known as the Santa Cruz Palace. The 1600s saw the construction of the former City Hall, the Casa de la Villa.

The Imperial College church model dome was imitated in all of Spain. Pedro de Ribera introduced Churrigueresque architecture to Madrid. The Cuartel del Conde-Duque, the church of Montserrat, and the Bridge of Toledo are among the best examples.

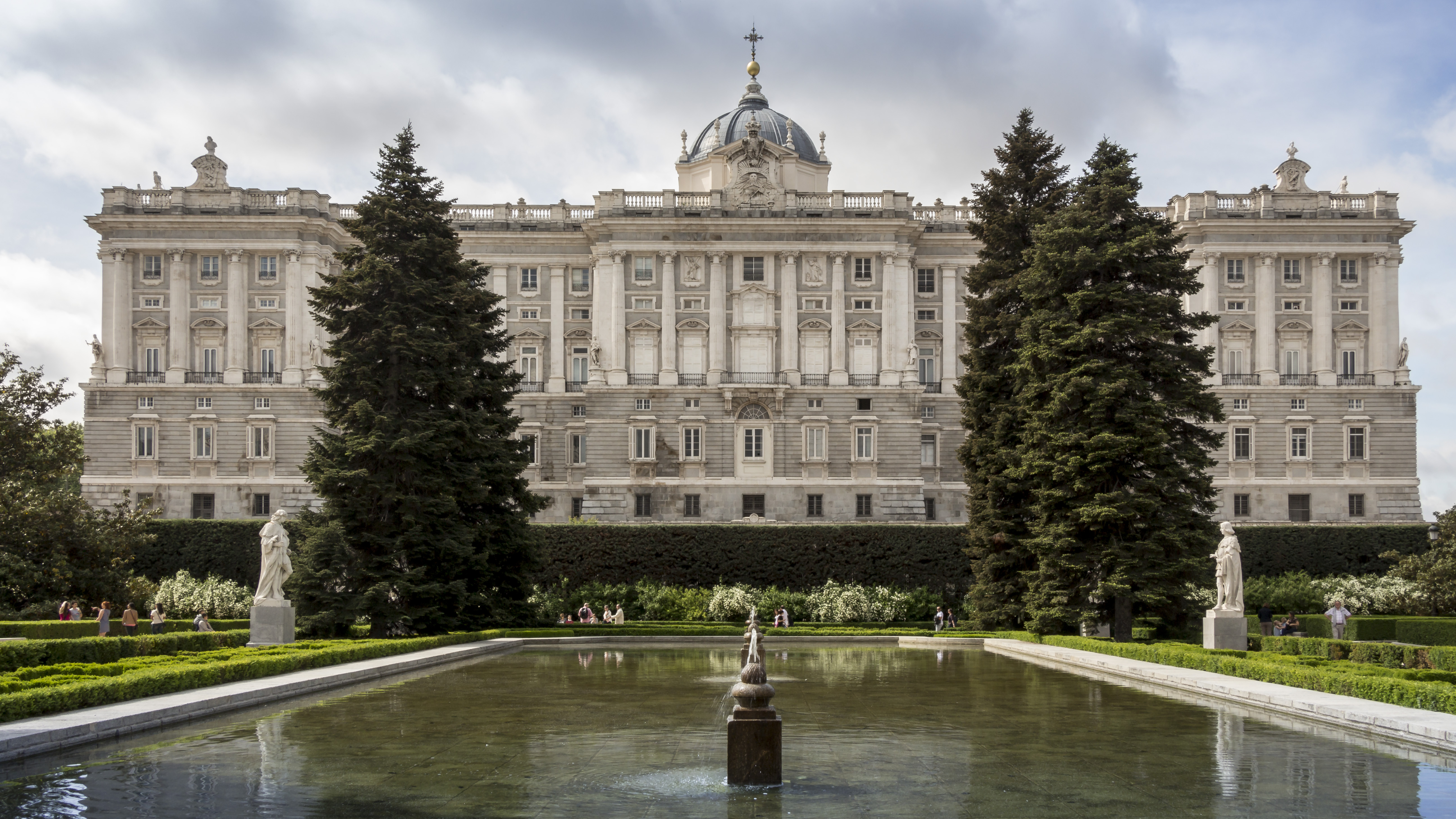
The Royal Palace of Madrid, built in the 18th century

The reign of the Bourbons during the eighteenth century marked a new era in Madrid. Philip V tried to complete King Philip II's vision of urbanisation of Madrid. Philip V built a palace in line with French taste, and buildings such as St. Michael's Basilica and the Church of Santa Bárbara. King Charles III beautified the city and endeavoured to convert Madrid into one of the great European capitals. He pushed forward the construction of the Prado Museum (originally intended as a Natural Science Museum), the Puerta de Alcalá, the Royal Observatory, the Basilica of San Francisco el Grande, the Casa de Correos in Puerta del Sol, the Real Casa de la Aduana, and the General Hospital, which now houses the Reina Sofia Museum and Royal Conservatory of Music. The Paseo del Prado, surrounded by gardens and decorated with neoclassical statues, is an example of urban planning. The Duke of Berwick ordered the construction of the Liria Palace.

In the early 19th century, the Peninsular War, the loss of viceroyalties in the Americas, and continuing coups limited the city's architectural development. The Royal Theatre, the National Library of Spain, the Palace of the Senate, and the Congress were built in this era. The Segovia Viaduct linked the Royal Alcázar to the southern part of town.

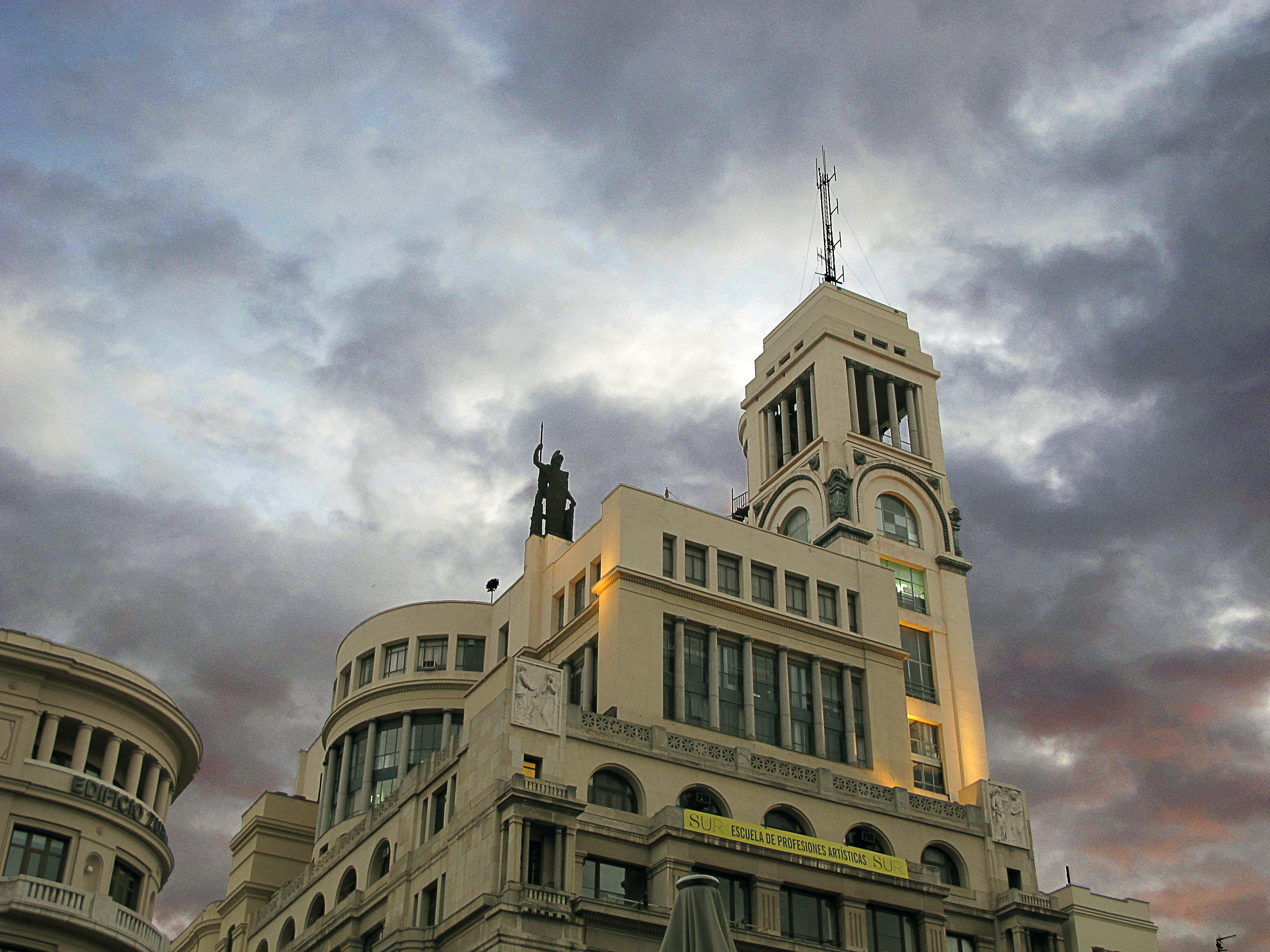
The Círculo de Bellas Artes

A list of key figures of madrilenian architecture during the 19th and 20th centuries includes authors such as Narciso Pascual y Colomer, Francisco Jareño y Alarcón, Francisco de Cubas, Juan Bautista Lázaro de Diego, Ricardo Velázquez Bosco, Antonio Palacios, Secundino Zuazo, Luis Gutiérrez Soto, Luis Moya Blanco and Alejandro de la Sota.

From the mid-19th century until the Civil War, Madrid modernised and built new neighbourhoods and monuments. The expansion of Madrid developed under the Plan Castro, resulting in the neighbourhoods of Salamanca, Argüelles, and Chamberí. Arturo Soria conceived the linear city and built the first few kilometres of the road that bears his name, which embodies the idea. The Gran Vía was built using different styles that evolved over time: French style, eclectic, art deco, and expressionist.

Art Nouveau in Madrid, known as Modernismo was developed at the turn of the century, in concert with its appearance elsewhere in Europe, including Barcelona and Valencia. Antonio Palacios built a series of buildings inspired by the Viennese Secession, such as the Palace of Communication, the Círculo de Bellas Artes, and the Río de La Plata Bank (now Instituto Cervantes). Other notable buildings include the Bank of Spain, the neo-Gothic Almudena Cathedral, Atocha Station, and the Catalan art-nouveau Palace of Longoria. Las Ventas Bullring was built, and the Market of San Miguel.

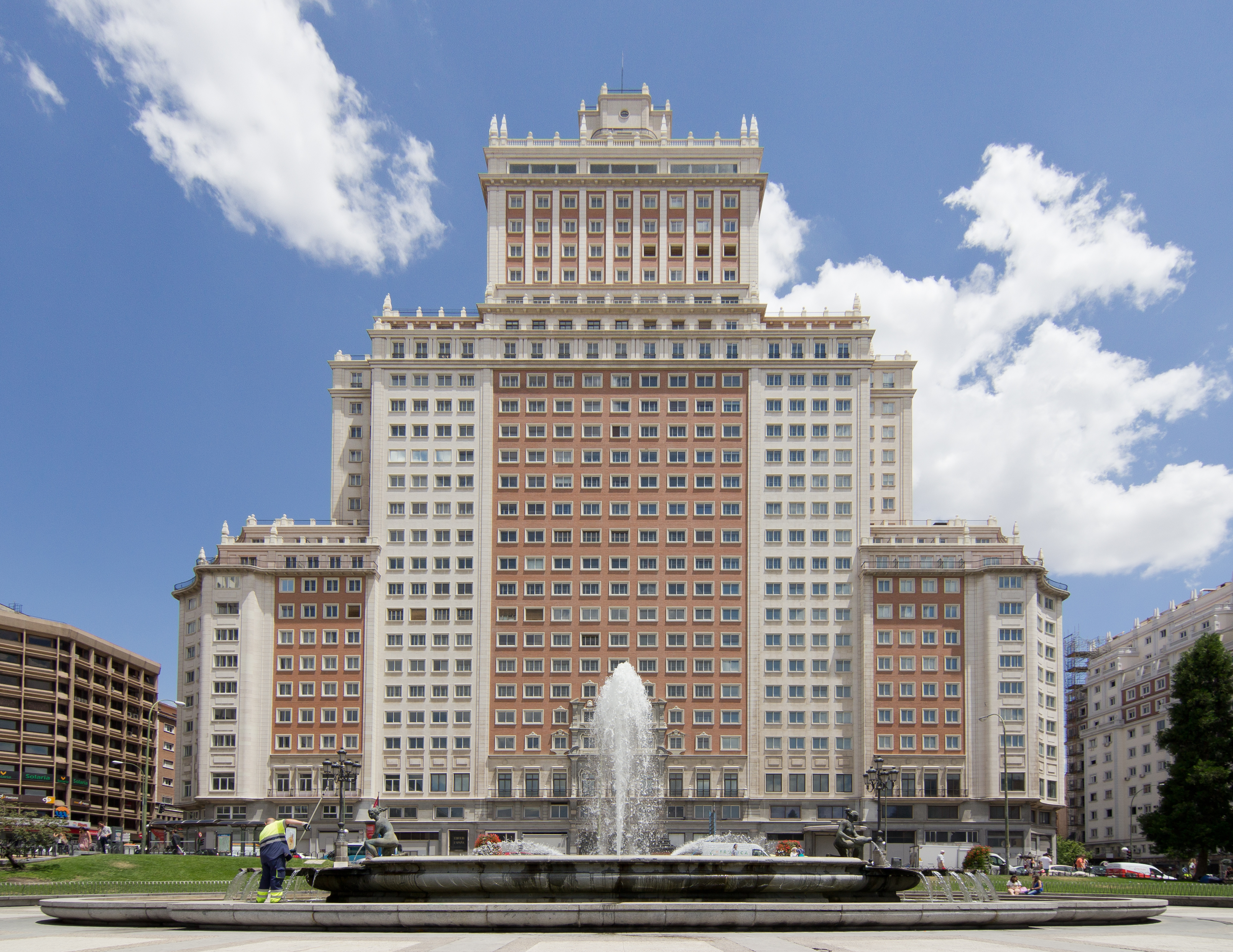
The Edificio España

Following the Francoist takeover that ensued the end of Spanish Civil war, architecture experienced an involution, discarding rationalism and, eclecticism notwithstanding, going back to an overall rather "outmoded" architectural language, with the purpose of turning Madrid into a capital worthy of the "Immortal Spain". Iconic examples of this period include the Ministry of the Air (a case of herrerian revival) and the Edificio España, presented as the tallest building in Europe when it was inaugurated in 1953. Many of these buildings distinctly combine the use of brick and stone in the façades. The Casa Sindical marked a breaking point as it was the first to reassume rationalism, although that relinking to modernity was undertaken through the imitation of the Italian Fascist architecture.

In the late 20th century, with the advent of Spanish economic development, skyscrapers, such as Torre Picasso, Torres Blancas and Torre BBVA, and the Gate of Europe were built. In the 2000s, the four tallest skyscrapers in Spain were built and together form the Cuatro Torres Business Area. Terminal 4 at Madrid-Barajas Airport was inaugurated in 2006 and won several architectural awards. Terminal 4 is one of the world's largest terminal areas and features glass panes and domes in the roof, which allow natural light to pass through.

=== Museums and cultural centres ===
Las Meninas, by Diego Velázquez, 1656, Prado Museum

Madrid is considered one of the top European destinations concerning art museums. Best known is the Golden Triangle of Art, located along the Paseo del Prado and comprising three major museums: the Prado Museum, the Reina Sofía Museum, and the Thyssen-Bornemisza Museum.

The Prado Museum (Museo del Prado) is a museum and art gallery that features one of the world's finest collections of European art, from the 12th century to the early 19th century, based on the former Spanish Royal Collection. It has the best collection of artworks by Goya, Velázquez, El Greco, Rubens, Titian, Hieronymus Bosch, José de Ribera, and Patinir, as well as works by Rogier van der Weyden, Raphael Sanzio, Tintoretto, Veronese, Caravaggio, Van Dyck, Albrecht Dürer, Claude Lorrain, Murillo, and Zurbarán, among others. Some of the standout works exhibited at the museum include Las Meninas, La maja vestida, La maja desnuda, The Garden of Earthly Delights, The Immaculate Conception and The Judgement of Paris.

The Thyssen-Bornemisza Museum (Museo Thyssen-Bornemisza) is an art museum that fills the historical gaps in its counterparts' collections: in the Prado's case, this includes Italian primitives and works from the English, Dutch, and German schools, while in the case of the Reina Sofía, the Thyssen-Bornemisza collection, once the second largest private collection in the world after the British Royal Collection, includes Impressionists, Expressionists, and European and American paintings from the second half of the 20th century, with over 1,600 paintings.

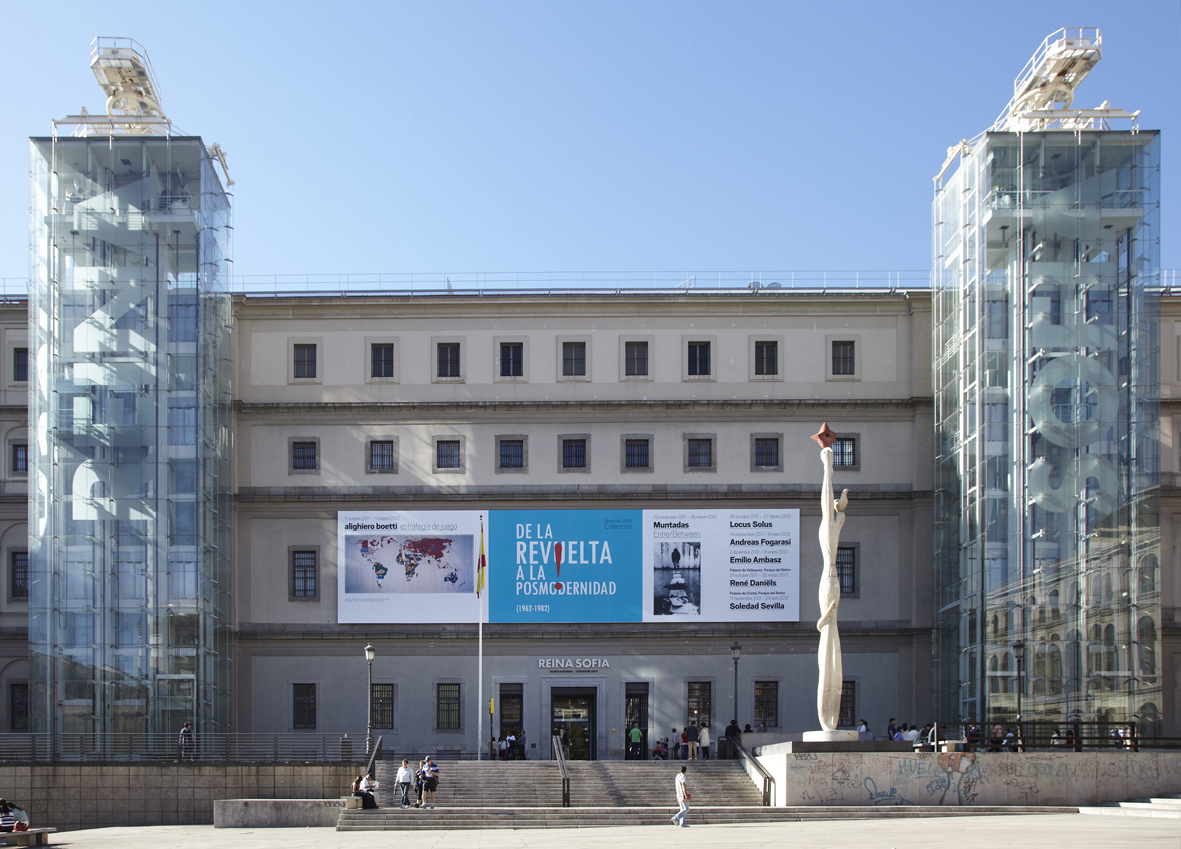
Queen Sofía National Museum Art Centre

The Reina Sofía National Art Museum (Museo Nacional Centro de Arte Reina Sofía; MNCARS) is Madrid's national museum of 20th-century art and houses Pablo Picasso's 1937 anti-war masterpiece, Guernica. Other highlights of the museum, which is mainly dedicated to Spanish art, include excellent collections of Spain's greatest 20th-century masters including Salvador Dalí, Joan Miró, Picasso, Juan Gris, and Julio González. The Reina Sofía also hosts a free-access art library.

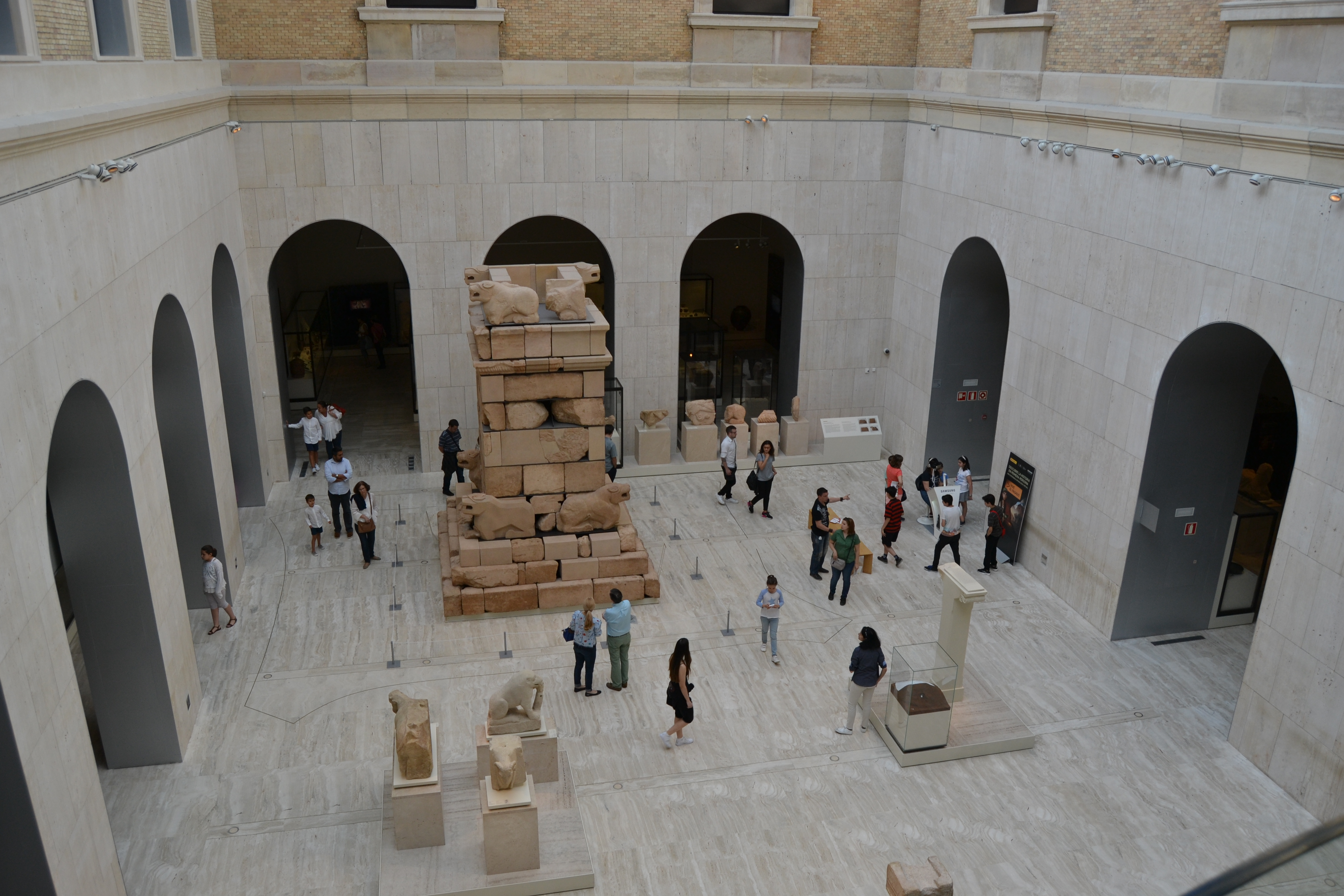
A cloister in the National Archaeological Museum (MAN) showcasing prehistoric items from the Iberian Peninsula, including the Mausoleum of Pozo Moro

The National Archaeological Museum of Madrid (Museo Arqueológico Nacional) shows archaeological finds from Prehistory to the 19th century, including Roman mosaics, Greek ceramics, Islamic art and Romanesque art, especially from the Iberian Peninsula, distributed over three floors. An iconic item in the museum is the Lady of Elche, an Iberian bust from the 4th century BC. Other major pieces include the Lady of Baza, the Lady of Cerro de los Santos, the Lady of Ibiza, the Bicha of Balazote, the Treasure of Guarrazar, the Pyxis of Zamora, the Mausoleum of Pozo Moro and a napier's bones. In addition, the museum has a reproduction of the polychromatic paintings in the Altamira Cave.

The Royal Academy of Fine Arts of San Fernando (Real Academia de Bellas Artes de San Fernando) houses a fine art collection of paintings ranging from the 15th to 20th centuries. The academy is the headquarters of the Madrid Academy of Art. (Note: Francisco Goya was once one of the academy's directors, and its alumni include Pablo Picasso, Salvador Dalí, Antonio López García, Juan Luna, and Fernando Botero.)

CaixaForum Madrid is a post-modern art gallery in the centre of Madrid, next to the Prado Museum.

The Royal Palace of Madrid, a massive building characterised by its luxurious rooms, houses rich collections of armours and weapons, as well as the most comprehensive collection of Stradivarius in the world. The Museo de las Colecciones Reales is a future museum intended to host the most outstanding pieces of the Royal Collections part of the Patrimonio Nacional. Located next to the Royal Palace and the Almudena, Patrimonio Nacional has tentatively scheduled its opening for 2021.

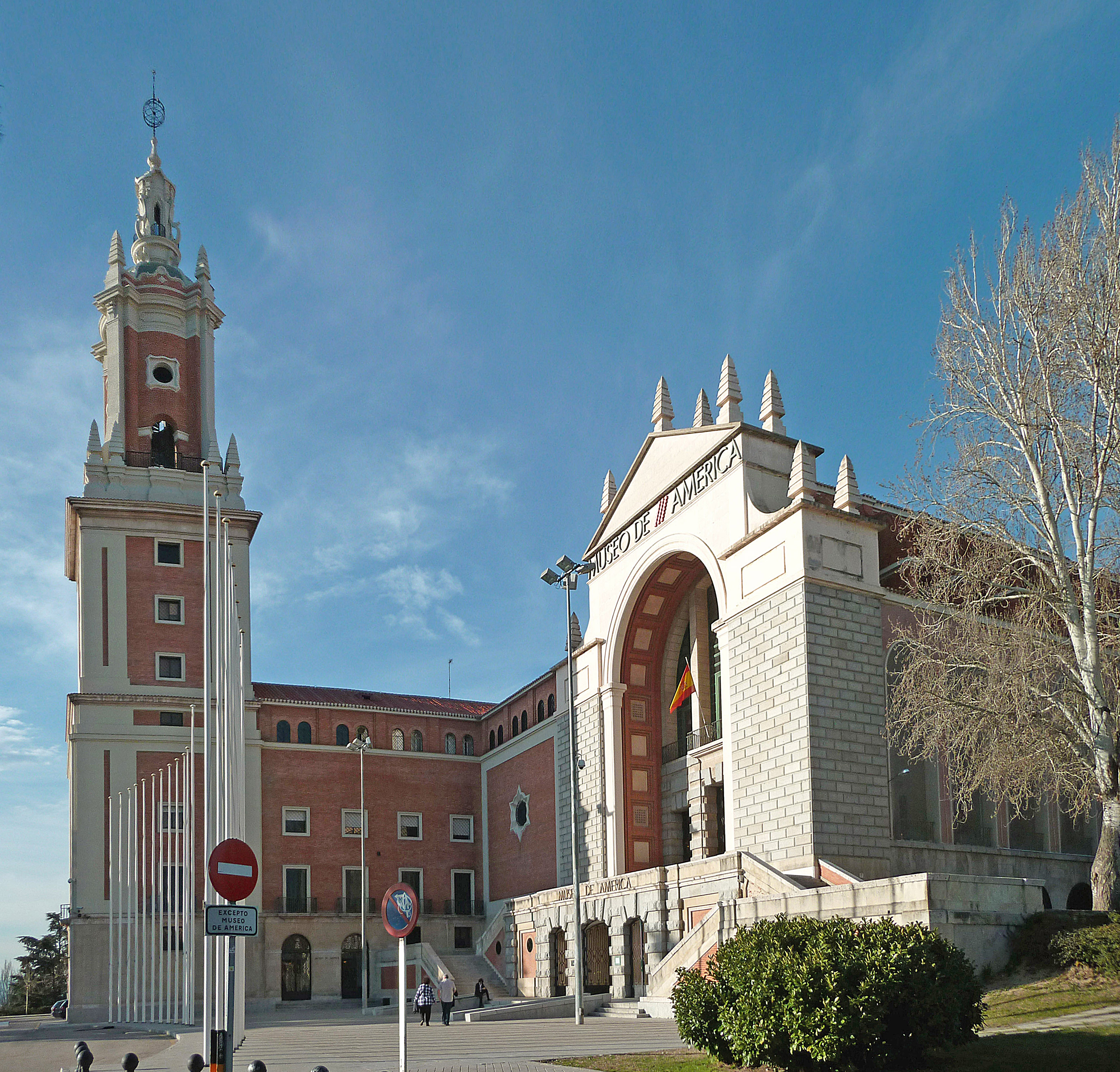
The Museo de América

The Museum of the Americas (Museo de América) is a national museum that holds artistic, archaeological, and ethnographic collections from the Americas, ranging from the Paleolithic period to the present day.

Other notable museums include the National Museum of Natural Sciences (the Spain's national museum of natural history), the Naval Museum, the Convent of Las Descalzas Reales (with many works of Renaissance and Baroque art, and Brussels tapestries inspired by paintings of Rubens), the Museum of Lázaro Galdiano (housing a collection specialising in decorative arts, featuring a collection of weapons that features the sword of Pope Innocent VIII), and the National Museum of Decorative Arts.

Institutions include the National Museum of Romanticism (focused on 19th century Romanticism), the Museum Cerralbo, the National Museum of Anthropology (featuring as highlight a Guanche mummy from Tenerife), the Sorolla Museum (focused in the namesake Valencian Impressionist painter, also including sculptures by Auguste Rodin, part of Sorolla's personal effects), or the History Museum of Madrid (housing pieces related to the local history of Madrid), the Wax Museum of Madrid, and the Railway Museum (located in the building that was once the Delicias Station).

Major cultural centres in the city include the Fine Arts Circle (one of Madrid's oldest arts centres and one of the most important private cultural centres in Europe, hosting exhibitions, shows, film screenings, conferences and workshops), the Conde Duque cultural centre or the Matadero Madrid, a cultural complex (formerly an abattoir) located by the river Manzanares. The Matadero, created in 2006 with the aim of "promoting research, production, learning, and diffusion of creative works and contemporary thought in all their manifestations", is considered the third most valued cultural institution in Madrid among art professionals.

=== Language ===
The usual language in Madrid is Peninsular Spanish. It is in the transition between northern and southern dialects. Typical features are:

- Yeísmo, calló and cayó sound alike among all social classes. According to Alonso Zamora Vicente, yeísmo has extended from Madrid across Spain.
- Aspiration of coda /s/.
- Frequent elision of final /d/ ([maˈðɾi]) and devoicing /θ/ ([maˈðɾiθ]) coexist with the standard preservation ([maˈðɾið]) realised with varying degrees of relaxation.
- Leísmo, laísmo and loísmo. According to Samuel Gili Gaya, in Madrid speech, pronoun le is specialised in the masculine and pronoun la in the feminine, for direct and indirect objects.

The arrival to Madrid of a substantial number of immigrants from Latin America (such as Ecuadorians) has induced processes of dialectal convergence and divergence in the city.

In the 1970s and 1980s, Madrid youth created their own slang, Cheli.

=== Literature ===
Madrid has been one of the great centres of Spanish literature. Some of the most distinguished writers of the Spanish Golden Century were born in Madrid, including Lope de Vega (author of Fuenteovejuna and The Dog in the Manger), who reformed the Spanish theatre, a project continued by Calderon de la Barca (author of Life is a Dream). Francisco de Quevedo, who criticised the Spanish society of his day, and author of El Buscón, and Tirso de Molina, who created the character Don Juan, were born in Madrid. Cervantes and Góngora also lived in the city, although they were not born there. The Madrid homes of Lope de Vega, Quevedo, Gongora, and Cervantes still exist, and they are all in the Barrio de las Letras (Literary Neighbourhood). Other writers born in Madrid in later centuries include Leandro Fernandez de Moratín, Mariano José de Larra, Jose de Echegaray (Nobel Prize in Literature), Ramón Gómez de la Serna, Dámaso Alonso, Enrique Jardiel Poncela and Pedro Salinas.

The "Barrio de las Letras" owes its name to the intense literary activity taking place there during the 16th and 17th centuries. Some of the most prominent writers of the Spanish Golden Age lived here, such as Lope de Vega, Quevedo, and Góngora, and it contained the Cruz and Príncipe Theatres, two of the most important in Spain. At 87 Calle de Atocha, on the northern end of the neighbourhood, was the printing house of Juan de la Cuesta, where the first edition of Don Quixote was typeset and printed in 1604. Most of the literary routes are articulated along the Barrio de las Letras, where you can find scenes from novels of the Siglo de Oro and more recent works like "Bohemian Lights". Although born in Las Palmas de Gran Canaria, realist writer Benito Pérez Galdós made Madrid the setting for many of his stories; there is a giidebook to the Madrid of Galdós (Madrid galdosiano).

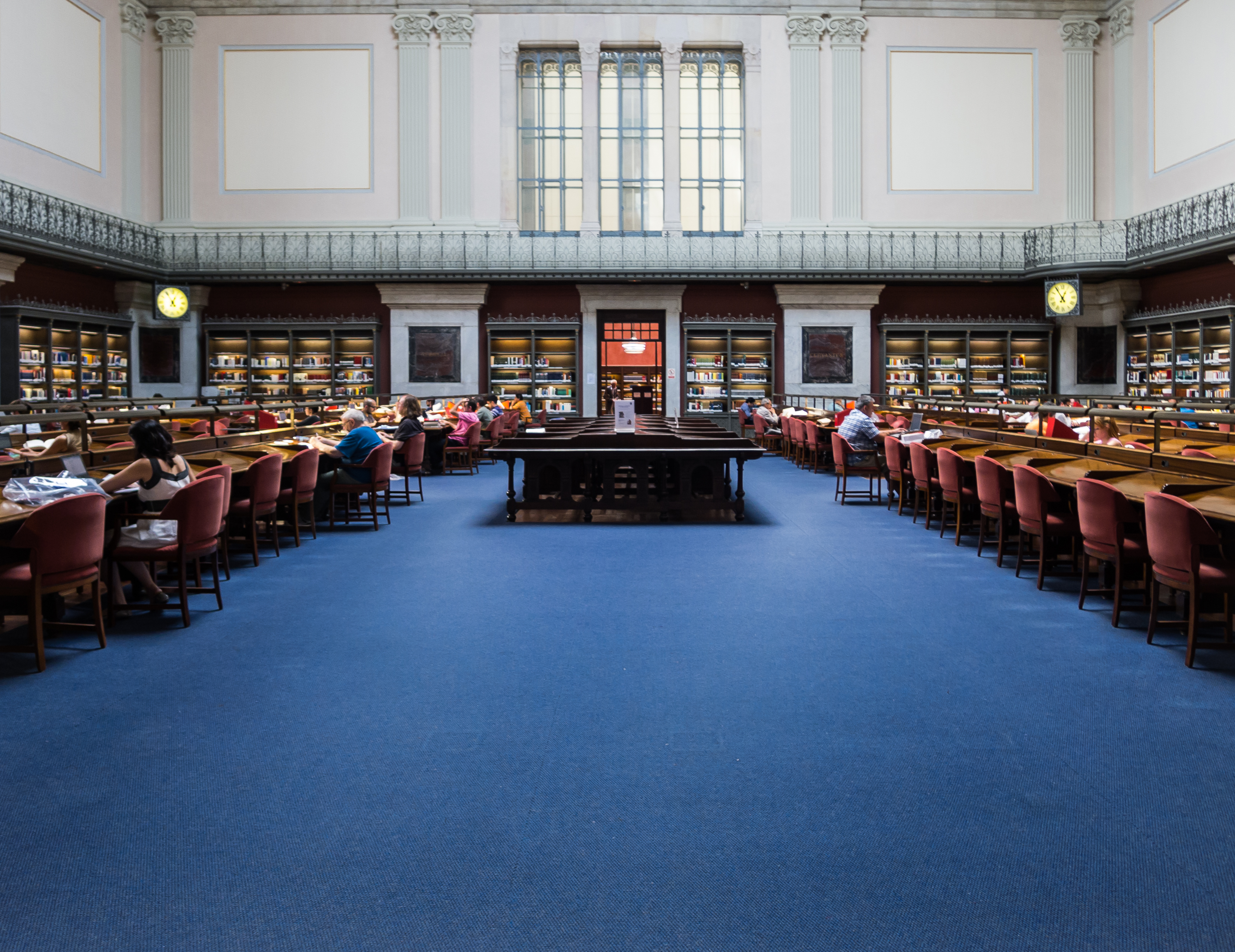
Interior of the National Library of Spain

Madrid is home to the Royal Spanish Academy, the Royal Academy of the Spanish Language, which governs, with statutory authority, over Spanish, preparing, publishing, and updating authoritative reference works on it. The academy's motto (lema, in Spanish) states its purpose: it cleans the language, stabilises it, and gives it brilliance ("Limpia, fija y da resplendor"). Madrid is home to another international cultural institution, the Instituto Cervantes, whose task is the promotion and teaching of the Spanish language as well as the dissemination of the culture of Spain and Hispanic America. The National Library of Spain is the largest major public library in Spain. The library's collection has more than 26,000,000 items, including 15,000,000 books and other printed materials, 30,000 manuscripts, 143,000 newspapers and serials, 4,500,000 graphic materials, 510,000 music scores, 500,000 maps, 600,000 sound recording, 90,000 audiovisuals, 90,000 electronic documents, and more than 500,000 microforms.

=== Cuisine ===
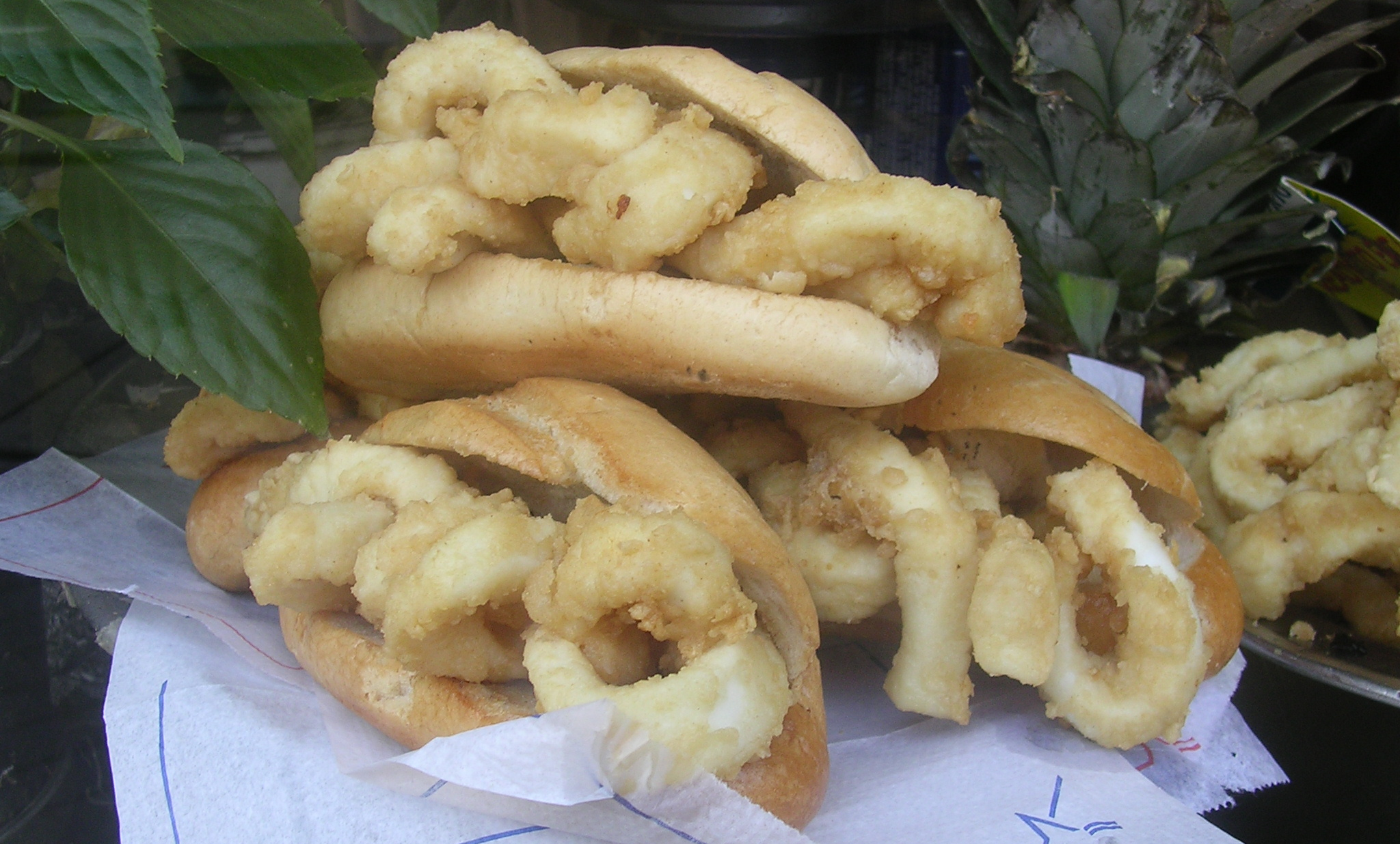
Three squid sandwiches

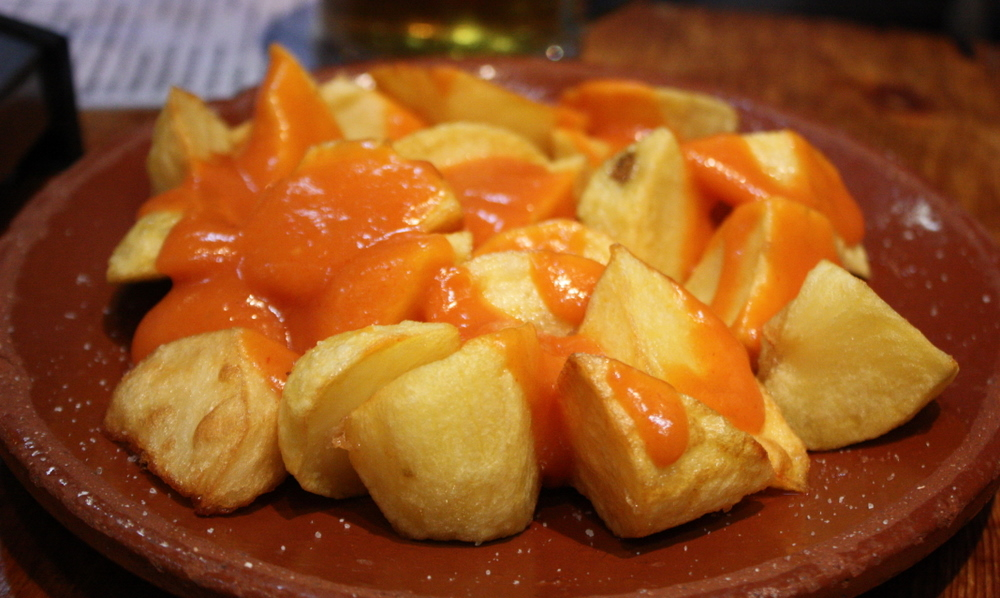
Patatas bravas, a very common bar snack served as tapa

The Madrilenian cuisine has received plenty of influences from other regions of Spain and its own identity actually relies in its ability to assimilate elements from the immigration.

The cocido madrileño, a chickpea-based stew, is one of the most emblematic dishes of the Madrilenian cuisine. The callos a la madrileña is another traditional winter specialty, usually made of cattle tripes. Other offal dishes typical in the city include the gallinejas or grilled pig's ear. Fried squid has become a culinary specialty in Madrid, often consumed in sandwich as bocata de calamares.

Other generic dishes commonly accepted as part of the Madrilenian cuisine include the potaje, the sopa de ajo (Garlic soup), the Spanish omelette, the besugo a la madrileña (bream), caracoles a la madrileña (snails, sp. Cornu aspersum) or the soldaditos de Pavía, the patatas bravas (consumed as snack in bars) or the gallina en pepitoria (hen or chicken cooked with the yolk of hard-boiled eggs and almonds) to name a few.

Traditional desserts include torrijas (a variant of French toast consumed during Easter) and bartolillos.

=== Nightlife ===
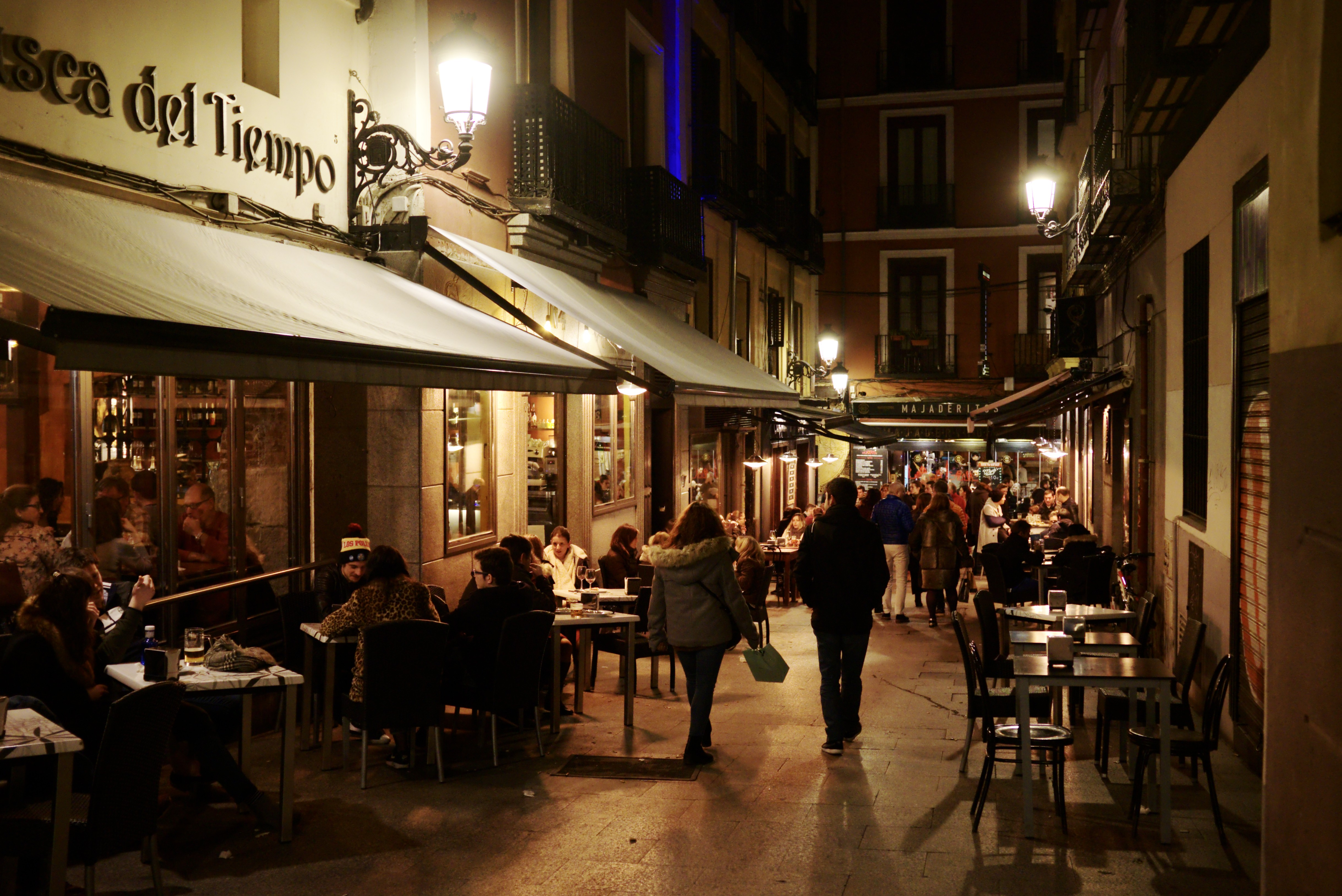
Nightlife in the Centro District

Madrid is known internationally for its highly active, diverse nightlife of bars, dance bars and nightclubs. Madrid is known to have a "vibrant nightlife". Some of the more popular locations include the surroundings of the Plaza de Santa Ana, Malasaña and La Latina (particularly near the Cava Baja). It is one of the city's main attractions with tapas bars, cocktail bars, clubs, jazz lounges, live music venues and flamenco theatres. Most nightclubs liven up by 1:30 a.m. and stay open until at least 6 a.m.

Nightlife flourished in the 1980s while Madrid's mayor Enrique Tierno Galván (PSOE) was in office, nurturing the cultural-musical movement known as La Movida. Nowadays, the Malasaña area is known for its alternative scene.

The area of Chueca has also become a hot spot in the Madrilenian nightlife, especially for the gay population. Chueca is known as gay quarter, comparable to the Castro District in San Francisco.

=== Bohemian culture ===
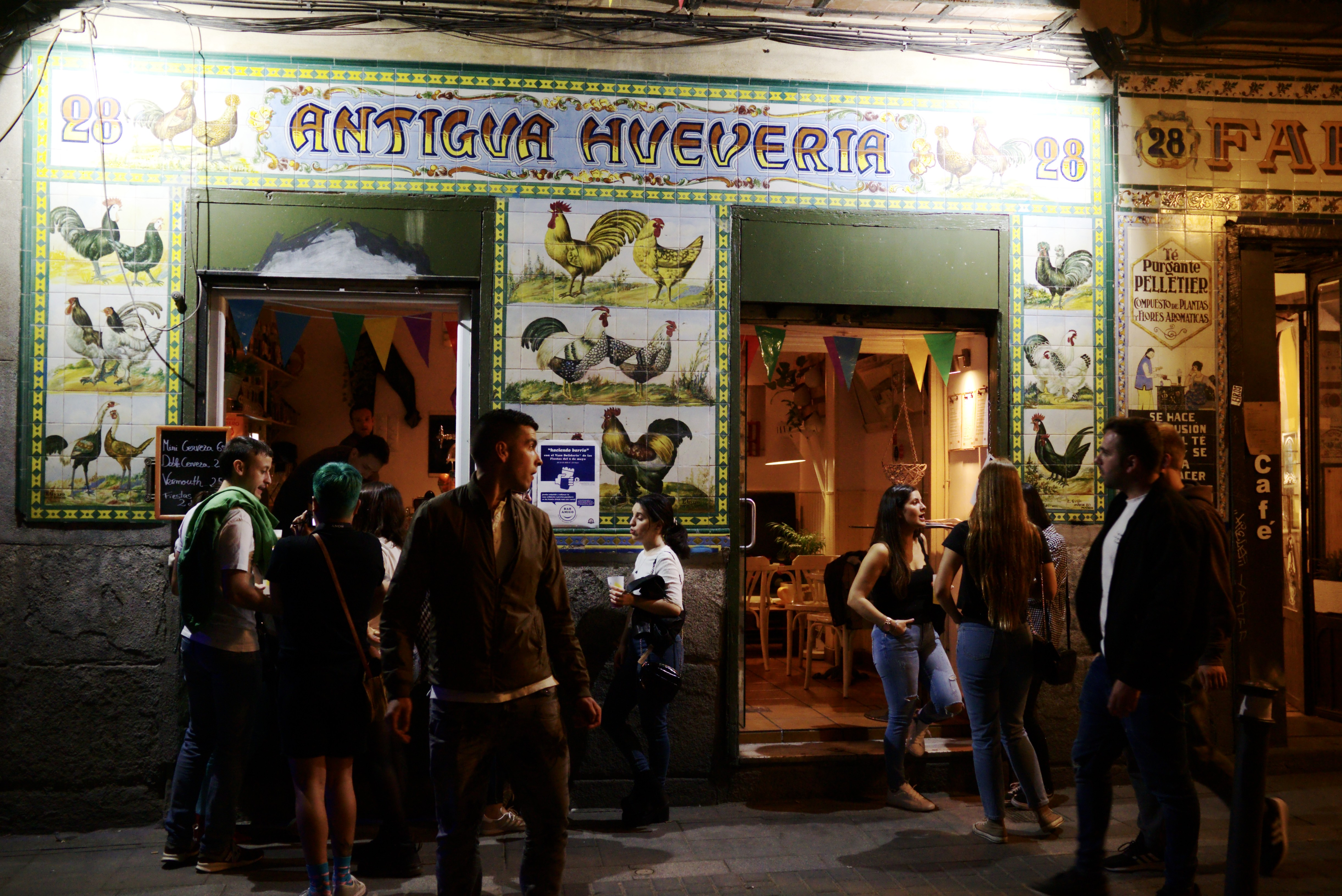
Nights in Malasaña are often crowded.

The city has venues for performing alternative art and expressive art. They are mostly located in the centre of the city, including in Ópera, Antón Martín, Chueca and Malasaña. There are also several festivals in Madrid, including the Festival of Alternative Art, and the Festival of the Alternative Scene.

The neighbourhood of Malasaña, as well as Antón Martín and Lavapiés, hosts several bohemian cafés/galleries. These cafés are typified with period or retro furniture or furniture found on the street, a colourful, nontraditional atmosphere inside, and usually art displayed each month by a new artist, often for sale. Cafés include the retro café Lolina and bohemian cafés La Ida, La Paca and Café de la Luz in Malasaña, La Piola in Huertas and Café Olmo and Aguardiente in Lavapiés.

In the neighbourhood of Lavapiés, there are also "hidden houses", which are illegal bars or abandoned spaces where concerts, poetry readings and the famous Spanish botellón (a street party or gathering that is now illegal but rarely stopped).

=== Classical music and opera ===
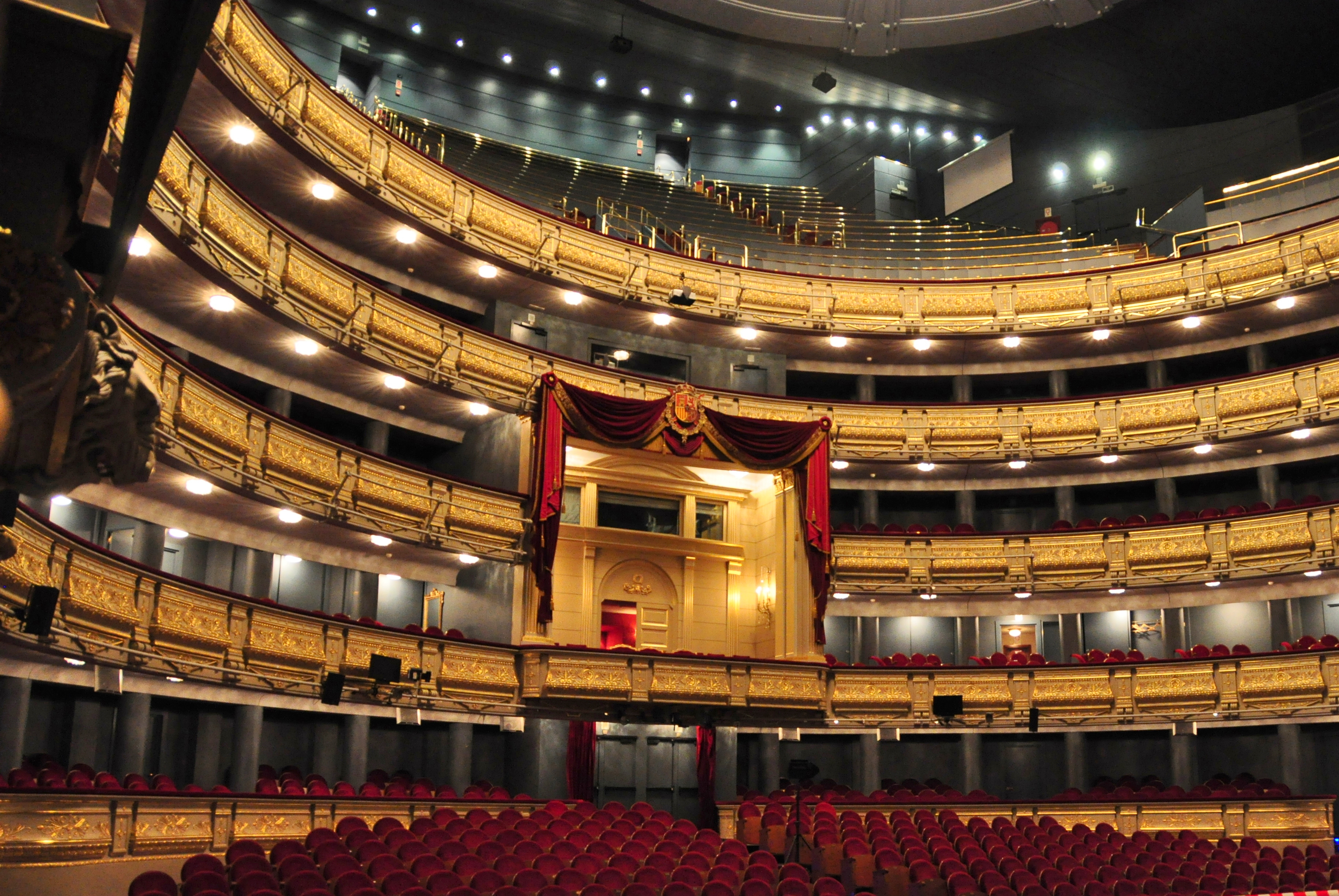
The Teatro Real

The Auditorio Nacional de Música is the main venue for classical music concerts in Madrid. It is home to the Spanish National Orchestra, the Chamartín Symphony Orchestra and the venue for the symphonic concerts of the Community of Madrid Orchestra and the Madrid Symphony Orchestra. It is also the principal venue for orchestras on tour playing in Madrid.

The Teatro Real is the main opera house in Madrid, located just in front of the Royal Palace, and its resident orchestra is the Madrid Symphony Orchestra. The theatre stages around seventeen opera titles (both own productions and co-productions with other major European opera houses) per year, as well as two or three major ballets and several recitals.

The Teatro de la Zarzuela is mainly devoted to Zarzuela (the Spanish traditional musical theatre genre), as well as operetta and recitals. The resident orchestra of the theatre is the Community of Madrid Orchestra.

The Teatro Monumental is the concert venue of the RTVE Symphony Orchestra.

Other concert venues for classical music are the Fundación Joan March and the Auditorio 400, devoted to contemporary music.

=== Feasts and festivals ===
==== San Isidro ====
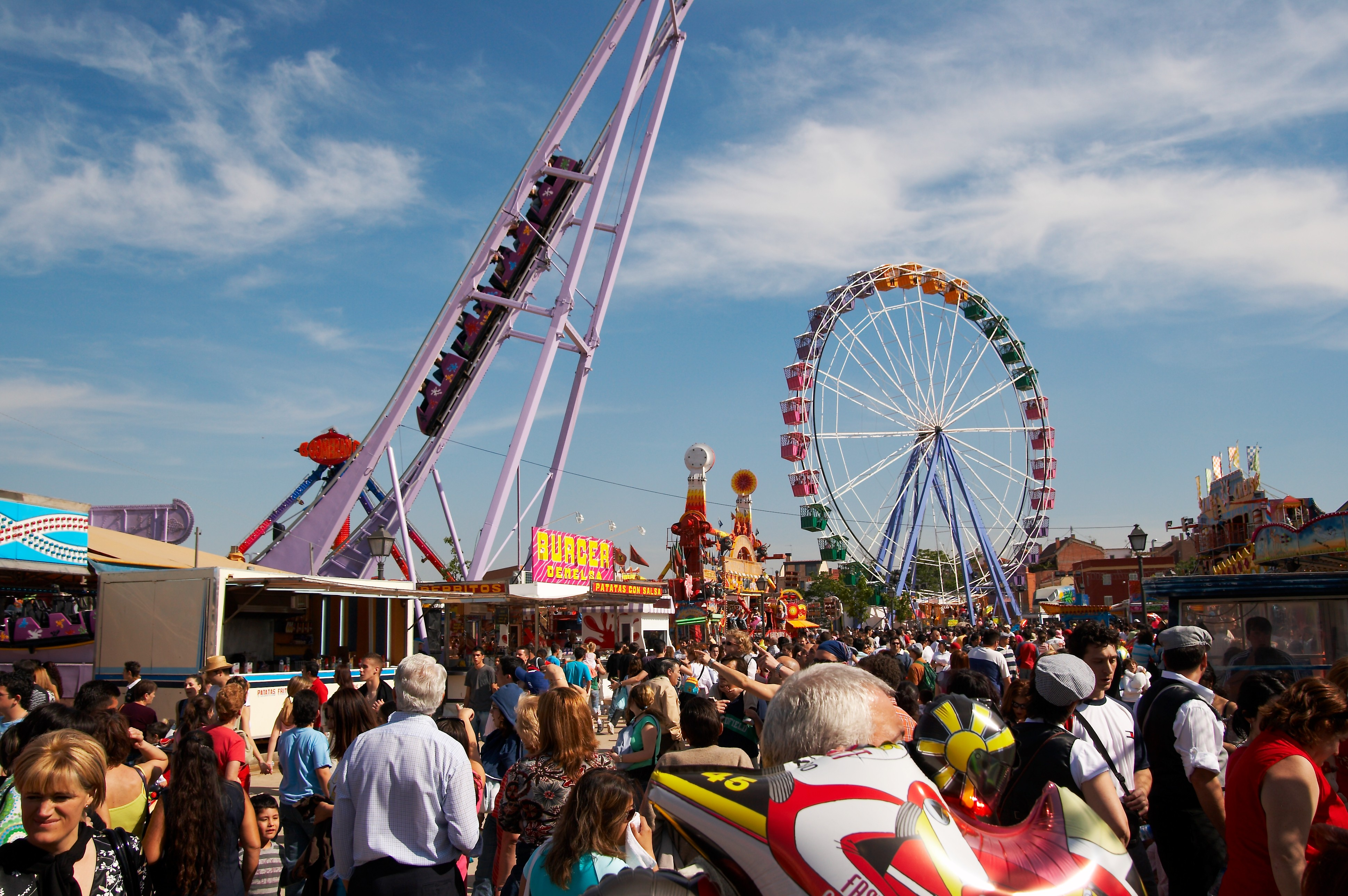
Festivities of San Isidro Labrador in the pradera, 2007

The local feast (fiesta patronal) observed with a day off if falling on a work day is the Feast of Saint Isidore the Laborer (Fiestas de San Isidro Labrador), the patron Saint of Madrid, celebrated every 15 May. It is a public holiday. According to tradition, Isidro was a farmworker and well manufacturer born in Madrid in the late 11th century, who lived a pious life and whose corpse was reportedly found to be incorrupt in 1212. Already very popular among the Madrilenian people, as Madrid became the capital of the Hispanic Monarchy in 1561 the town council pulled efforts to promote his canonisation; the process started in 1562. Isidro was beatified in 1619 and the feast day set on 15 May (he was finally canonised in 1622).

On 15 May the Madrilenian people gather around the Hermitage of San Isidro and the Prairie of San Isidro (on the right-bank of the Manzanares) often dressed with checkered caps (parpusas) and kerchiefs (safos) characteristic of the chulapos and chulapas, dancing chotis and pasodobles, eating rosquillas and barquillos.

==== LGBT pride ====
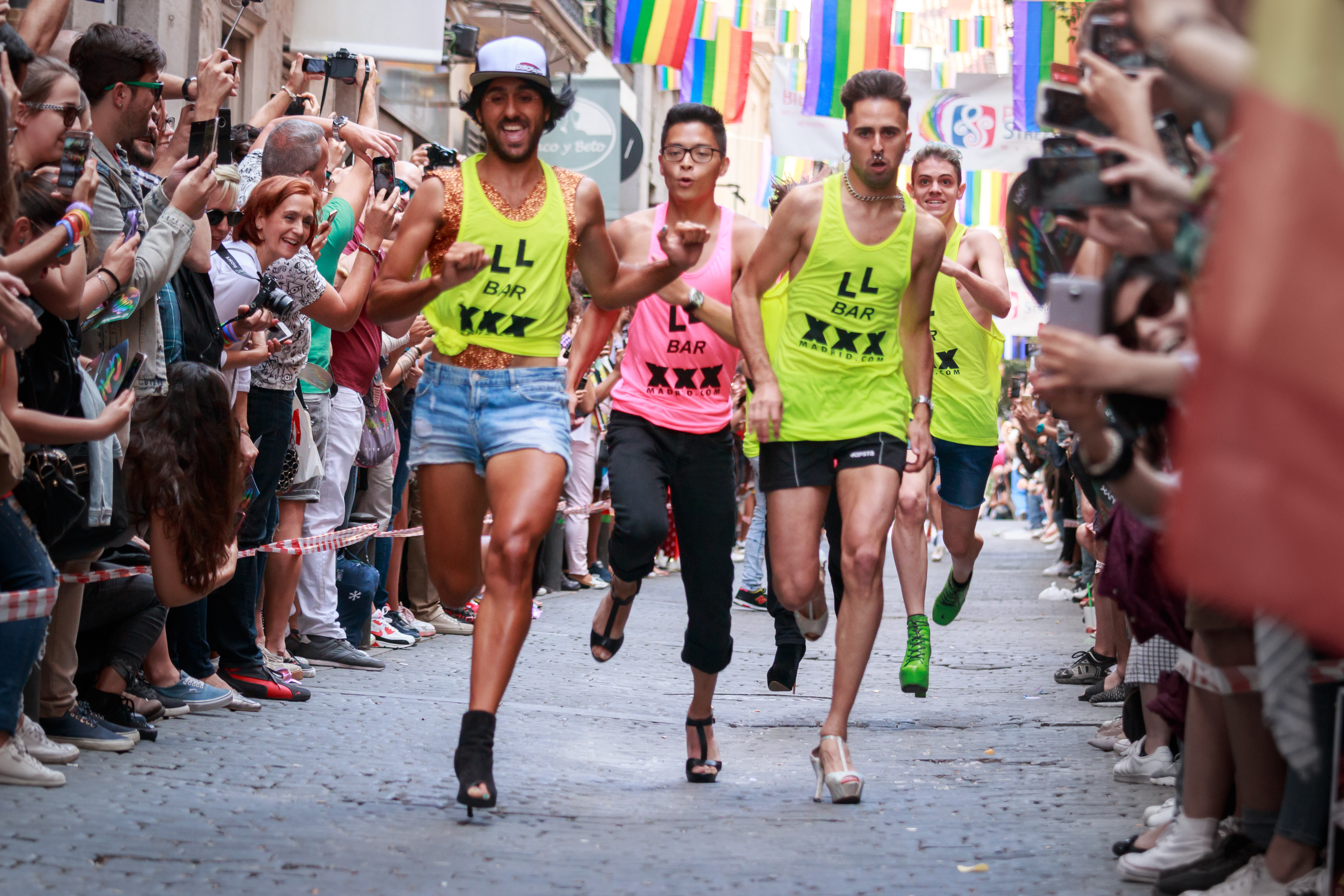
High heels race in WorldPride Madrid 2017

The Madrilenian LGBT Pride has become a popular event in the community both in the city and worldwide.

Madrid's Pride Parade began in 1977, in the Chueca neighbourhood, which also marked the beginning of the gay, lesbian, transgender, and bisexual rights movement after being repressed for forty years in a dictatorship. This claiming of LGBT rights has allowed the Pride Parade in Madrid to grow year after year, becoming one of the best in the world. In 2007, this was recognised by the European Pride Organisers Association (EPOA) when Madrid hosted EuroPride. It was hailed by the then President of the EPOA as "the best EuroPride in history".

In 2017, Madrid celebrated the 40th anniversary of their first Pride Parade by hosting the WorldPride Madrid 2017. Numerous conferences, seminars and workshops as well as cultural and sports activities took place at the festival, the event being a "kids and family pride" and a source of education. More than one million people attended the pride's central march. The main purpose of the celebration was presenting Madrid and the Spanish society in general as a multicultural, diverse, and tolerant community. The 2018 Madrid Pride roughly had 1.5 million participants.^{p. 34}

Since Spain legalised same-sex marriage in July 2005, Madrid has become one of the largest hot spots for LGBT culture. With about 500 businesses aimed toward the LGBT community, Madrid has become a "Gateway of Diversity".

==== Other ====
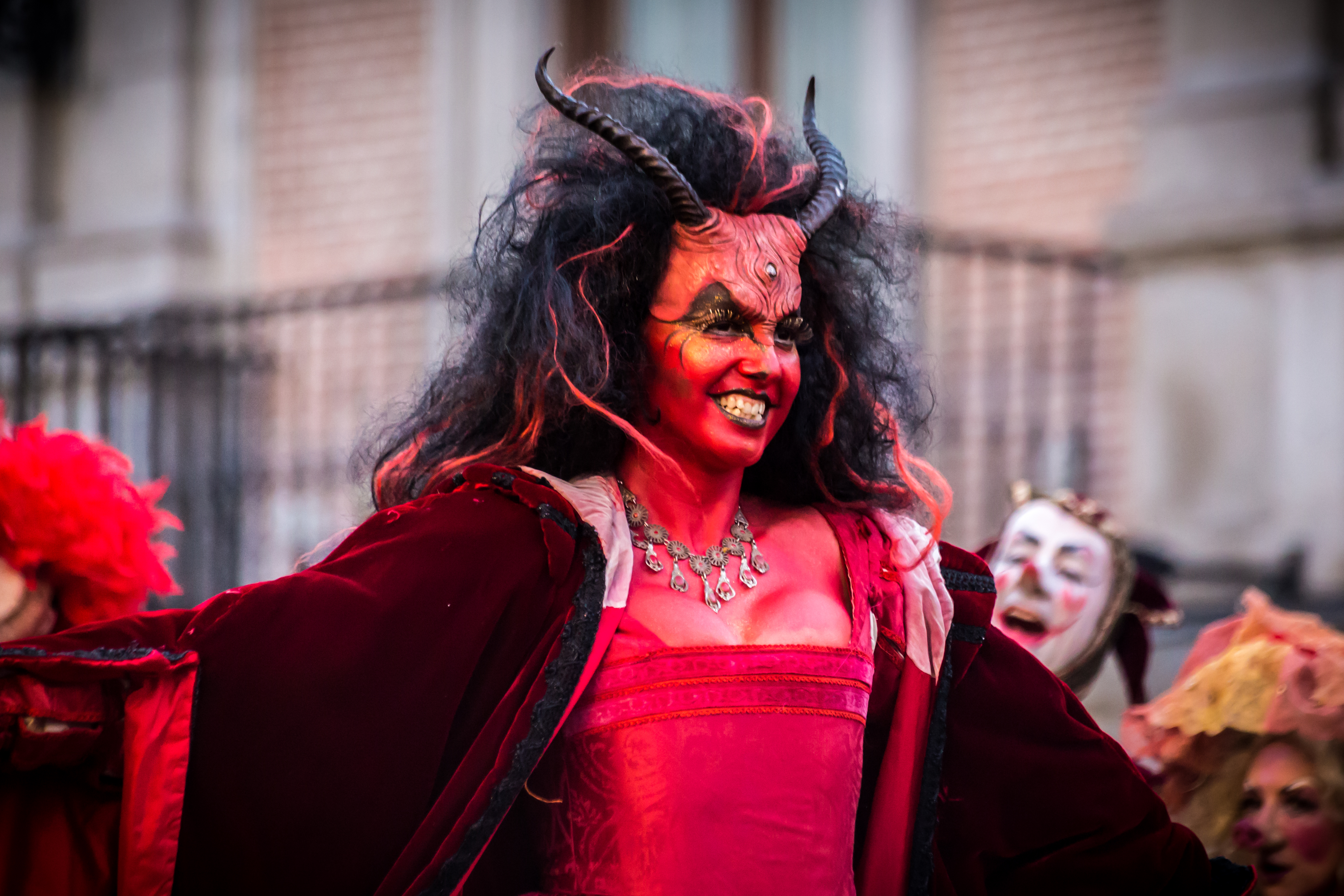
People in costumes during the proclamation (pregón) of the 2013 Carnival

Despite often being labelled as "having no tradition" by foreigners, the Carnival was popular in Madrid already in the 16th century. However, during the Francoist dictatorship the carnival was under government ban and the feasts suffered a big blow. It has been slowly recovering since then.

Other signalled days include the regional day (2 May) commemorating the Dos de Mayo Uprising (a public holiday), the feasts of San Antonio de la Florida (13 June), the feast of the Virgen de la Paloma (circa 15 August) or the day of the co-patron of Madrid, the Virgin of Almudena (9 November), although the latter's celebrations are rather religious in nature.

The most important musical event in the city is the Mad Cool festival; created in 2016, it reached an attendance of 240,000 during the three-day long schedule of the 2018 edition.^{p. 33}

=== Bullfighting ===
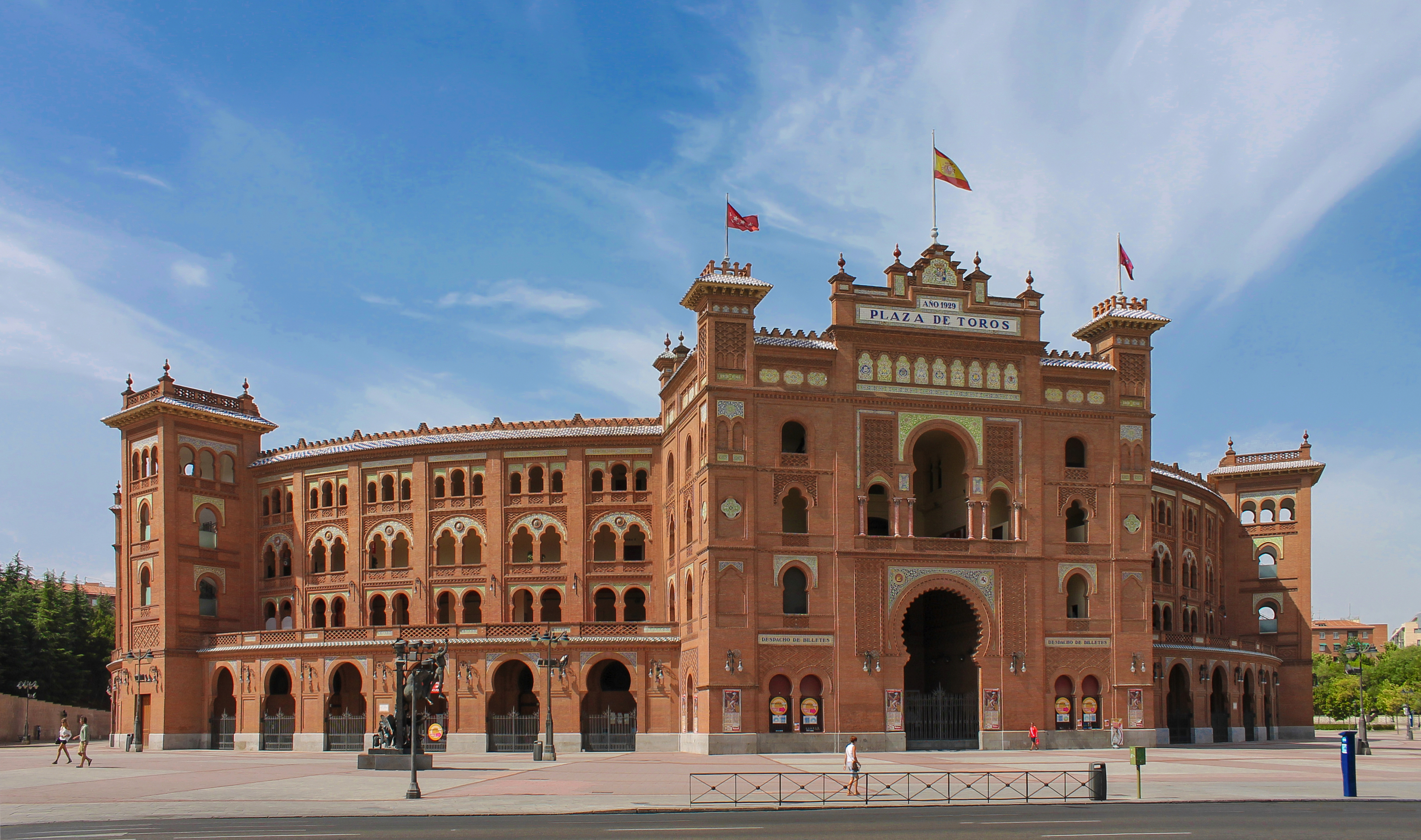
View of Las Ventas bullring in Madrid from Calle de Alcalá

Madrid hosts the largest plaza de toros (bullring) in Spain, Las Ventas, established in 1929. Las Ventas is considered by many to be the world centre of bullfighting and has a seating capacity of almost 25,000. Madrid's bullfighting season begins in March and ends in October. Bullfights are held every day during the festivities of San Isidro (Madrid's patron saint) from mid May to early June, and every Sunday, and public holiday, the rest of the season. The style of the plaza is Neo-Mudéjar. Las Ventas also hosts music concerts and other events outside of the bullfighting season. There is great controversy in Madrid with bullfighting.

=== Sport ===
==== Football ====
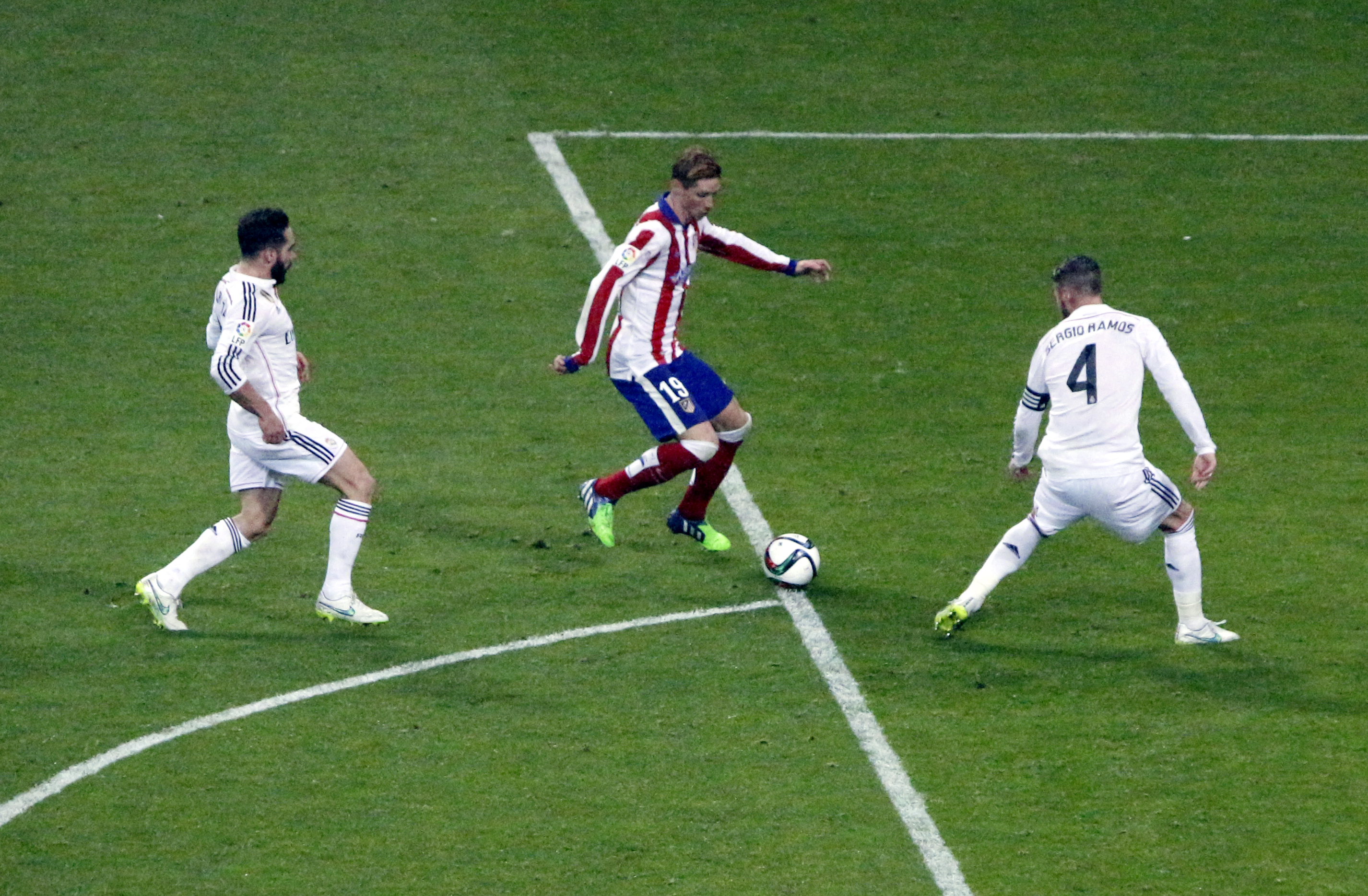
The Madrid Derby at the Santiago Bernabéu Stadium, January 2015

Real Madrid, founded in 1902, compete in La Liga and play their home games at the Santiago Bernabéu Stadium. The club is one of the most widely supported teams in the world and their supporters are referred to as Madridistas or Merengues (Meringues). Real's supporters in Madrid are often believed to be constituted principally of members of the middle classes, however, this claim is in dispute and has not been proved. It has also been suggested that a large proportion of Real Madrid's fans are members of the working class. The club was selected as the best club of the 20th century, being the fifth most valuable sports club in the world and the most successful Spanish football club with a total of 104 official titles (this includes a record 15 European Cups and a record 36 La Liga trophies).

Atlético Madrid, founded in 1903, also compete in La Liga and play their home games at the Metropolitano Stadium. The club is well-supported in the city, having the third national fan base in Spain and their supporters are referred to as Atléticos or Colchoneros (The Mattressers). Atlético is believed to draw its support mostly from working class citizens. The club is considered an elite European team, having won three UEFA Europa League titles and reached three European Cup finals. Domestically, Atletico have won eleven league titles and ten Copa del Reys.

Rayo Vallecano, founded in 1924, are the third most important football team of the city, based in the Vallecas neighbourhood. They currently compete in La Liga, having secured promotion in 2021. The club's fans tend to be very left-wing and are known as Buccaneers.

Getafe CF, founded in 1983, also compete in La Liga and play their home games at the Estadio Coliseum. The club was promoted to La Liga for the first time in 2004, and participated in the top level of Spanish football for twelve years between 2004 and 2016, and again since 2017.

CD Leganés, founded in 1928, compete in Segunda División and play their home games at the Estadio Municipal de Butarque. In the 2015–16 season, for the first time in their history, Leganés earned promotion to La Liga. They remained in the top flight for four seasons, reaching a peak of 13th in 2018–19, before relegation in the last game of the following season, a 2–2 home draw with Real Madrid.

Madrid has hosted five European Cup/Champions League finals: four at the Santiago Bernabéu, and the 2019 final at the Metropolitano. The Bernabéu also hosted the Euro 1964 Final (which Spain won) and the 1982 FIFA World Cup Final.

==== Basketball ====
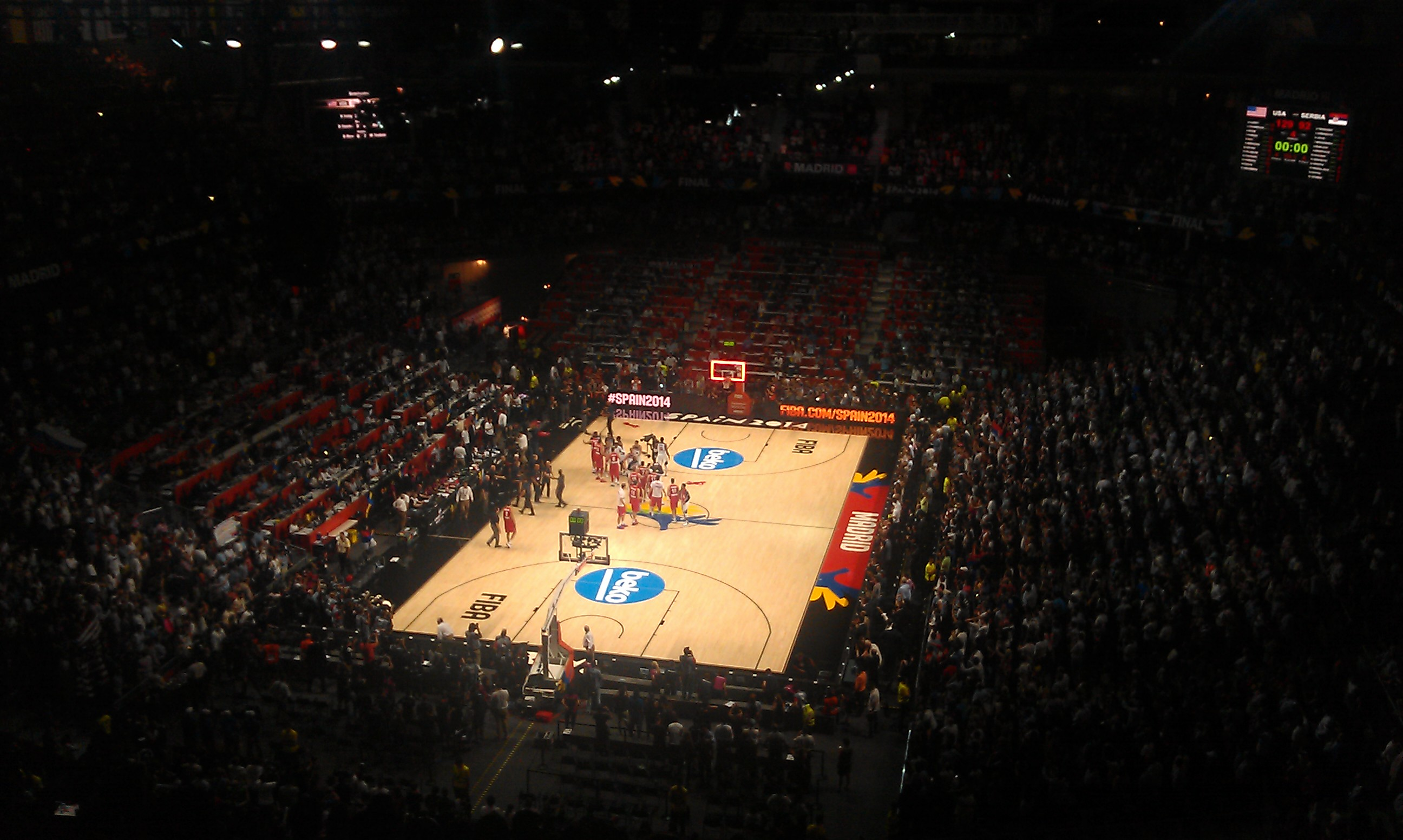
The 2014 FIBA Basketball World Cup Final at the Palacio de Deportes

Real Madrid Baloncesto, founded in 1931, compete in Liga ACB and play their home games at the Palacio de Deportes (WiZink Center). Real Madrid's basketball section, similar to its football team, is the most successful team in Europe, with a record 11 EuroLeague titles. Domestically, they have clinched a record 36 league titles and a record 28 Copa del Reys.

Club Baloncesto Estudiantes, founded in 1948, compete in LEB Oro and also play their home games at the Palacio de Deportes (WiZink Center). Until 2021, Estudiantes was one of only three teams that have never been relegated from Spain's top division. Historically, its achievements include three cup titles and four league runners-up placements.

Madrid has hosted six European Cup/EuroLeague finals, the last two at the Palacio de Deportes. The city also hosted the final matches for the 1986 and 2014 FIBA World Cups, and the EuroBasket 2007 final (all held at the Palacio de Deportes).

==== Events ====
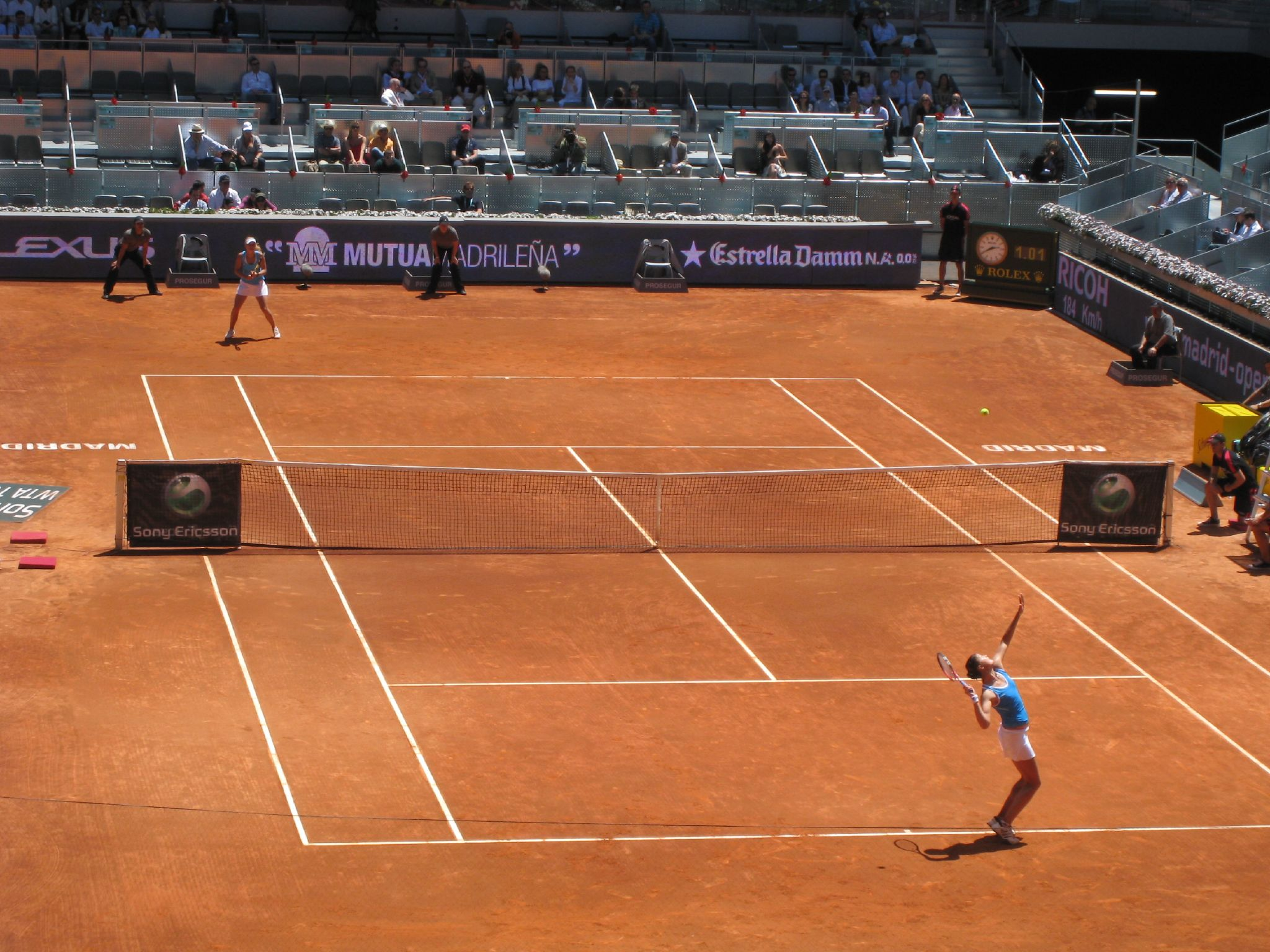
The 2009 Madrid Open Women's Final at the Caja Mágica

The main annual international event in cycling, the Vuelta a España (La Vuelta), is one of the three worldwide prestigious three-week-long Grand Tours, and its final stages takes place in Madrid on the first Sunday of September. In tennis, the city hosts Madrid Open, both male and female versions, played on clay court. The event is part of the nine ATP Masters 1000 and nine WTA 1000 tournaments. It is held during the first week of May in the Caja Mágica. Additionally, Madrid hosts the finals of the major tournament for men's national teams, Davis Cup, since 2019.

==== Formula One ====
In January 2024, Formula One announced that Madrid will host the 2026 Spanish Grand Prix around the IFEMA exhibition centre in Campo de las Naciones. It was later confirmed that the FIA Formula 2 Championship and FIA Formula 3 Championship would also race that weekend.

== Education ==
Education in Spain is free, and compulsory from 6 to 16 years. The education system is called LOE (Ley Orgánica de Educación).

=== Universities ===
Madrid is home to many public and private universities. Some of them are among the oldest in the world, and many of them are the most prestigious universities in Spain.

The National Distance Education University (Universidad Nacional de Educación a Distancia; UNED) has as its mission the public service of higher education through the modality of distance education. At more than 205,000 students (2015), UNED has the largest student population in Spain and is one of the largest universities in Europe. Since 1972, UNED has sought to translate into action the principle of equal opportunity in access to higher education through a methodology based on the principles of distance learning and focused on the needs of the student.

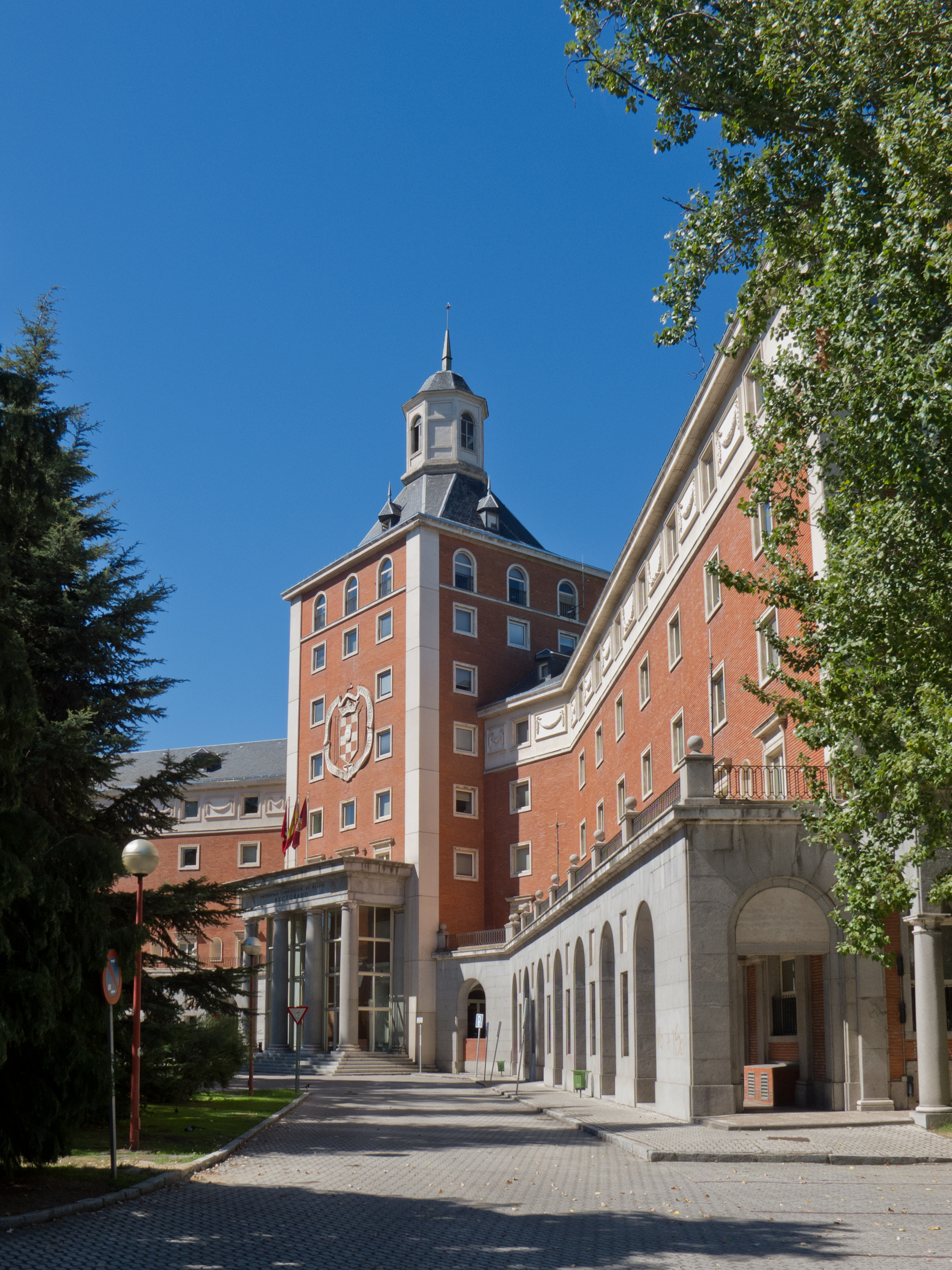
The rectorate of the Complutense University of Madrid

The Complutense University of Madrid (Universidad Complutense de Madrid; UCM) is the second largest university in Spain after UNED and one of the oldest universities in the world. It has over 11,000 staff members and a student population of 117,000. Most of the academic staff is Spanish. It is located on two campuses, the main one of Ciudad Universitaria in the Moncloa-Aravaca district, and the secondary campus of Somosaguas, located outside the city limits in Pozuelo de Alarcón and founded in 1971.

The Complutense University of Madrid was founded in Alcalá de Henares, old Complutum, by Cardinal Cisneros in 1499. Its real origin dates back to 1293, when King Sancho IV of Castile built the General Schools of Alcalá, which would give rise to Cisnero's Complutense University. Between 1509 and 1510, five schools were already operative: Artes y Filosofía (Arts and Philosophy), Teología (Theology), Derecho Canónico (Canonical Laws), Letras (Liberal Arts) and Medicina (Medicine). In 1836, during the reign of Isabel II, the university was moved to Madrid, where it took the name of Central University and was located at San Bernardo Street.

In 1927, a new University City (Ciudad Universitaria) was planned to be built in the district of Moncloa-Aravaca, in lands handed over by the King Alfonso XIII to this purpose. The Spanish Civil War turned the University City into a war zone, causing the destruction of several schools in the area, as well as the loss of part of its rich scientific, artistic and bibliographic heritage. In 1970 the Government reformed higher education, and the Central University became the Complutense University of Madrid. A new campus at Somosaguas was created to house the new School of Social Sciences. In 1977, the old Alcalá campus was reopened as the independent UAH, University of Alcalá. Complutense also serves a population of students who select Madrid for their study abroad period. Students from the United States, for example, might go to Madrid on a program like API (Academic Programs International) and study at Complutense for an intense immersion in the Spanish language. After studying at the university, students return home with fluency in Spanish and an enhanced understanding of culture and diversity.

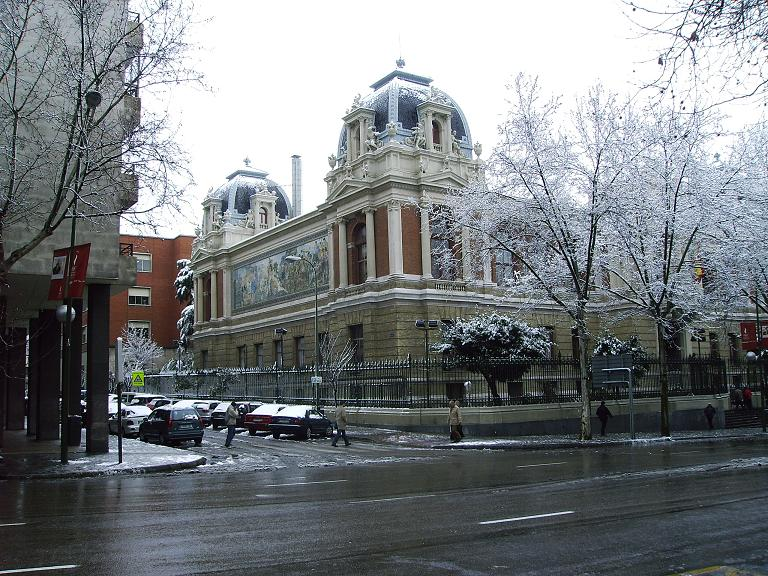
The School of Mines, Technical University of Madrid

The Technical University of Madrid (Universidad Politécnica de Madrid; UPM), is the top technical university in Spain. It is the result of the merger of different Technical Schools of Engineering. It shares the Ciudad Universitaria campus with the UCM, and owns several schools scattered in the city centre and campuses in the Puente de Vallecas district and in the neighbouring municipality of Boadilla del Monte.

The Autonomous University of Madrid (Universidad Autónoma de Madrid; UAM) was instituted under the leadership of the physicist, Nicolás Cabrera. The Autonomous University is widely recognised for its research strengths in theoretical physics. Known simply as La Autónoma by locals, its main site is the Cantoblanco Campus, located in the north of the municipality, close to its boundaries with the neighbouring municipalities of Alcobendas, San Sebastián de los Reyes and Tres Cantos.

Located on the main site are the Rectorate building and the Faculties of Science, Philosophy and Fine Arts, Law, Economic Science and Business Studies, Psychology, Higher School of Computing Science and Engineering, and the Faculty of Teacher Training and Education. The UAM is considered the institution to study law in Spain, The Medical School is outside the main site and beside the Hospital Universitario La Paz.

The private Comillas Pontifical University (Universidad Pontificia Comillas, UPC) has its rectorate and several faculties in Madrid. The private Nebrija University is also based in Madrid. Some of the large public universities headquartered in the surrounding municipalities also have secondary campuses in Madrid proper: it is the case of the Charles III University of Madrid (Universidad Carlos III de Madrid, UC3M) with its main site in Getafe and an educational facility in Embajadores. The King Juan Carlos University (Universidad Rey Juan Carlos, URJC) has its main site in Móstoles and a secondary campus in Vicálvaro. The private Camilo José Cela University (Universidad Camilo José Cela, UCJC) has a postgraduate school in Chamberí.

=== Business schools ===
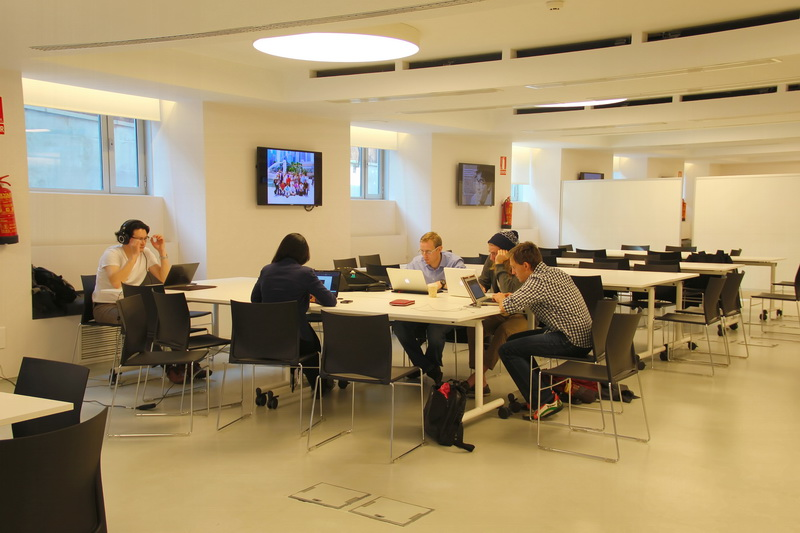
Students of the IE Business School

IE Business School (formerly Instituto de Empresa) has its main campus on the border of the Chamartín and Salamanca districts of Madrid. IE Business School recently ranked #1 in WSJ's 2009 rankings for Best MBA Programs under 2 years. It scored ahead of usual stalwarts, INSEAD and IMD, giving it top billing among International MBA programs. Although based in Barcelona, both IESE Business School and ESADE Business School also have Madrid campuses.

These three schools are the highest-ranked business schools in Spain, consistently ranked among the top 20 business schools globally, and offer MBA programs, in English or Spanish, among other degrees. Madrid is a common destination for business schools and frequented by foreign students. Some Spanish business schools (IESE, IE, ESADE) have invested 125 million euros in expanding their campuses in Madrid in 2020.

Other Madrid business schools and universities that have MBA programs include: EAE Business School (in English and Spanish), the Charles III University of Madrid through the Centro de Ampliación de Estudios (in English or Spanish); the Comillas Pontifical University (in Spanish only) and the Technical University of Madrid (in Spanish only).

== Transport ==
In 2018, Madrid banned all non-resident vehicles from its downtown areas.

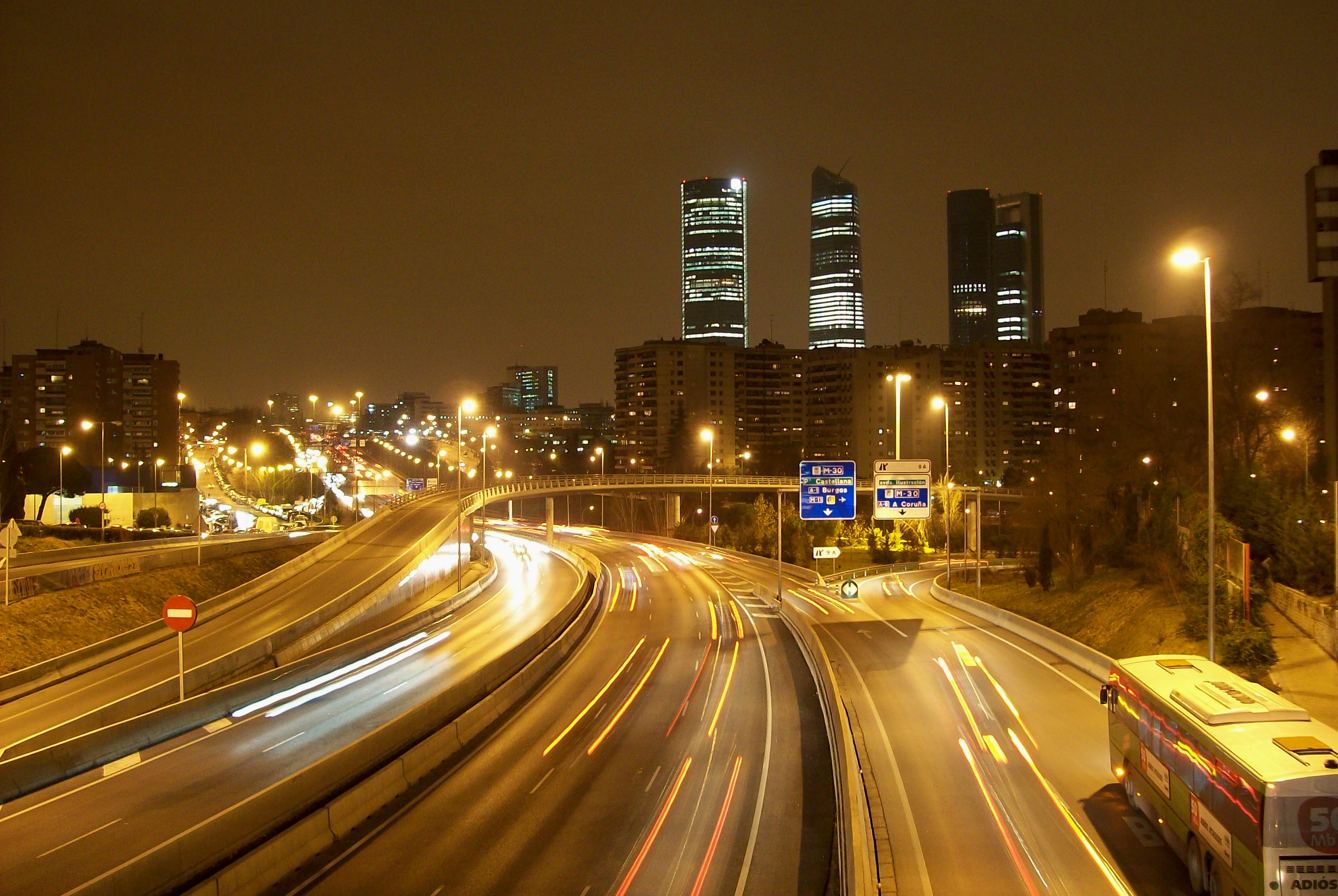
The M-607 meets the M-30 north of the municipality.

Madrid is served by several roads and three modes of public surface transport, and two airports, one of them being almost two different airports. A great many important road, rail and air links converge on the capital, providing effective connections with other parts of the metropolitan region and with the rest of Spain and other parts of Europe.

In the 1960s, sweeping urban reforms were promoted to accommodate Madrid to the private car (most notably the removal of boulevards and the incorporation of overpasses), in some ways similarly to other European cities, but in the distinct context of poverty of public debate, which was limited by a dictatorship putting its own interests and those of its clientelist networks before other concerns when it came to alter the urban fabric, thereby marginizalising the pedestrian.

=== Road transport ===
Madrid Central

Cars (except for hybrid and electric vehicles as well as residents and guests) were banned in the Madrid Central low-emission zone in 2018. Pollution in the area dropped following the ban. In 2016 it was announced that Madrid will stop the use of all diesel powered cars and trucks within the next decade.

Radial roads

The network of high capacity roads in Spain features its most important node in Madrid.

Madrid is the centre of the most important roads of Spain. Already in 1720, the Reglamento General de Postas enacted by Philip V configurated the basis of a radial system of roads in the country.

Madrid features a number of the most prominent autovías (fast dualled highways), part of the State Road Network. Clock-wise starting from the north: the A-1 (Madrid–Irún–French border), A-2 (Madrid–Zaragoza–Barcelona–French border), A-3 (Madrid–Valencia), A-4 (Madrid–Córdoba–Sevilla–Cádiz), A-5 (Madrid–Badajoz–Portuguese border) and the A-6 (Madrid–A Coruña). The A-42, another highway connecting Madrid to Toledo, is also part of the State Network.

The M-607 connects Madrid to the Puerto de Navacerrada. It is a fast dualled highway in its initial stretch from Madrid to Colmenar Viejo, and part of the Regional Road Network (in relation to the concerning administration, not to the technical features of the road).

Due to the large amount of traffic, new toll highways were built parallel to the main national freeways. Their names are R-2, R-3, R-4 and R-5 and they were intended to provide a paid alternative to the often overcrowded free radials. However, except the R-3, they do not end close to the M-30 innermost ring road, as the R-2 finishes in the M-40, the R-4 in the M-50 and the R-5 in the M-40.

Orbital roads

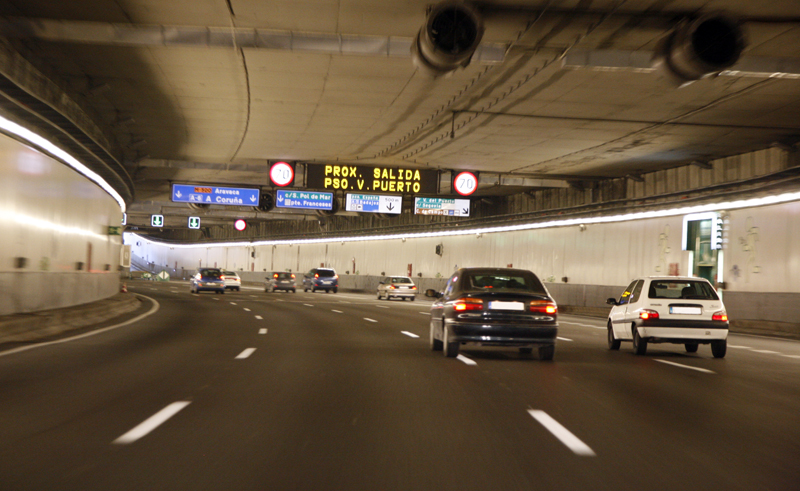
M-30 tunnel parallel to the Manzanares

Also Madrid road network includes four orbital ones at different distances from the centre. The innermost ring-road, the M-30, is the only one with its path strictly located within the Madrid municipal limits. It is owned by the Madrid City Council and operated by Madrid Calle 30, S.A. It is the busiest Spanish road, famous for its traffic jams. A significant portion of the southern part runs underground parallel to the Manzanares, with tunnel sections of more than 6 km (3.7 mi) in length and 3 to 6 lanes in each direction.

The second ring-road, the M-40 (part of the State Road Network) circles the city, while also extending to other surrounding municipalities. A NW stretch of the road runs underground, below the southern reaches of the Monte de El Pardo protected area.

The M-45 partially circles the city, connecting the M-40 and M-50, passing through areas like Villaverde and Vallecas in the southeast of the municipality.

The M-50, the Madrid's outer ring road, connects municipalities and cities in the metropolitan area, like Fuenlabrada, Móstoles, Getafe, Leganés in the south and Boadilla del Monte and Las Rozas in the west.

=== Public transport ===
Map of the Madrid Metro

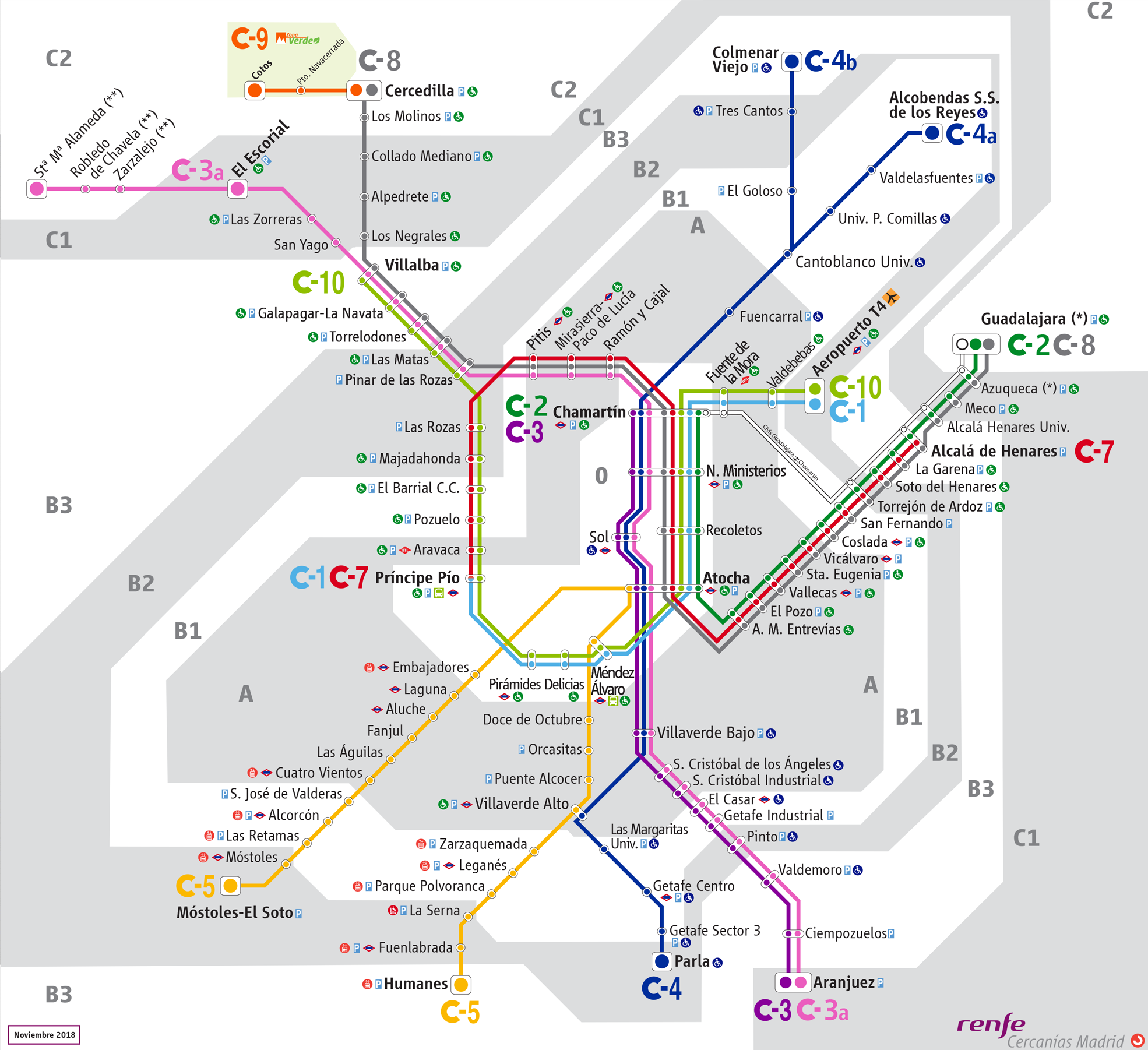
Cercanías Madrid map

There are four major components of public transport, with many intermodal interchanges. The Consorcio Regional de Transportes de Madrid (CRTM) coordinates the public transport operations across multiple providers in the region, harmonising fares for the commuter rail, rapid transit, light rail and bus transport services provided by different operators.

Metro

The Metro is the rapid transit system serving Madrid as well as some suburbs. Founded in 1919, it underwent extensive enlargement in the second half of the 20th century. It is the third longest metro system in Europe (after Moscow and London) at 294 km (183 mi). As of 2019, it has 302 stations. Only the Paris Metro has more stations. It features 13 lines; 12 of them are colour-coded and numbered 1 to 12 (Line 1, Line 2, Line 3, Line 4, Line 5, Line 6, Line 7, Line 8, Line 9, Line 10, Line 11 and Line 12), while the other one, the short Ramal (R), links Ópera to Príncipe Pío.

Cercanías

Cercanías Madrid is the commuter rail service used for longer distances from the suburbs and beyond into Madrid, consisting of nine lines totalling 578 km (359 mi) and more than 90 stations. With fewer stops inside the centre of the city they are faster than the Metro, but run less frequently. This system is connected with Metro (presently 22 stations) and Light Metro. The lines are named: C-1, C-2, C-3, C-4, C-5, C-7, C-8, C-9, C-10, respectively.

Buses

There is a dense network of bus routes, run by the municipal company Empresa Municipal de Transportes (or EMT Madrid), which operates 24 hours a day; special services called "N lines" are run during nighttime. The special Airport Express Shuttle line connecting the airport with the city centre features distinctively yellow buses. In addition to the urban lines operated by the EMT, the green buses (interurbanos) connect the city with the suburbs. The later lines, while also regulated by the CRTM, are often run by private operators.

Almost half of all journeys in the metropolitan area are made on public transport, a very high proportion compared with most European cities. Madrid has 15723 taxis around all the city.

Taxi

The taxicabs are regulated by a specific sub-division of taxi service, a body dependent of the Madrid City Council. The authorisation entails a badge for the vehicle and a license for the driver, who has to be older than 18. Since the 1970s, the fleet of taxis has remained stable roughly around 16,000 vehicles, accounting for 15,600 in 2014.

=== Long-distance transport ===
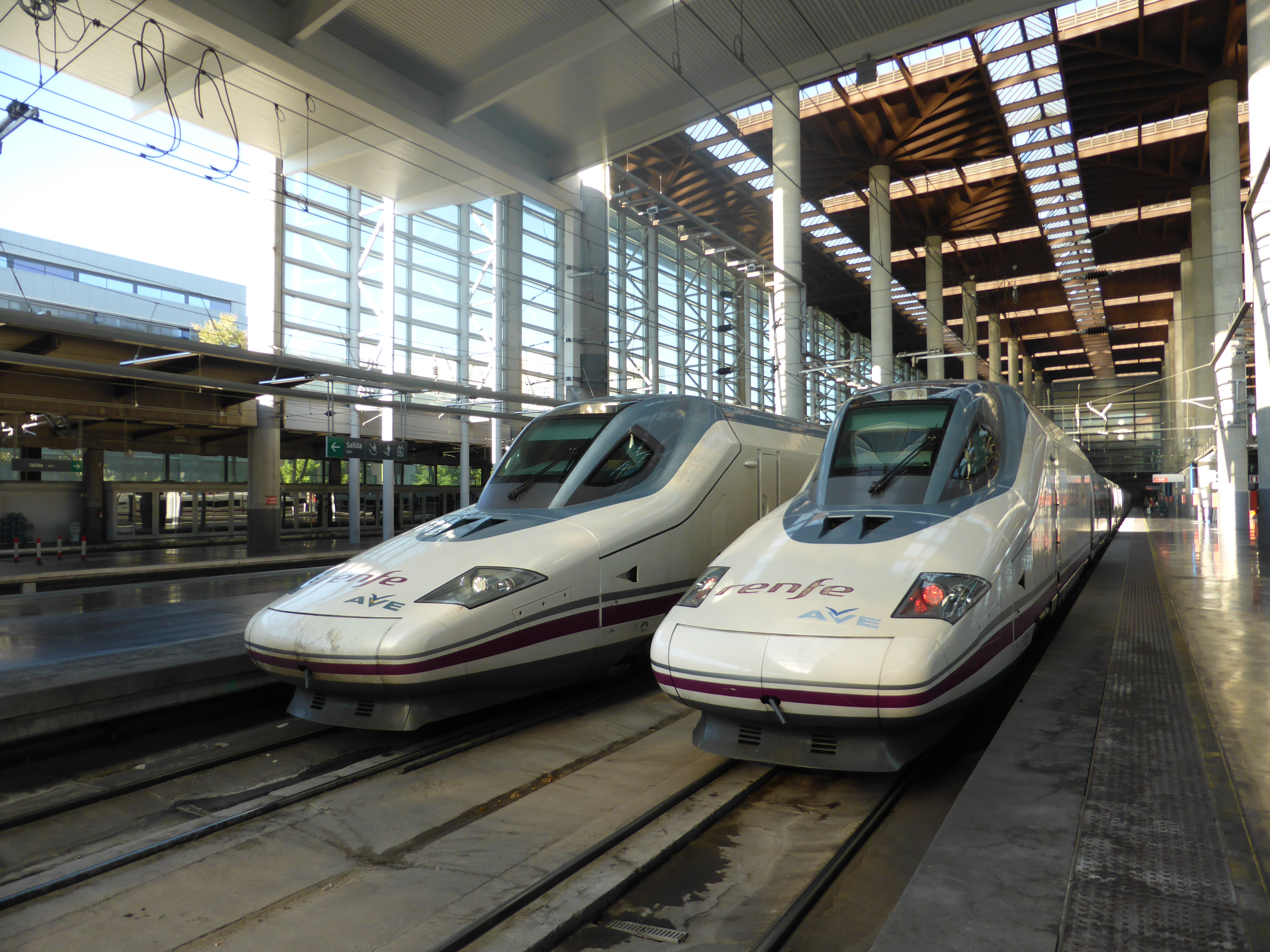
AVE rolling stock at the Madrid Atocha station

In terms of longer-distance transport, Madrid is the central node of the system of autovías, giving the city direct fast road links with most parts of Spain and with France and Portugal. It is also the focal point of Spain's high-speed rail system. The most demanded train routes link Madrid to Barcelona, Valencia, Seville, and Málaga. There are now 2,900 km (1,800 mi) of high-speed rail track, connecting Madrid with 17 provincial capitals, and further lines are under construction.

Spanish companies are designing new high-speed trains which will be the new-generation AVE, much like the current Talgo AVRIL.

Aside from the local and regional bus commuting services, Madrid is also a node for long-distance bus connections to many national destinations. The Estación Sur de Autobuses in Méndez Álvaro, the busiest bus station in the country, also features international bus connections to cities in Morocco as well as to diverse European destinations.

=== Airport ===
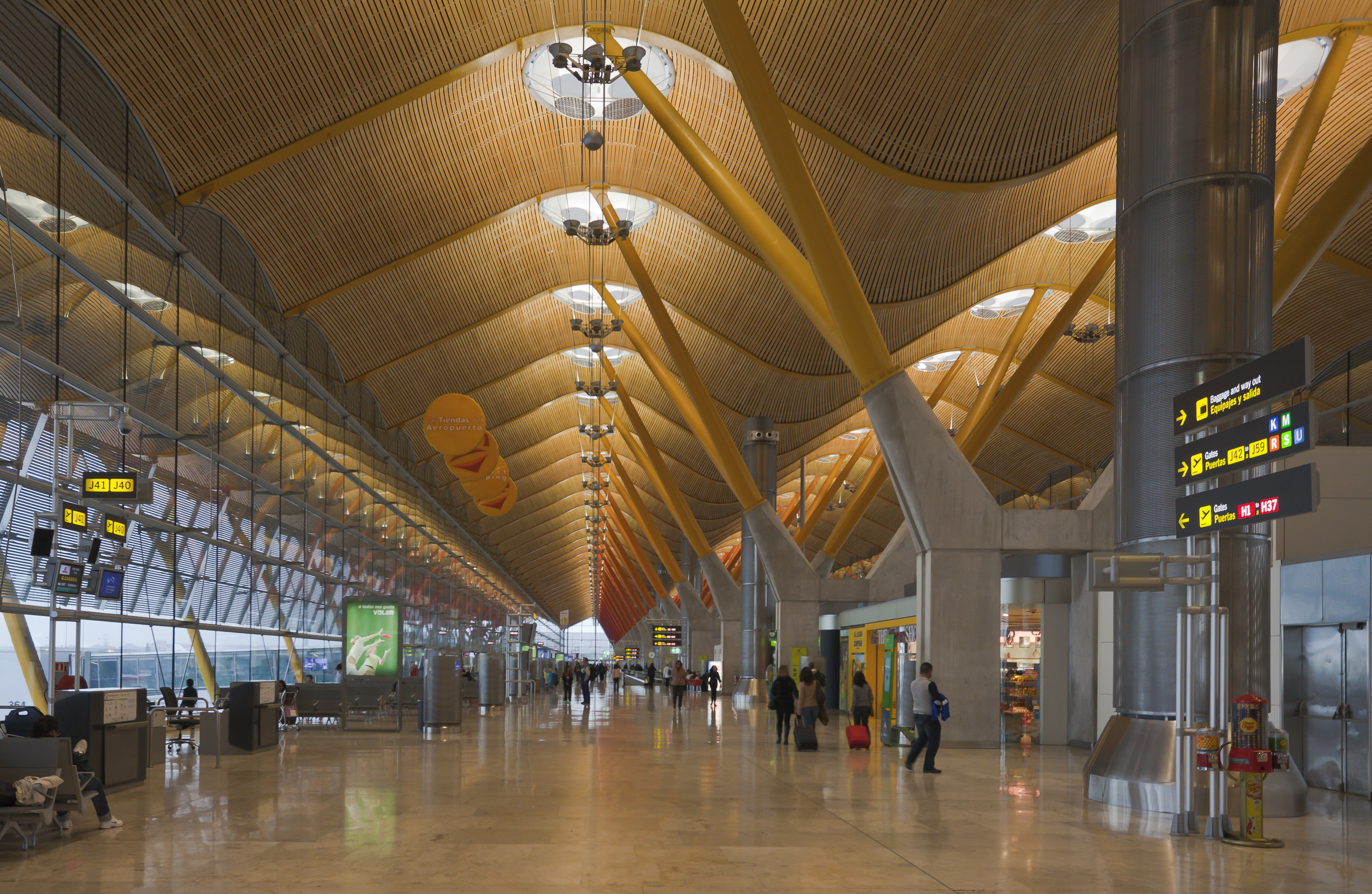
Interior of the terminal 4 (T4) of the Madrid–Barajas Airport

Madrid is also home to the Madrid-Barajas Airport, the sixth-busiest airport in Europe, handling over 60 million passengers annually, of whom 70% are international travellers, in addition to the majority of Spain's air freight movements. Barajas is a major European hub, largely westward facing, specialised in the Americas, with a comparatively lighter connectivity to Asia. Madrid's location at the centre of the Iberian Peninsula makes it a major logistics base. Madrid-Barajas Airport has 4 terminals plus terminal 4S, called the Satellite terminal; this terminal is 2 km (1.2 mi) from terminal 4 and connected by an automated people mover.

The smaller (and older) Cuatro Vientos Airport has a dual military-civilian use and hosts several aviation schools. The Torrejón Air Base, located in the neighbouring municipality of Torrejón de Ardoz, also has a secondary civilian use aside from the military purpose.

== International relations ==
=== Diplomacy ===
Madrid hosts 121 foreign embassies accredited before Spain, comprising the totality of resident embassies in the country. The headquarters of the Spanish Ministry of Foreign Affairs, European Union and Cooperation, the Spanish Agency for International Development Cooperation and the Diplomatic School are also located in the city.

=== International organisations ===
Madrid hosts the seat of international organisations such as the United Nations' World Tourism Organization (UNWTO), the Ibero-American General Secretariat (SEGIB), the Organization of Ibero-American States (OEI), the International Youth Organism for Iberoamerica (OIJ), the Ibero-American Organization of Social Security (OISS), the International Organization of Securities Commissions (IOSCO), the Club of Madrid and the International Commission for the Conservation of Atlantic Tunas (ICCAT).

=== Twin towns and sister cities ===
Madrid has reached twin towns, sister city 'agreements' (acuerdos) with:

- Tokyo, Japan (1965)
- Seoul, South Korea (1978)
- Lisbon, Portugal (1979)
- Panama City, Panama (1980)
- New York, United States (1982)
- Malabo, Equatorial Guinea (1982)
- Bordeaux, France (1984)
- Nouakchott, Mauritania (1986)
- Berlin, Germany (1988)
- Manila, Philippines (2005)
- Sarajevo, Bosnia and Herzegovina (2007)
- Abu Dhabi, United Arab Emirates (2007)
- Miami, United States (2014)

Madrid has reached twin towns, sister city 'minutes' (actas) with:

- Rabat, Morocco (1988)
- Tripoli, Libya (1988)

=== Union of Ibero-American Capital Cities ===
Madrid is part of the Union of Ibero-American Capital Cities establishing brotherly relations with the following cities through the issuing of a collective statement in October 1982:

- Asunción, Paraguay
- Bogotá, Colombia
- Buenos Aires, Argentina
- Caracas, Venezuela
- Guatemala City, Guatemala
- Havana, Cuba
- La Paz, Bolivia
- Lima, Peru
- Lisbon, Portugal
- Managua, Nicaragua
- Mexico City, Mexico
- Montevideo, Uruguay
- Nassau, Bahamas
- Panama City, Panama
- Port of Spain, Trinidad and Tobago
- Quito, Ecuador
- Rio de Janeiro, Brazil
- San Jose, Costa Rica
- San Juan, Puerto Rico
- San Salvador, El Salvador
- Santiago, Chile
- Santo Domingo, Dominican Republic
- Tegucigalpa, Honduras

=== Other city partnerships ===
- Athens, Greece
- Beijing, China
- Belgrade, Serbia
- Brasília, Brazil
- Brussels, Belgium
- Budapest, Hungary
- Cebu City, Philippines
- Chongqing, China
- Davao City, Philippines
- Guadalajara, Mexico
- Kathmandu, Nepal
- Lumbini, Nepal
- Moscow, Russia
- Paris, France
- Prague, Czech Republic
- Rome, Italy
- Sofia, Bulgaria
- Sucre, Bolivia
- Warsaw, Poland
- Zamboanga City, Philippines
- Casablanca, Morocco

=== Partnerships with international organisations ===
- C40 Cities
- International Labour Organization (OIT)
- Ibero-American General Secretariat (SEGIB)
- United Nations Educational, Scientific and Cultural Organization (UNESCO)
- United Nations Human Settlements Programme (ONU-HABITAT)

== Honours ==
- Madrid Dome in Aristotle Mountains, Graham Land, in Antarctica, is named after the city.

== See also ==
- Madrid Conference of 1991
- Mayor of Madrid
- List of tallest buildings in Madrid
- OPENCities
- List of films set in Madrid
