= Paseo de la Castellana =

Thoroughfare in Madrid, Spain

Coordinates: 40°26′38″N 3°41′29″W

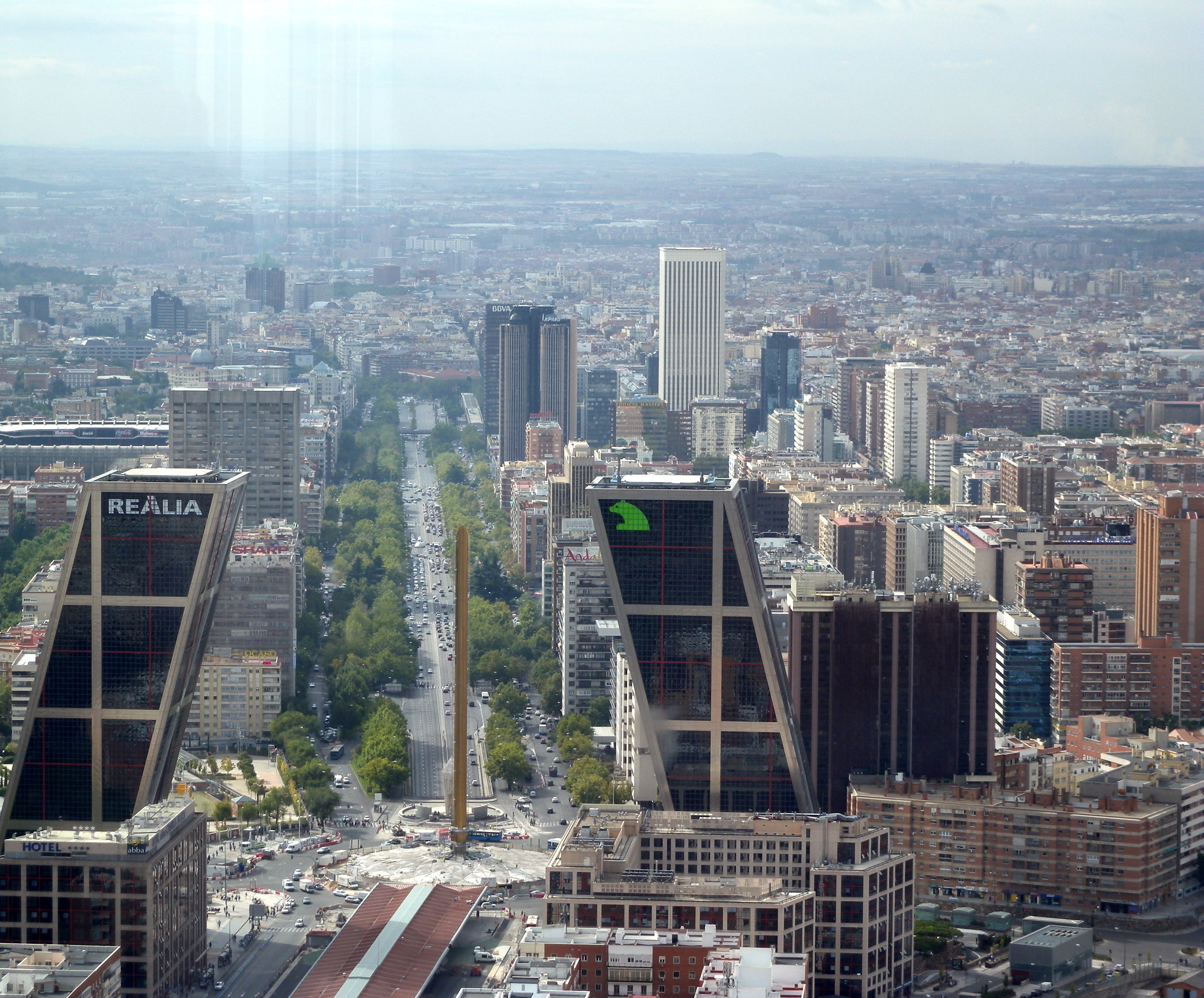
- Interactive map of Paseo de la Castellana
- Type: Street
- Length: 6.3 km (3.9 mi)
- Location: Madrid, Spain
- South end: Plaza de Colón
- North end: M-30

Paseo de la Castellana, (Note: Roughly translated as "The Castilian's Mall", with feminine gender.) commonly known as La Castellana, is a major thoroughfare in Madrid, Spain. Cutting across the city from south to north, it has been described as the "true structuring axis" of the city.

== History and description ==
The street was formerly a thalweg partially along which the Arroyo de la Castellana flowed towards its emptying in the Abroñigal. The Fuente Castellana, which was the main source of the Arroyo de la Castellana and, according to Cervantes, a spring with "extremely cold waters", was located near the current day plaza de Emilio Castelar.

The waterstream, formerly used as dump, was channeled in 1807. The first stretch of the street (from the Gate of Recoletos to the Fuente Castellana) was built following the western (right) bank of the stream; the works started in early 1833, and inaugurated in October 1833, it was named Paseo de las Delicias de la Princesa and Paseo de las Delicias de Isabel II after Princess/Queen Isabella, although it was popularly known as Paseo de la Fuente Castellana. The tree planting ensued for some years.

In the 1930s, during the Second Republic, the Minister Indalecio Prieto and Architect Secundino Zuazo gave the necessary boost for the expansion of the street towards the north, linked to the project of Nuevos Ministerios. Following the Civil War, the Francoist regime resumed the works. During the dictatorship, the stretch north of the crossroads with Raimundo Fernández Villaverde and Joaquín Costa was named "Avenida del Generalísimo". In 1980, following the return of democracy, the Madrid City Council voted to rename streets throughout the capital, reinstating those had prior to the Second Republic; these measures, passed with the votes of the PSOE and PCE municipal councillors, were opposed by the UCD councillors.

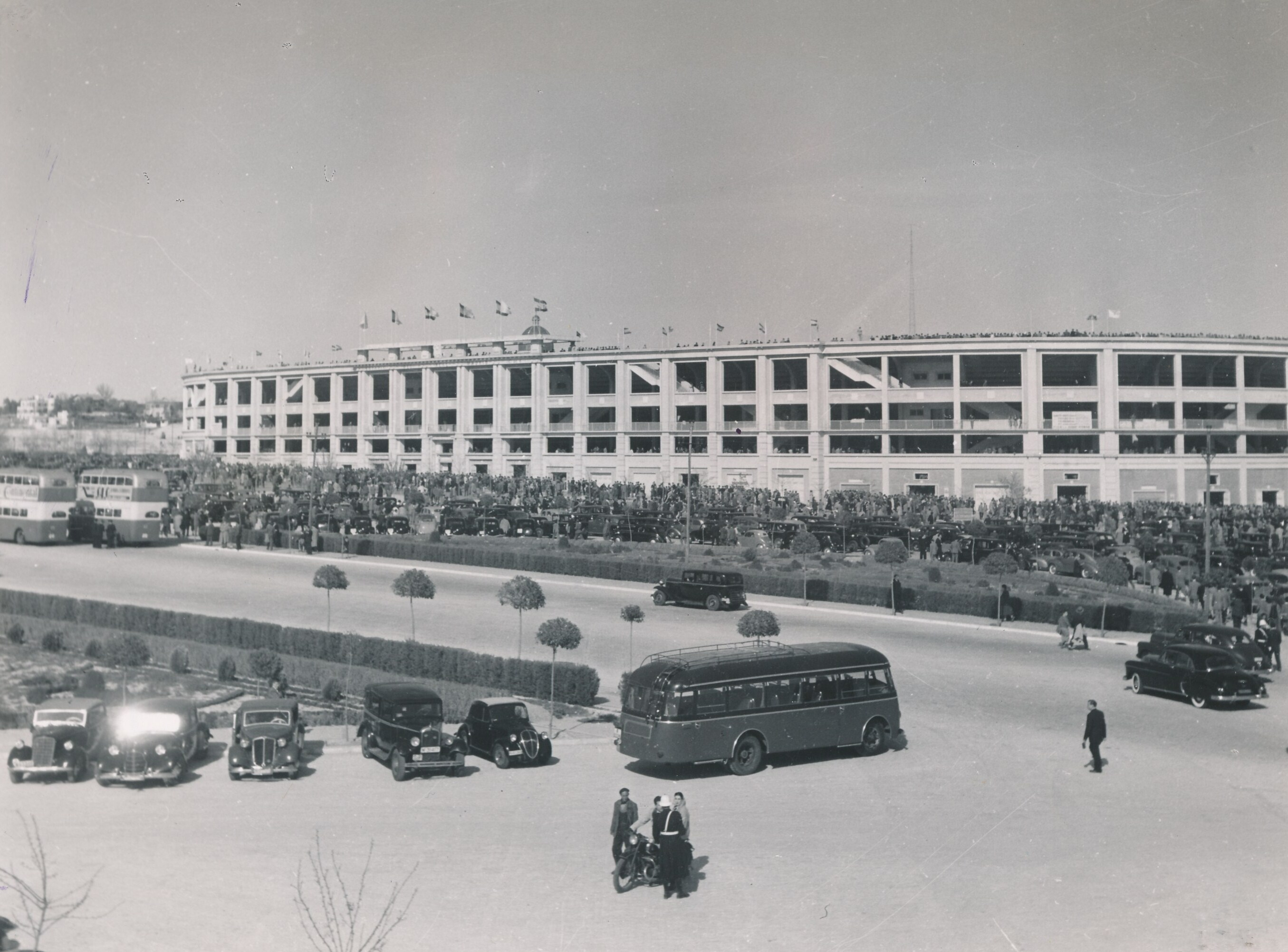
The Santiago Bernabéu Stadium (Estadium the Chamartín) in the early 1950s

La Castellana is prolongation of the Paseo de Recoletos and the Paseo del Prado, and these three avenues are spine of the north–south axis of the city. The street starts at Plaza de Colón, ending at its junction with the M-30 ring road, the so-called Nudo Norte. It passes through the Plaza de Lima, Plaza de Cuzco and the Plaza de Castilla.

The districts of Chamberí (Almagro and Ríos Rosas neighborhoods), Tetuán (Cuatro Caminos, Castillejos and Almenara neighborhoods) and Fuencarral-El Pardo (La Paz neighborhood) lie to the West of La Castellana, while the districts of Salamanca (Recoletos and Castellana neighborhoods) and Chamartín (El Viso, Hispanoamérica, Nueva España and Castilla neighborhoods) lie to the east.

The financial center of Madrid is located along La Castellana or its immediate proximity, comprising locations such as AZCA, Puerta de Europa, and the CTBA. The street also features several embassies and hotels. Other landmarks found along this street include the Palacio de Congresos, the headquarters of the Ministry of Defence, and the Santiago Bernabéu Stadium.

== Gallery ==
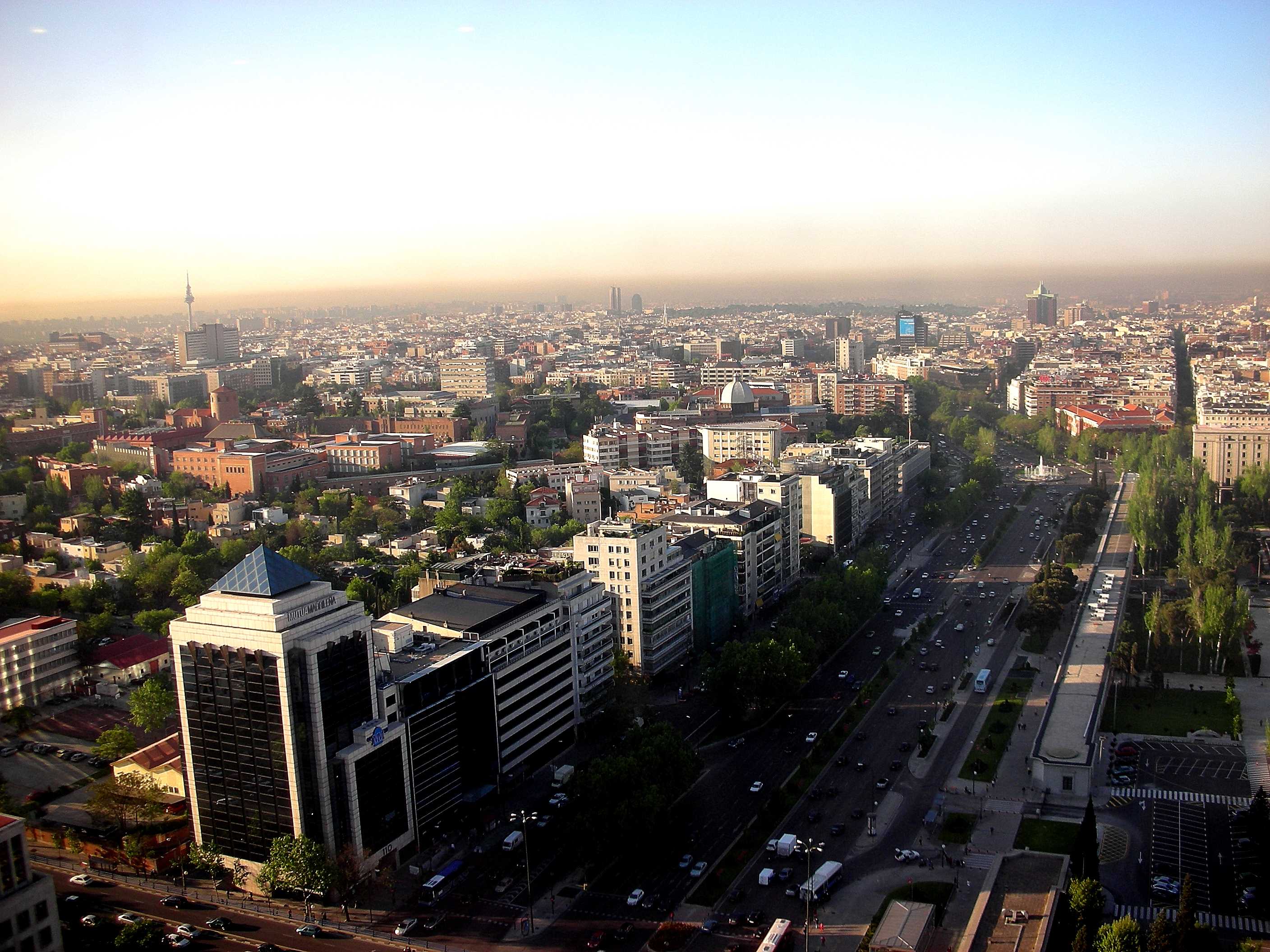
Aerial view (to the south)

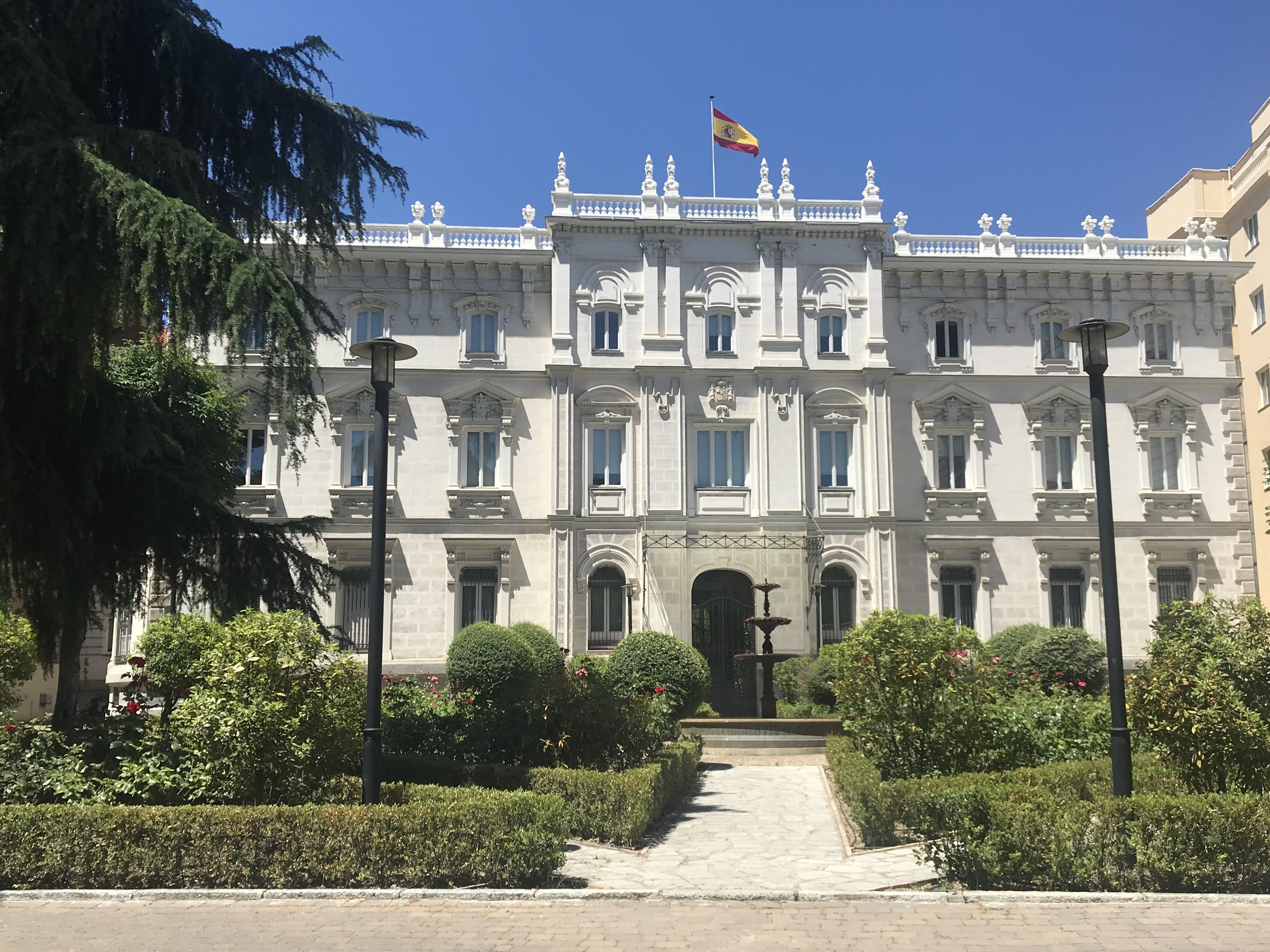
Fontalba Palace

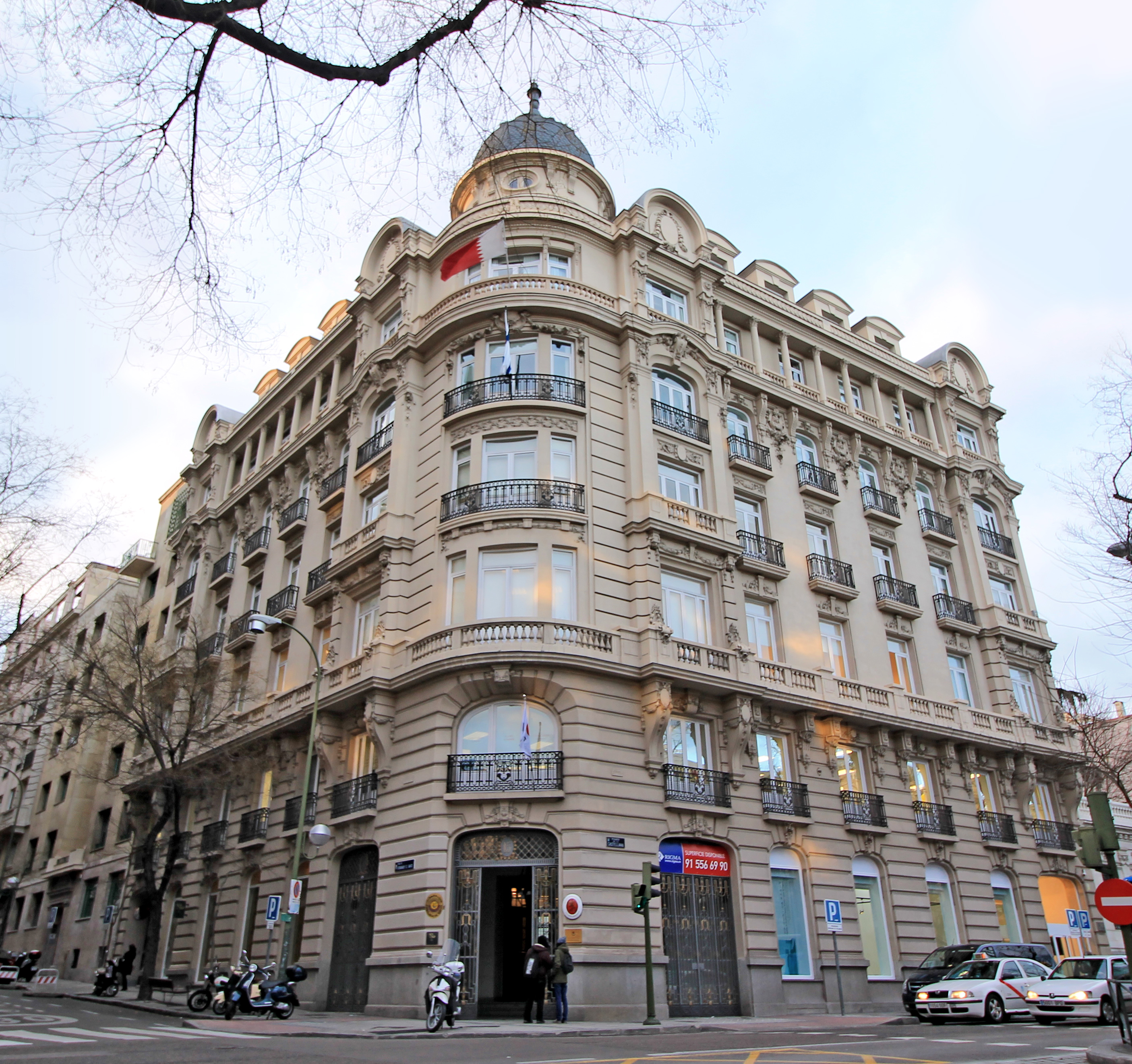
Finnish Embassy

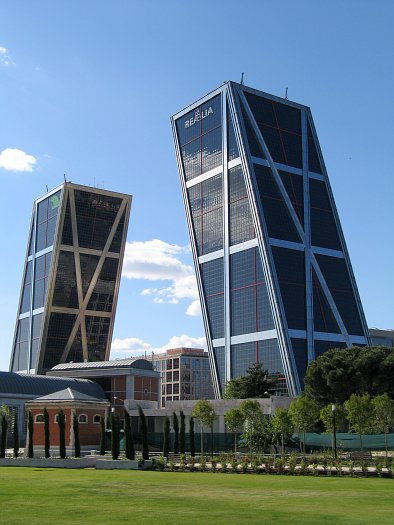
Puerta de Europa

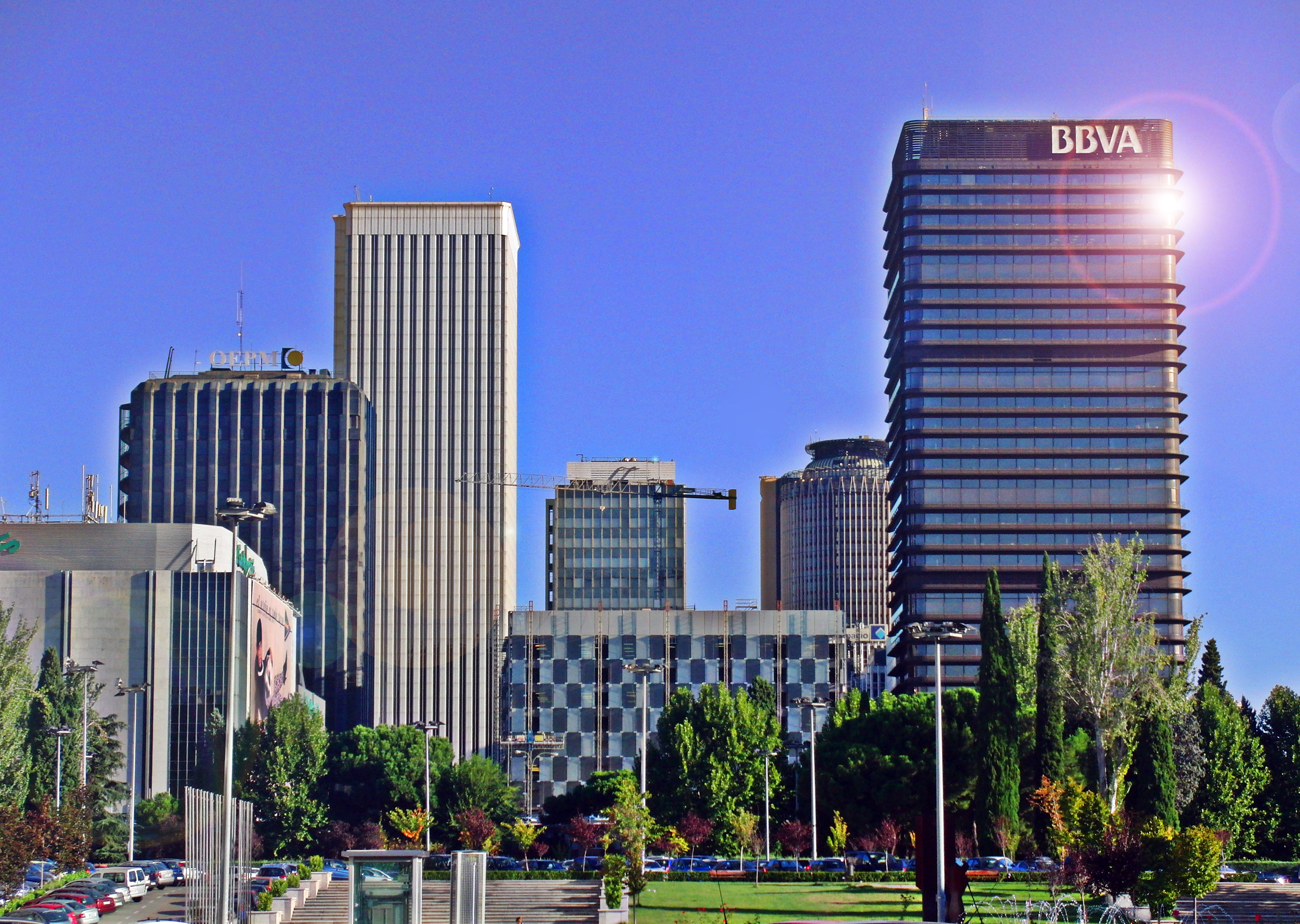
AZCA

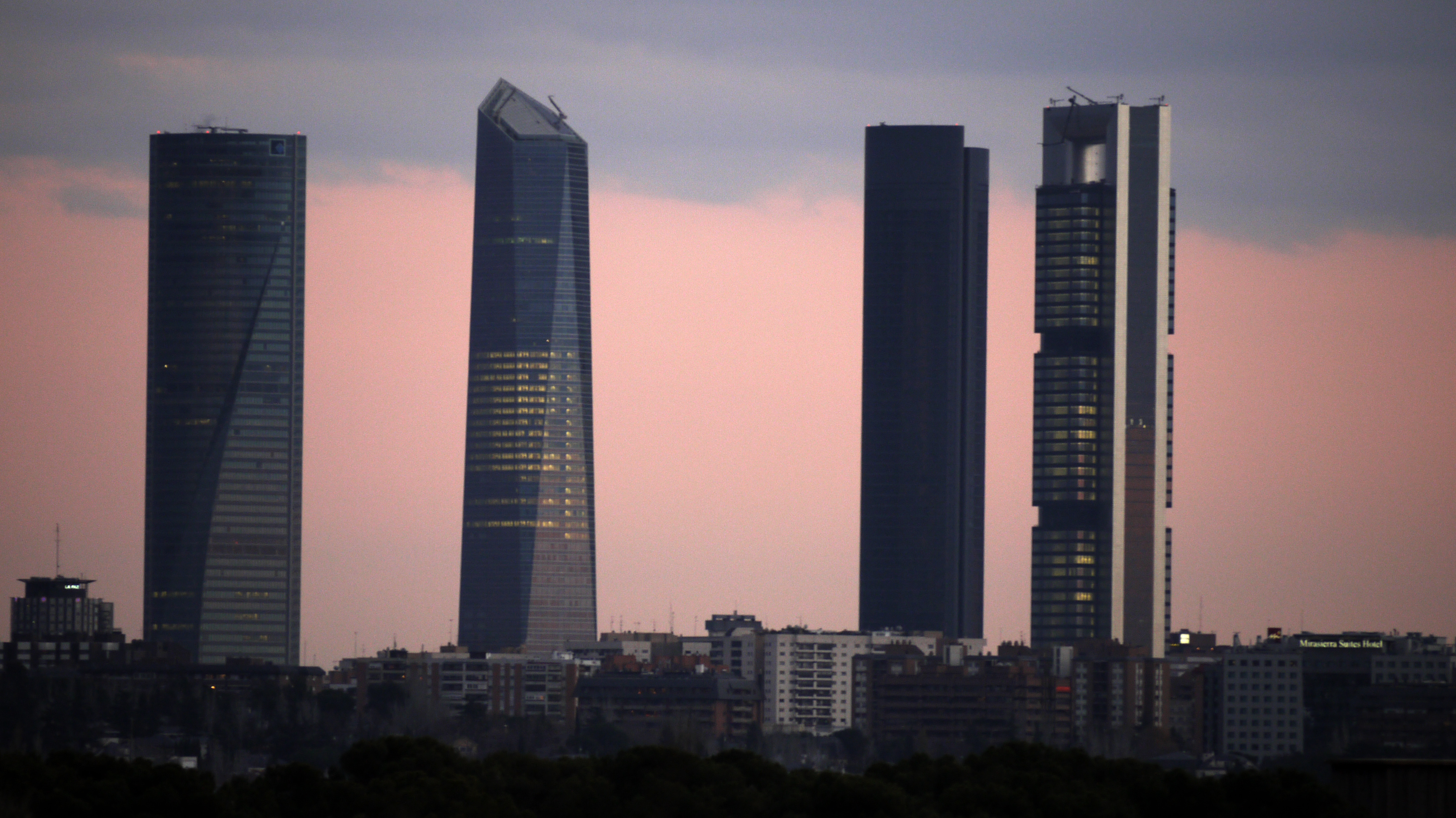
CTBA

== See also ==
- Monument to Isabella the Catholic
- The Hand (Botero), bronze sculpture
