= Laventa =

- Born: Antonia Rodríguez Molina; 1955 (age 70–71); Seville, Andalusia, Spain
- Genres: Flamenco, new flamenco, rumba flamenca
- Occupation: Singer
- Instrument: Vocals
- Years active: 1979-1981
- Label: CBS España

Antonia Rodríguez Molina (born 1955), known professionally as Laventa, is a Spanish singer and dancer of flamenco music. She is noted as a pioneer of the new flamenco movement of the late 1970s and early 1980s.

She was born in Seville in La Venta de la Ranilla, the place from which she acquired her nickname and stage name "Laventa". She began her career dancing in the tablaos of Seville. In 1968, she danced at the La Cochera tablao and the following year she moved to the best tablao in the city.

In 1972, she debuted as a singer at the Los Canasteros tablao, a place where her voice was heard by many artists, including Lola Flores, who invited her to work at her tablao and be the closing act of her show.

In 1975, she was chosen Miss Madrid in a beauty pageant where Lola Flores was a member of the jury and awarded her the beauty queen sash. Blanco y negro magazine wrote: "Antonia Rodríguez Molina, from Seville, twenty years old, brunette and also beautiful. She's something like a woman [from the paintings] of Julio Romero".

She signed a recording contract with Spanish CBS record label and recorded three studio albums, Al compás del viento (1978), Valles y barrancos (1979), and El amor que se va (1981). Of her first album, José Climent of Record World wrote: "The LP from Laventa (CBS), the new star of Spanish song, is wonderful and worth listening to".

Her singles with CBS include "Quiero volver" (1977), "Cuando me miras" (1978), "Me duele el corazón" (1979), and "Y amanecer" (1981). She also appeared in the Spanish film Vivir en Sevilla (1978), where she sang "Luna en el horizonte".

== Discography ==
- Al compás del viento (1978)
- Valles y barrancos (1979)
- El amor que se va (1981)

== Filmography ==
- Vivir en Sevilla (1978)
- Corridas de alegría (1982)
