= Chamartín (Madrid) =

Coordinates: 40.7017°N 4.95722°W

- District of Madrid
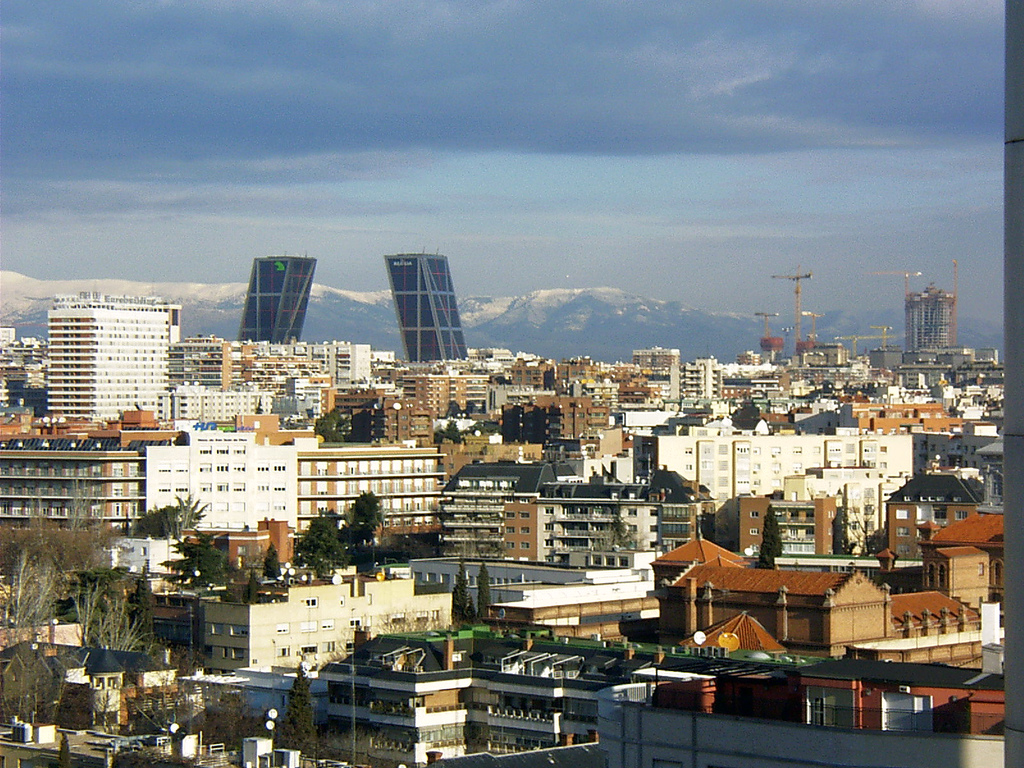
- Gate of Europe towers and the Cuatro Torres Business Area under construction
- Interactive map of Chamartín
- Country: Spain
- Aut. community: Madrid
- Municipality: Madrid

Government
  - Councillor-President: Yolanda Estrada Marín (PP, 2023)

Area
  - Total: 5.5 km^{2} (2.1 sq mi)

Population
  - Total: 140,000
  - Density: 25,000/km^{2} (66,000/sq mi)
- Postal code: 28032
- Madrid district number: 5

Chamartín (Spanish pronunciation: [tʃamaɾˈtin]) is an administrative district of Madrid, Spain and consists of the following neighbourhoods: El Viso, La Prosperidad, Ciudad Jardín, Hispanoamérica, Nueva España, and Castilla. It was originally a separate city named Chamartín de la Rosa and remained an independent municipality until it was incorporated to Madrid in 1948.

== Overview ==
It is bounded by the Paseo de la Castellana to the west, the Autopista de Circunvalación M-30 to the north and east, and the Autovía A-2 to the south.

Some of the landmarks of Chamartín are the Gate of Europe, a pair of inclined office buildings; the Santiago Bernabéu Stadium, home of the football team Real Madrid; Chamartín Station, the second-largest railway station in Madrid; the Cuatro Torres Business Area, a business park that comprises the four tallest skyscrapers in Spain; and the National Auditorium of Music (the main concert hall in Madrid) which hosts the Spanish National Orchestra.

== Geography ==
=== Subdivision ===
The district is administratively divided into 6 wards (Barrios):

- Castilla
- Ciudad Jardín
- El Viso
- Hispanoamérica
- Nueva España
- Prosperidad

== Economy ==
The district has the head office of Iberia Airlines and the head office of Iberia Express.
