= Ignacio Aldecoa =

Spanish writer (1925–1969)

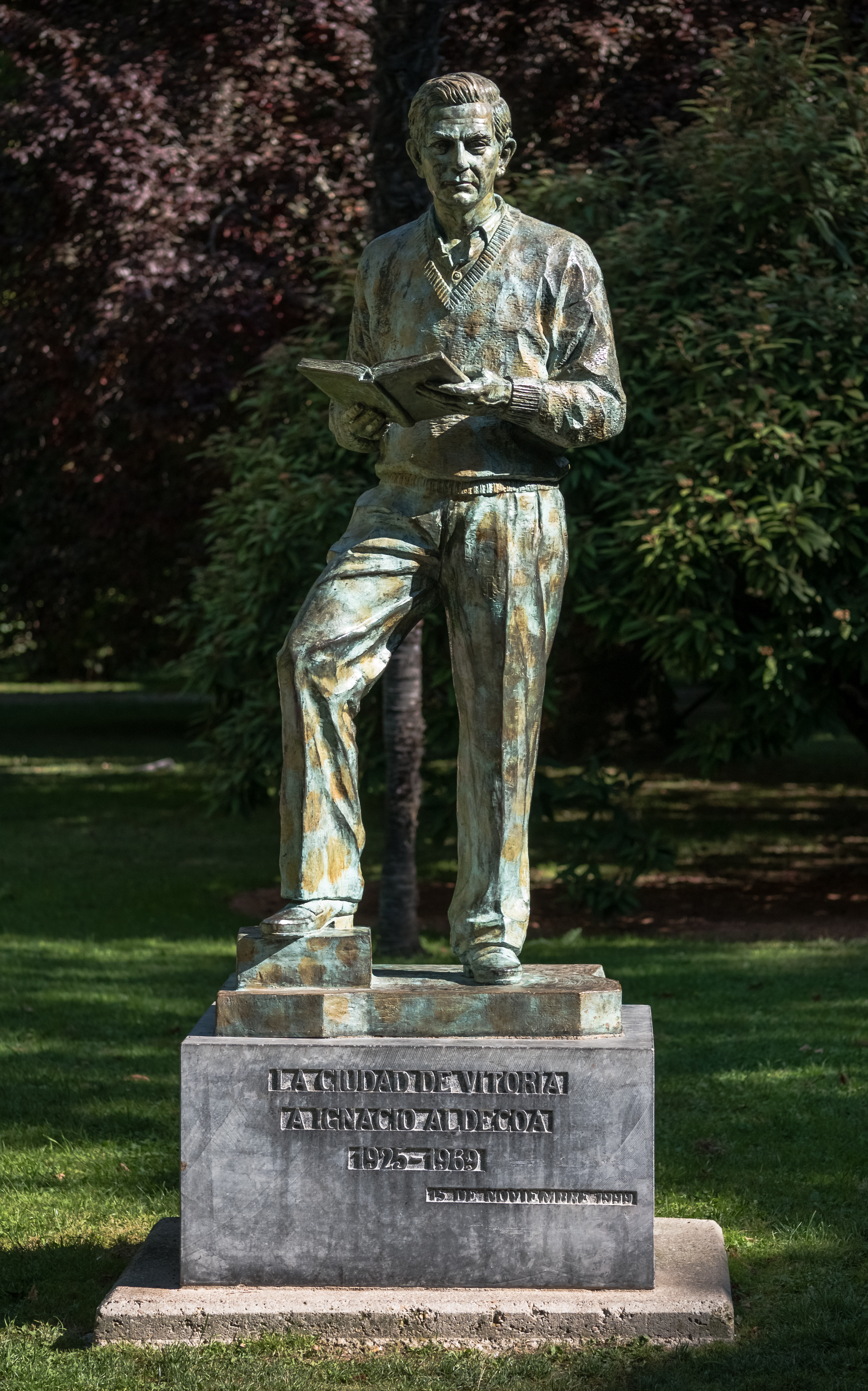
Statue of Ignacio Aldecoa in Vitoria.

José Ignacio Aldecoa e Isasi (24 July 1925 – 15 November 1969) was a Spanish writer. He was the nephew of the painter Adrián Aldecoa.

== Biography ==
José Ignacio de Aldecoa e Isasi was born in Vitoria-Gasteiz on 24 July 1925, the first child of Simón de Aldecoa y Arbulo and María Carmen Isasi y Pedruzo. He had a sister called María Teresa, born in 1927. Ignacio's father was a middle-class artisan who ran a family business in industrial decoration and restoration inherited from his father, Laureano de Aldecoa. The young Aldecoa was affectionately known as Iñaki in the home and enjoyed a happy and lively childhood marred only by his experience of school.

Aldecoa studied in the Arts Faculty at the University of Madrid. He lived later in the United States of America. His first published works were collections of poetry, published in 1947 and 1949. El fulgor y la sangre was his first novel, published in 1954. It failed to win the important Premio Planeta by just one vote. El fulgor forms part of a projected trilogy: the first part, El fulgor deals with the Civil Guard; the second (Con el viento solano, 1956), deals with to some extent with gypsies, traditional enemies, not to say victims, of the Guards; the third part, Los pozos, never appeared but apparently dealt with bullfighters. The link between the three is that in the first part a guard is murdered by a gypsy; the flight to Madrid and eventual surrender of the killer (Sebastián Vázquez) are related in part two; Vázquez is a friend of the bullfighters and something of an aficionado of the sport - this may have been what leads to the final part.

Aldecoa was a fairly prolific writer, he produced about half a dozen novels and as many books of short stories as well as some travel books. He belongs to that second generation of post war novelists who (unlike Camilo José Cela, Carmen Laforet, Miguel Delibes, e.g.) were still very young when the war ended and had no direct personal involvement in it. Within the obvious limits dictated by prudence, Aldecoa seeks to approach the issue of the Civil War impartially in El fulgor, which contains many flashbacks and reminiscences of the 1930s, though set in 1948.

His narrative work reflected the neorealism current in Spain in the 1950s, and his stories have the flavour of an experience felt and lived. He was also a journalist and broadcaster, and wrote four movie scripts.

In 1952 Ignacio Aldecoa married Spanish writer and teacher Josefina Rodríguez Álvarez (who changed her name to Josefina Aldecoa after her husband died). They had a daughter, Susana Aldecoa, who is today the Principal of Colegio Estilo. Ignacio Aldecoa died in Madrid in 1969, at age 44.

== Works published ==
- El fulgor y la sangre (1954)
- Con el viento solano (1956)
- Los pozos
- Gran Sol, Critics' Award (1958)
- Parte de una historia (1967)
