= Prosperidad (Madrid) =

Coordinates: 40°26′42″N 3°40′12″W

- City neighborhood
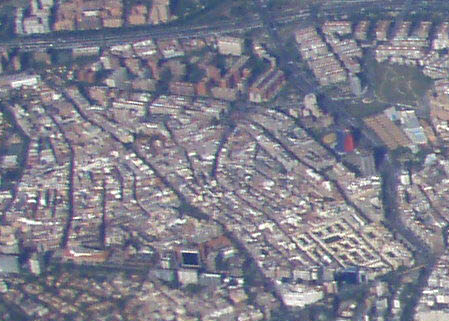

- Country: Spain
- Region: Community of Madrid
- Municipality: Madrid
- District: Chamartín

Area
  - Total: 1.043284 km^{2} (0.402814 sq mi)

Population (2020)
  - Total: 37,018
  - Density: 35,482/km^{2} (91,898/sq mi)

Prosperidad is an administrative neighborhood of Madrid belonging to the district of Chamartín. Its boundaries are: to the west the street Príncipe de Vergara, south: the Calle de María de Molina and Avenida de América, east: the M-30 and north: the street Lopez de Hoyos (one of the longest streets city noted for its great commercial activity.) Padre Claret street and avenue Ramon y Cajal.^{1}

It has an area of 1.043284 km^{2} (0.402814 sq mi). As of 1 March 2020, it has a population of 37,018.

== History ==
In 1862, the year of its origin, the neighborhood of Prosperity was composed of a set of land irrigated unproductive, crossed by numerous trails and dotted with tile factories, farmhouses, and some ventorros.^{2} Since emerging in the periphery of Madrid, the neighborhood has grown in size and population steadily. In 1898, it joined the district of Buenavista, and since 1955 it is part of the district of Chamartín.

=== Origin ===
In the second half of the nineteenth century, Madrid was a city too large to enter the restricted perimeter, consisting of the old wall that Philip IV Mandara built in 1625. For this reason, 19 July 1860 approving the Draft widening of Madrid to increase the urban area of the capital, toppling the old fence. The new perimeter was delimited by a trench or pit that would lead to the "Rounds". Today, it practically coincides with Queen Victoria's Avenue and the streets Raimundo Fernández Villaverde, Joaquín Costa, Francisco Silvela, and Doctor Esquerdo.

Across the Eixample and "Rounds" was a distant periphery of the city composed of the nearby villages and small towns that would be the seeds of future neighborhoods. These suburbs, grown spontaneously, without any planning irregular manner^{three} were populated by the incessant immigration into the Peninsula who came to Madrid in search of work and a better future.

It can be stated that prosperity was born on 14 December 1862,^{3} day were recorded in a notary's office in Madrid the first two plots arranged for housing construction in the name of Pedro Prado and Gregorio Mayorga, bricklayer and carpenter respectively. The seller, Prospero Soynard, was an "owner" by profession,^{4} landlord and investor, who had acquired five acres of agricultural land (about 1.75 ha) south of the road of Hortaleza and was dividing their property into small plots to sell. Since 1862, successive subdivision and sale of the surrounding land by the owners gave the fledgling village of a large number of houses.

=== Development ===
The first houses built in the suburb were attending rural typologies that reproduced the style and lifestyle of its inhabitants. They were casualties of small size houses, brick, and tile, with patio. Prosperity in 1882 gathered 166 buildings, more than half terreras houses, some houses broker or neighborhood playgrounds in poor health conditions. In 1872 there were 300 inhabitants; in 1900, over 2000; and in 1930, 13,800.^{4}

The administrative division of Madrid affected the area in the four changes made by the City Council.^{4} From 1898 to 1955 Prosperity was part of the district of Buenavista, in that year to join the Chamartín district boundaries and reducing their size. In 1970, a municipal decree reduced ward boundaries again. Finally, in 1987, a new decree creates the Garden City district, and Prosperity is divided into two and renamed the area north of the street Lopez de Hoyos "Garden City", keeping the name for the area south of axis.^{4}

From 1915 and more widely throughout the 1920s, once the process of urbanization and infrastructure improvement had reached an acceptable level, the housing stock increased markedly hand individual initiatives, providing new types that abounded in most soil densification and profitability promotions. Examples of colonies garden, benefiting from cheap housing laws, such as Colonia Primo de Rivera (1925–1930), Colonia Prosperidad (1926–1935), or Colonia Cruz del Rayo (1927–1930), inspired are also given in Garden City English and in the writings of Ebenezer Howard, with architectural typologies in which houses grouped in two blocks predominate, the townhouses in rows and isolated. Its architecture is based, generally, on regionalist and historicist conceptions. These initiatives should be added polygons public, private development first and then the postwar period, which endowed the neighborhood of social housing as in the case of the Colony "Virgen del Pilar" (1947).^{4}

From the 1940s until the late-1980s, with very high immigration and ongoing capital, Prosperity saw an increase in its population and residential park. Today much of the latter is made up of promotions that period. However, during the decades of the 1960s and 1970s, the renovation of the farmhouse is produced with the continued demolition of the oldest, before the buildings civil war, which were still standing and their replacement by modern dwellings standardized winning height and intensifying land use in a physical renovation process that has produced the devastation of the historical and architectural heritage of the neighborhood.^{5}

== Demographics ==
Number of people of different years from 1862 to 1983. From 1987, Prosperity's population data were undermined by the administrative division decreed by the City Council to split the district into two-halves. Prosperity and Garden City^{4}
