= Colegio Estilo =

Art school in Madrid, Spain

Colegio Estilo was a private secular school in Madrid, Spain. It was founded in 1959 by Spanish writer Josefina Aldecoa, who was the Principal of Colegio Estilo for 52 years. The last Principal of Colegio Estilo was Susana Aldecoa. Colegio Estilo closed in 2019, with around 200 students and 30 teachers. It was a secular and artistic school, located in the area of El Viso, in Madrid, Spain.

== History ==
Colegio Estilo was founded by Josefina Aldecoa in October 1959 in Madrid, Spain. Colegio Estilo was born of the need for a free, modern, and pro-European school.

Located at calle Serrano 182, in El Viso neighborhood, the impending closure of the school was announced in June 2019.

Willy Toledo and Marcos de Quinto studied at the Colegio Estilo.

== Philosophy ==
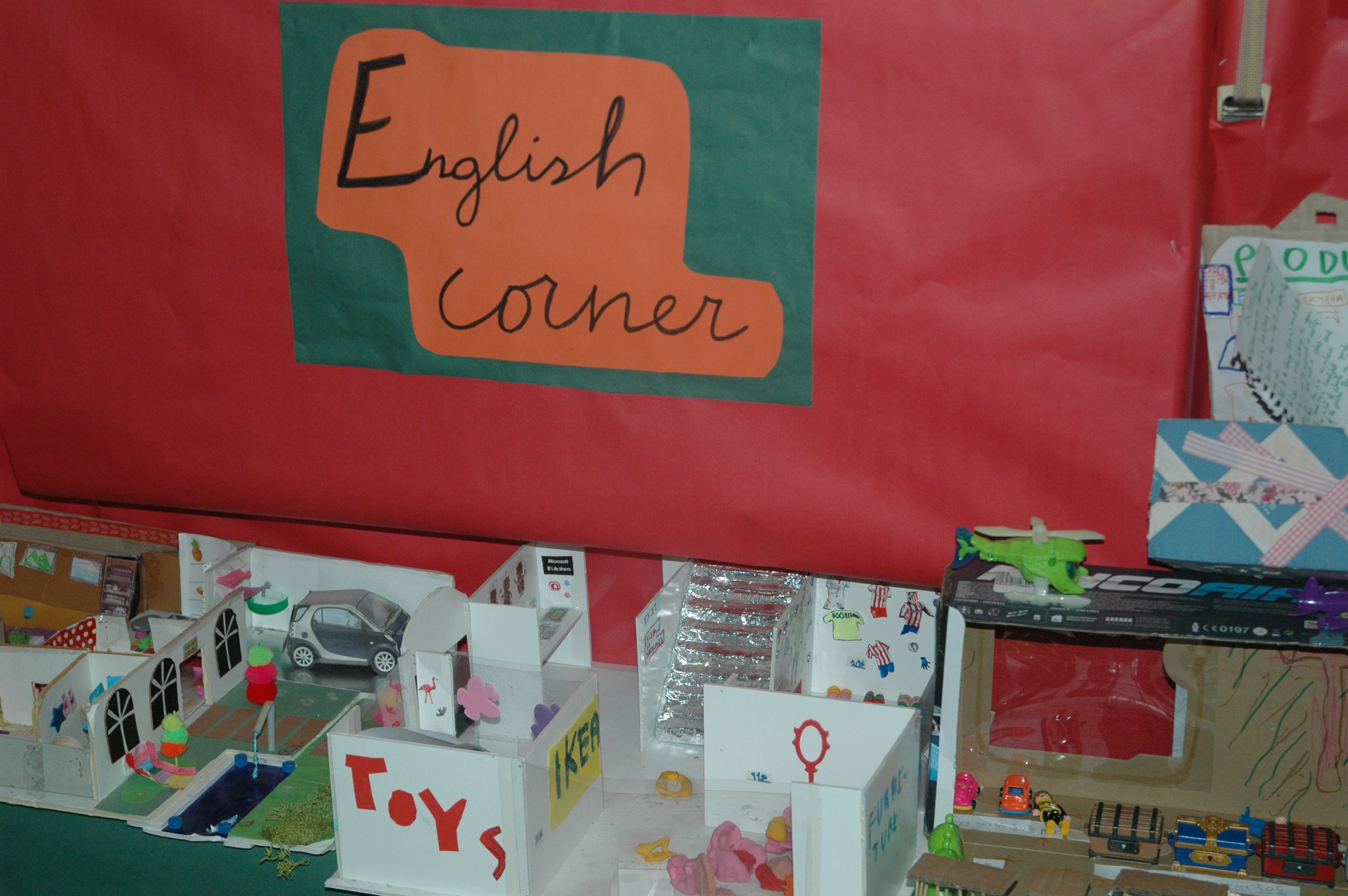
English corner / Artworks by the students of Colegio Estilo / Prom Exhibition, Madrid, June 2016

Colegio Estilo followed the model laid out by the ILE (Private Institution of Teaching). Art was a core subject from the age of three and there was individual monitoring and follow-up of each student. Much of the classwork were carried out without text books and it was the children themselves who decoratef their workbooks.

== Subjects ==
At Colegio Estilo, Language, Mathematics, Natural Sciences, History and Geography were taught in a creative way. It is the children themselves who crafted their own books and notebooks. The students painted on easels, worked with clay, fabrics, watercolors and all kinds of materials. Classical music often accompanied them as they work and create.

In general, students had five classes a week of English, three of Physical Education, two of Art, and one each of Music, Chess, Theatre, Creative Maths and Art History. In 5th and 6th grades children were introduced to French as a third language, as well as History of Religions.

== Principals ==
- Josefina Aldecoa (Principal of Colegio Estilo from 1959 until her death in 2011)
- Susana Aldecoa (Principal of Colegio Estilo since 2011 until the school shutdown in 2019). Before being the Principal, Susana Aldecoa was the Assistant Principal of Colegio Estilo for more than 30 years.

== Fees ==
- Pre-school: €489 / month
- 1st and 2nd grades Primary school: €510 / month
- 3rd grade: €516 / month
- 4th grade: €530 / month
- 5th and 6th grades: €572 / month
- Lunch and snacks provided by school: €180 / month
- Material: €300 / year

== Bibliography ==
Amelia Castilla. Memoria de un colegio : "Estilo", una experiencia de educación en libertad sobre la base de la comunidad. Madrid : Biblioteca Nueva, 2002.

María Jesús Álava Reyes & Susana Aldecoa. La Buena Educación. Enseñar con libertad y compromiso para convertir a los niños en adultos felices. Madrid: La esfera de los libros, 2003. ISBN 978-84-9970-570-5
