= Josefina Aldecoa =

Spanish writer and teacher (1926–2011)

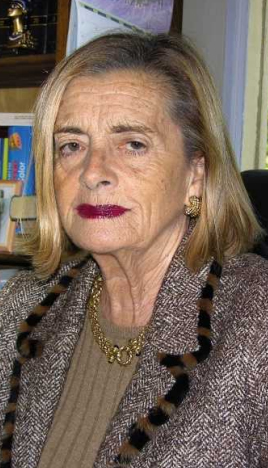
Josefina Aldecoa in 2005. Writer and founder of Colegio Estilo in Madrid, Spain. (March 8, 1926 – March 16, 2011)

Josefina Aldecoa, originally known as Josefa Rodríguez Álvarez (8 March 1926 – 16 March 2011), was a Spanish writer and teacher born in León. She was married to the writer Ignacio Aldecoa, whose surname she adopted for her own literary career after his death. Josefina Aldecoa was the founder and Principal of the Colegio Estilo from 1959 until her death in 2011. She died on 16 March 2011 in Cantabria, due to respiratory problems, at the age of 85.

== Biography ==
Josefina Aldecoa grew up in León, where she became part of a literary group that produced the poetry magazine Espadaña. She moved to Madrid in 1944, where she studied Philosophy and Literature. She received her doctorate in pedagogy from the University of Madrid, focusing on a child's relationship to art. Her dissertation was later published as the book El arte del niño (1960). While studying, she became connected to a group of writers known as the Generation of '50: Carmen Martín Gaite, Rafael Sánchez Ferlosio, Alfonso Sastre, Jesús Fernández Santos, and Ignacio Aldecoa, whom she married in 1952. In 1959, she founded Colegio Estilo in Madrid, Spain.

Coming from a family of teachers, her mother and grandmother practiced the ideology of the Institución Libre de Enseñanza, an institution founded in the 19th century to reform education in Spain. She lived in León where she formed a part of a literary group that produced the poetry magazine Espadaña. She moved to Madrid in 1944. At the University of Madrid, she studied Philosophy and Literature and earned a PhD in Education on the relationship between infants and art. This thesis was later published under the title El arte del niño (1960). During her years of study, she came in contact with a group of writers that later formed part of the Generation of ‘50: Carmen Martín Gaite, Rafael Sánchez Ferlosio, Alfonso Sastre, Jesús Fernández Santos, and Ignacio Aldecoa, whom she married in 1952 and had one daughter with, Susana. She took Ignacio’s surname, but only after being widowed in 1969, leaving the R. of Rodríguez (Josefina R. Aldecoa). She translated for the newspaper Revista Española, directed by Ignacio Aldecoa, Rafael Sánchez Ferlosio, and Alfonso Sastre.

In Madrid in 1959, she founded the Colegio Estilo, which was her greatest work for her, situated in the region of El Viso. She was inspired by the ideas poured out in her thesis on pedagogy, in the schools that she had visited in England and the United States and in the educational ideas of Krausism, formed the ideological base of the Institución Libre de Enseñanza: "I want something very humanist, giving much importance to literature, writing, art; a school that was very culturally refined, very free and not talk about religion, things that were then unthinkable in most of the centers of the country. "

In 1961, she published the collection of stories titled A ninguna parte. In Los niños de la guerra (1983), she chronicled her generation illustrated by portraits, biographies and literary commentaries on ten narrators which emerged in the 1950s.

In 1969, her husband died and she abandoned her writing devoted to teaching, until 1981 when she published a critical edition of a selection of tales of Ignacio Aldecoa. She continued her literary career with novels like Los niños de la guerra (1983), La enredadera (1984), Porque eramos jovenes (1986) or El vergel (1988). In 1990, she began a trilogy of autobiographical content Historia de una maestra (1990), Mujeres de negro (1994) and La fuerza del destino (1997), partially in response to political discourse during the years after the dictatorship about how to rebuild the educational system, which she did not consider secular enough.

In 1998, she wrote the essay Confesiones de una abuela, in which she addresses the relationships and experiences lived by her grandson. In 2000, she published Fiebre, an anthology of stories written between 1950 and 1990, and in 2002, El enigma, romance novel.

In 2003, she won the Premio Castilla y León de las Letras. In that same year, she published En la distancia, her memoirs. She not only reconstructs her memories, but also those of the last generation of Spanish intellectuals and writers of the Civil War and postwar: Ignacio Aldecoa, Luis Martín-Santos, Juan Benet, Jesus Fernandez Santos, Rafael Sánchez Ferlosio, and Carmen Martín Gaite. It also reminds us of how she became a writer by accident, through an editorial assignment, of which she has no regret. The same as her travels abroad, which allowed herin a closed world flawed by the first Francoism.

In 2005 she published La casa gris, a play she wrote when she was 24 years old where she narrates, in the form of a narrative through the protagonist, Teresa, her life in London reflecting on the differences in Spain and Europe in the 1950s. She published her last publication, Hermanas, in 2008 and died March 16, 2011, in Mazcuerras, Cantabria, from respiratory complications.

== Works ==
- El arte del niño (1960)
- A ninguna parte (1961)
- Los niños de la guerra (1983)
- La enredadera (1984)
- Porque éramos jóvenes (1986)
- El vergel (1988)
- Cuento para Susana (1988)
- Historia de una maestra (1990)
- Mujeres de negro (1994)
- Ignacio Aldecoa en su paraíso (1996)
- Espejismos (1996)
- La fuerza del destino (1997)
- Confesiones de una abuela (1998)
- Pinko y su perro (1998)
- El mejor (1998)
- La rebelión (1999)
- El desafío (2000)
- Fiebre (2001)
- La educación de nuestros hijos (2001)
- El enigma (2002)
- En la distancia (2004)
- La Casa Gris (2005)
- Hermanas (2008)
