= Ciudad Jardín (Madrid) =

Ward of Madrid in Madrid, Spain

Coordinates: 40°26′49″N 3°40′18″W

- City neighborhood
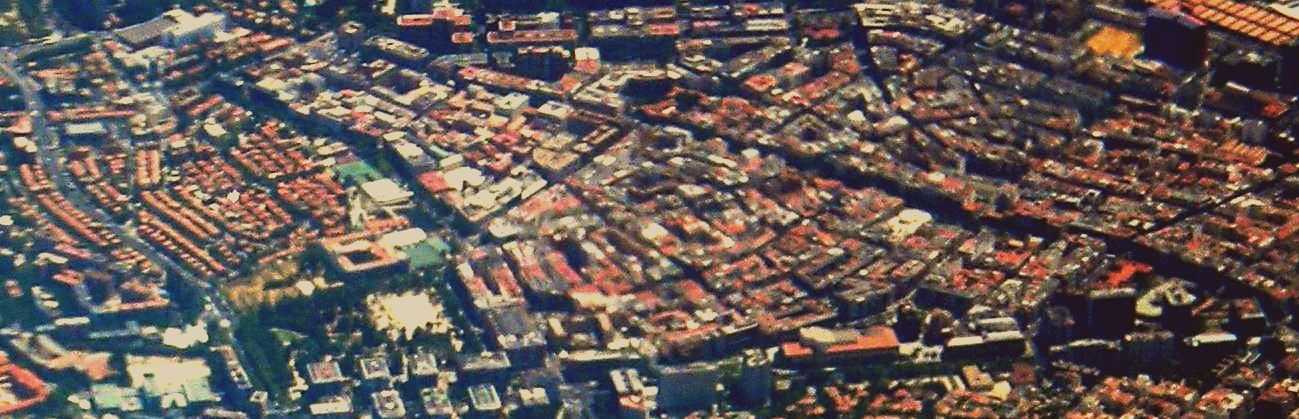
- Interactive map of Ciudad Jardín
- Country: Spain
- Region: Community of Madrid
- Municipality: Madrid
- District: Chamartín

Area
  - Total: 0.762371 km^{2} (0.294353 sq mi)

Population (2020)
  - Total: 18,973
  - Density: 24,887/km^{2} (64,457/sq mi)

Ciudad Jardín (Garden City) is an administrative neighborhood (barrio) of Madrid belonging to the district of Chamartín. It is located between Calle Príncipe de Vergara, Avenida Ramón y Cajal and Calle López de Hoyos, the latter being one of the longest streets in the city and well known for its great commercial activity.

It has an area of 0.762371 km^{2} (0.294353 sq mi). As of 1 March 2020, it has a population of 18,973.

== History ==
The Ciudad Jardín neighborhood is historically linked to Prosperidad, having been a part of the same suburb since its origins in 1862. Since 1898, the present Ciudad Jardín was integrated into the Prosperidad neighborhood, which belonged to the Buenavista district. In 1955 the town hall of Madrid added the town of Chamartín de la Rosa to the municipality as a new district, incorporating the Prosperidad neighborhood. A 1987 municipal decree divided Prosperidad in two different neighborhoods, Prosperidad and Ciudad Jardín, using the Calle de López de Hoyos as a limit, the commercial axis of the early neighborhood. This placed the "Plaza de Prosperidad" and the Prosperidad Metro station in Ciudad Jardín, not in Prosperidad.

== Demographics ==
The number of inhabitants in the last 10 years or so.

Demographic Evolution
2005	2006	2007	2008	2009	2010	2011	2012	2013	2014
18,516	18,623	18,791	18,828	18,951	18,953	18,874	18,532	18,467	18,140
Source: Padrón Municipal de Habitantes

== Transport ==
=== Cercanías Madrid ===
The closest station is Nuevos Ministerios (C-1, C-2, C-3, C-4, C-7, C-8 y C-10) in the El Viso neighborhood. There is no direct connection between the neighborhood and line 6 or line 8. Although it is much further, the Recoletos station (C-1, C-2, C-7, C-8 y C-10) does have a direct connection to the neighborhood on line 4.

=== Madrid Metro ===
The 4 and 9 lines service the neighborhood as follows:

- The 4 line borders the neighborhood to the south with the Prosperidad and Alfonso XIII stations.
- The 9 line borders the neighborhood to the west with the Cruz del Rayo and Concha Espina stops.

=== Buses ===
The neighborhood has plentiful access to a variety of bus lines, including:

Line	Stop
1	Pza. Cristo Rey – Prosperidad
9	Sevilla – Hortaleza
16	Moncloa – Avda. Pío XII
19	Pza. Cataluña – Pza. Legazpi
29	Avda. Felipe II – Manoteras
40	Tribunal – Alfonso XIII
43	Avda. Felipe II – Estrecho
52	Puerta del Sol – Santamarca
72	Diego de León – Hortaleza
73	Diego de León – Canillas
120	Plaza de Lima – Hortaleza
N1	Pza. Cibeles – Sanchinarro
N2	Pza. Cibeles – Hortaleza
