= Church of San Agustín (Madrid) =

Roman Catholic church located in Madrid, Spain

- Iglesia parroquial de San Agustín
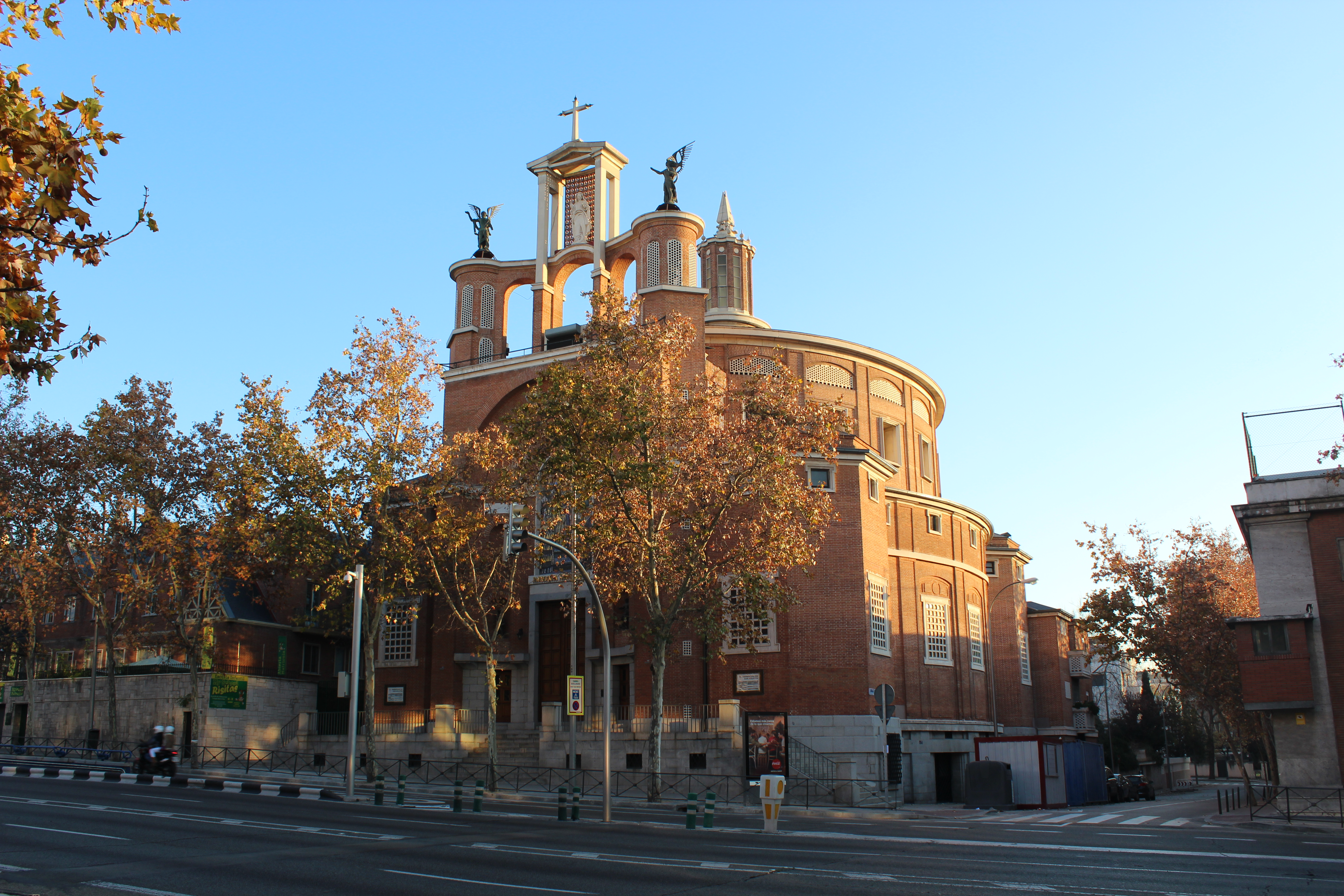
- Interactive map of the Church of San Agustín area

General information
- Type: church
- Classification: Bien de Interés Cultural
- Location: Calle de Joaquín Costa, Madrid, Spain
- Coordinates: 40.44566389°N 3.687275°W
- Construction started: 1946
- Completed: 1950

Design and construction
- Architect: Luis Moya Blanco

The Church of San Agustín is a Roman Catholic church located in Madrid, Spain.

It is located on Calle de Joaquín Costa, in the El Viso neighborhood. Designed by Luis Moya Blanco in 1941, construction started in 1946 and lasted until 1950. Described as "one of the best examples of 20th century religious architecture in the Community of Madrid", it was declared Bien de Interés Cultural in 2019.

== See also ==
- Catholic Church in Spain
- List of oldest church buildings
