= El fulgor y la sangre =

First edition (publ. Planeta)

El fulgor y la sangre (Brilliance and blood is the meaning in English) is the first novel written by Spanish writer Ignacio Aldecoa, first published in 1954.

== Short synopsis ==
In the closed and ruinous environment of a barracks lost in a Spanish mountain range, the wives of some civil guards receive news that one of them has died. Without knowing about whom the news is, they await distressedly for the confirmation of the deceased's identity.

== Expanded synopsis ==
=== Mediodía (12:00) ===
This is narrated from the point of view of Pedro. The telephone rings and we learn that someone has died. Ruipérez says not to tell the women about what has just happened.

=== Dos de la tarde (14:00) ===
This chapter focuses on what has happened to Sonsoles. Firstly that her father was murdered by the other villagers, but it is not stated whether this murder was carried out due to political or personal reasons. Because the village is not named, was it in a nationalist or republican zone within Spain? Sonsoles also became a nun, but left in order to care for her ill grandmother.

=== Tres de la tarde (15:00) ===
In this chapter Felisa's life is discussed. Her father and brother were left wingers and she rebels against them by marrying Ruipérez.

=== Cuatro y media de la tarde (16:30) ===
María is advised by her father to obtain a career, so she becomes a teacher, which is a revered position, alongside being mayor or the local priest. She has thus gained status although loses this when the Republic comes into power. She married Baldomero but doesn't love him.

=== Seis de la tarde (18:00) ===
The madrileña Carmen's life is flashbacked in this sequence. We learn that she was an apprentice in a hair salon in Madrid under a woman called Asunción, an anarchist.

=== Siete de la tarde (19:00) ===
Here we learn about what has happened in Ernesta's life. We see previously that she is younger than the other women and had worked as a maid for a wealthy family. The son of the wealthy family comes back from the war a cripple and his girlfriend leaves him and he becomes embittered as a result.

== Characters ==
Felisa and Ruipérez.
María and Baldomero.
Ernesta and Guillermo.
Francisco - who has lunch and dines at Ernesta and Guillermo's house.
Pedro and Sonsoles. They have a son, also called Pedro.
Carmen and Cecilio Jiménez, who are from Madrid. Their son is described by Pedro as 'pale and thin'.

== Narrative style ==
The narrative style within El fulgor y la sangre is told from the third person.

== Setting ==
The story is set in an army barracks in an unknown setting in Castille in Spain. The army barracks in the novel itself is described as a 'castle'. The block itself is divided into six sections, five for the civil guards and their families and the other for the corporal who is single.

== Structure ==
Structurally the novel flicks between the past and present via a series of flashbacks in each chapter.

== Editions available (in Spanish) ==
ISBN 84-239-7387-5
