= Monument to Isabella the Catholic (Madrid) =

Isabella the Catholic
- Isabel la Católica
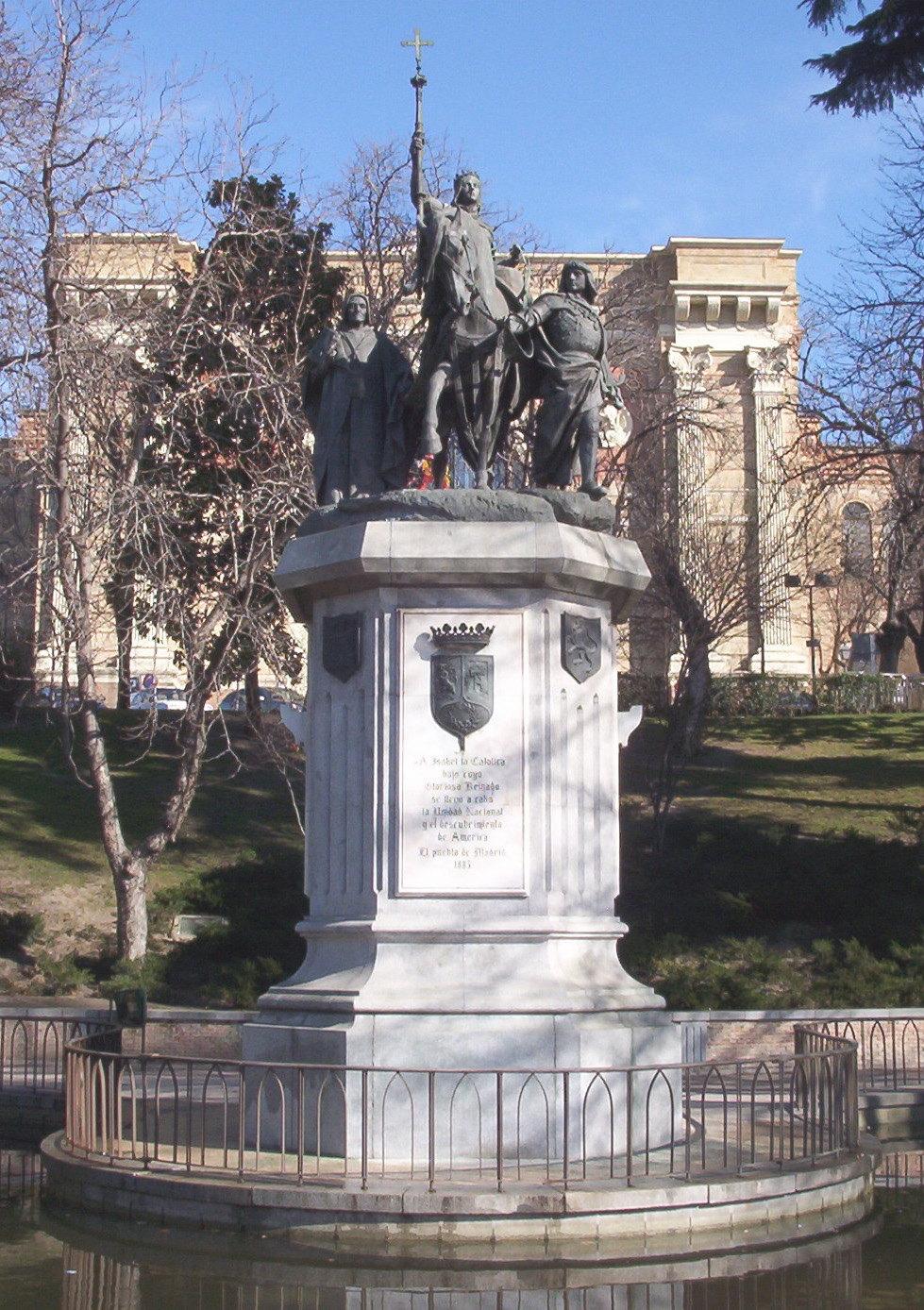
- 40.440315°N 3.690756°W
- Location: Paseo de la Castellana, Madrid, Spain
- Designer: Manuel Oms
- Opening date: 30 November 1883
- Dedicated to: Isabella of Castile

The Monument to Isabella the Catholic (Spanish: Monumento a Isabel la Católica) is an instance of public art located in Madrid, Spain. A work by Manuel Oms, the monument is a sculptural bronze ensemble consisting of an equestrian statue of Isabella of Castile, accompanied by Pedro González de Mendoza and Gonzalo Fernández de Córdoba.

== History and description ==
The bronze piece was cast at Nelli's foundry in Rome and it was exhibited in the later city before its transfer to Madrid.

It was officially inaugurated by the Ayuntamiento de Madrid on 30 November 1883. As described by Pedro de Madrazo, the sculptural group comprised three statues: an equestrian statue representing Isabella, who appears dressed in armour and with a royal crown and mantle, carrying the sceptre in one hand and the bridles of the horse in the other; the statue of the Cardinal of Spain Pedro González de Mendoza, dressed in a cassock with the book of the Gospels in his right hand and leaning the other on one of the bridles of the Queen's horse; and the statue of the great captain Gonzalo Fernández de Córdoba, armed from the tip of his head, with his naked sword in his left hand, and holding the other bridle of the horse with his right hand; all three statues are supported by a bronze basement.

The monument was moved from its original location to a location near the Paseo de la Castellana, in the gardens placed at the feet of the National Museum of Natural Sciences.

The pedestal features the coat of arms of Madrid and those of the Catholic Monarchs, and an engraved inscription reads: "To Isabella the Catholic, under whose glorious reign national unity and the discovery of the Americas took place. The People of Madrid. 1883." This text was criticised by Pedro de Madrazo in 1883 as lacking in historical rigour, based on issues such as certain events fulfilling the aforementioned "national unity" happening after the death of Isabella in 1504 (the formal independence of Aragon did not come to an end until the death of Ferdinand of Aragon in 1516 or the annexation of Navarre to Castile in 1515).

It has been highlighted as a notable example of the exaltation of Spanish nationalism during the Restoration in the Spanish capital's public art. The ensemble has been also analyzed as an example of a visual representation of a woman tutored (guided in this case) by masculine figures.
