= Castilla (Madrid) =

Coordinates: 40°28′30″N 3°40′44″W

- City neighborhood
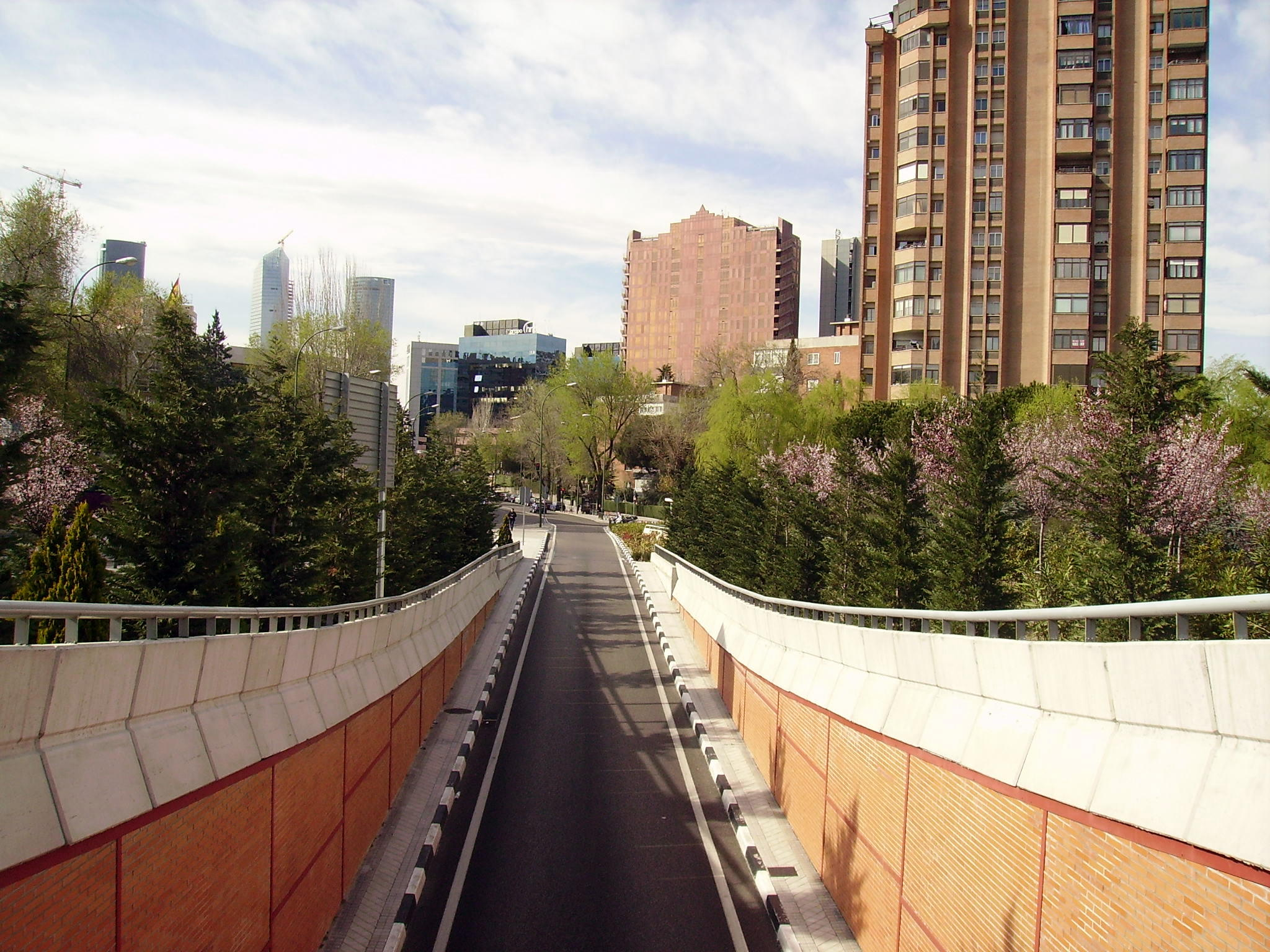

- Country: Spain
- Region: Community of Madrid
- Municipality: Madrid
- District: Chamartín

Castilla is an administrative neighborhood (barrio) of Madrid belonging to the district of Chamartín.
