= Cidones =

- Municipality
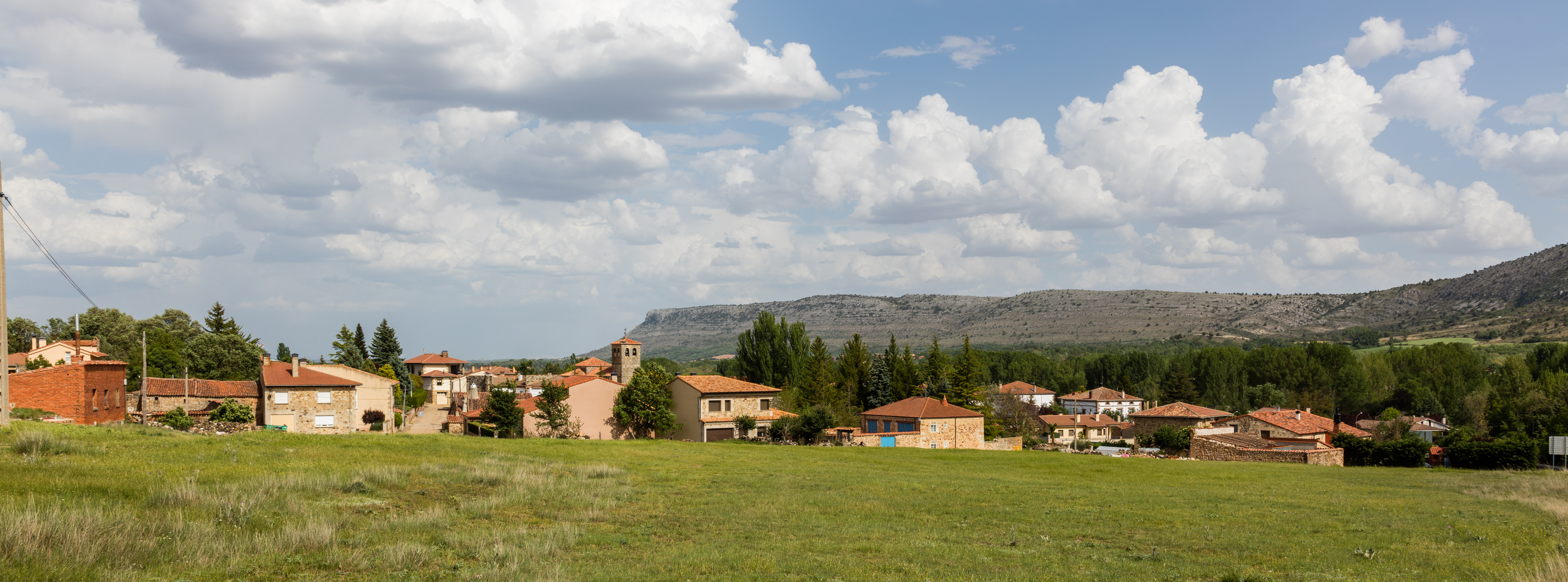
- View of Cidones, Soria, Spain

- Location in Spain. Cidones (Spain)
- Country: Spain
- Autonomous community: Castile and León
- Province: Soria
- Municipality: Cidones

Area
  - Total: 70 km^{2} (27 sq mi)

Population (2025-01-01)
  - Total: 313
  - Density: 4.5/km^{2} (12/sq mi)
- Time zone: UTC+1 (CET)
  - Summer (DST): UTC+2 (CEST)
- Website: Official website

Cidones is a municipality located in the province of Soria, Castile and León, Spain. According to the 2004 census (INE), the municipality has a population of 357 inhabitants.
