= Nueva España (Madrid) =

Coordinates: 40°27′47″N 3°40′39″W

- City neighborhood
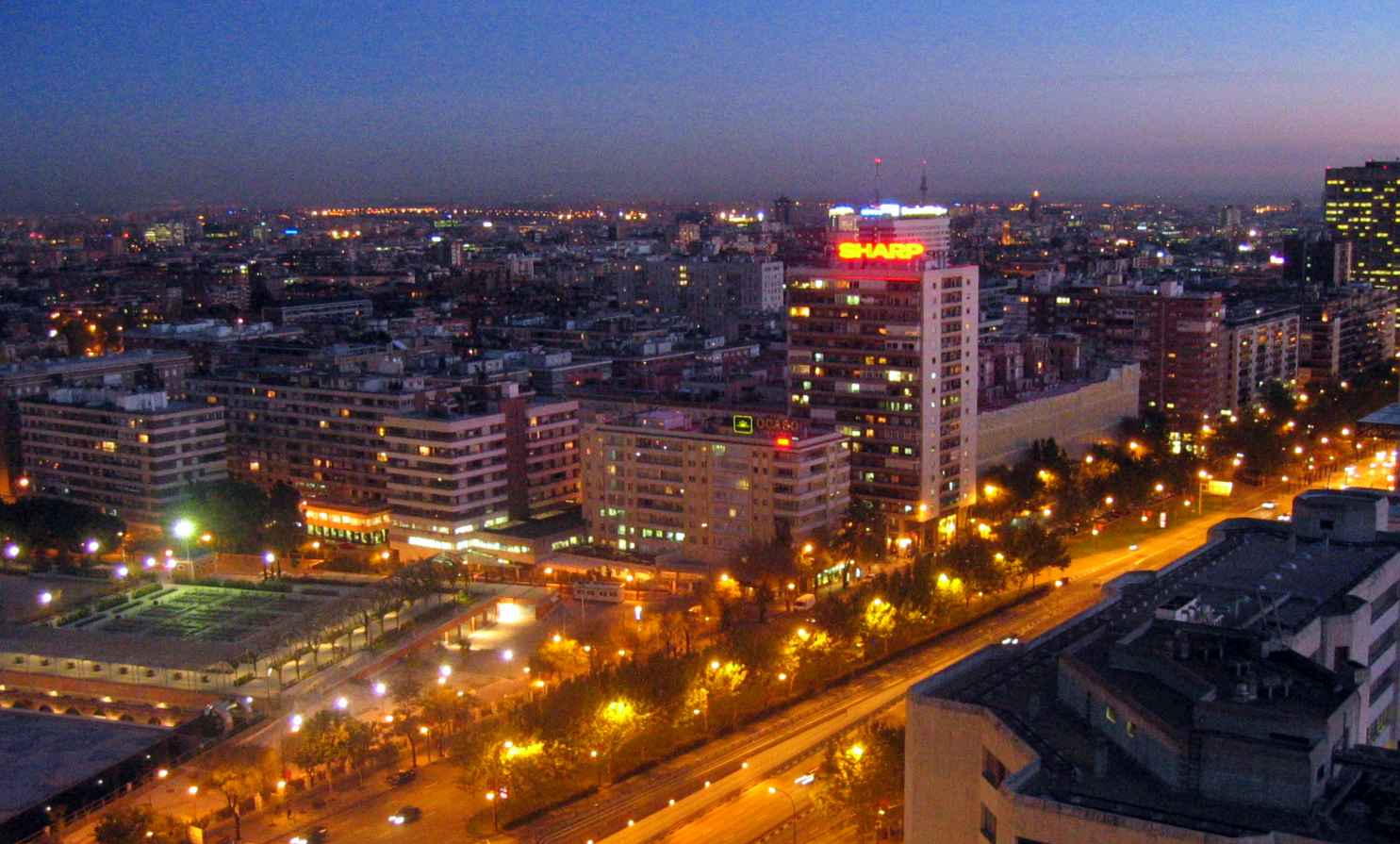

- Country: Spain
- Region: Community of Madrid
- Municipality: Madrid
- District: Chamartín

Nueva España is an administrative neighborhood (barrio) of Madrid, belonging to the district of Chamartín.

The ward is notable for its strong public transportation, the concentration and quality of its schools (mostly private or selective) and its high level of income. Famous inhabitants of the ward (both current and former) include: Florentino Pérez (president of the Real Madrid Football Club), Gloria Fuertes (renowned poet).
