= El Viso (Madrid) =

Coordinates: 40.4444°N 3.6888°W

- City neighborhood
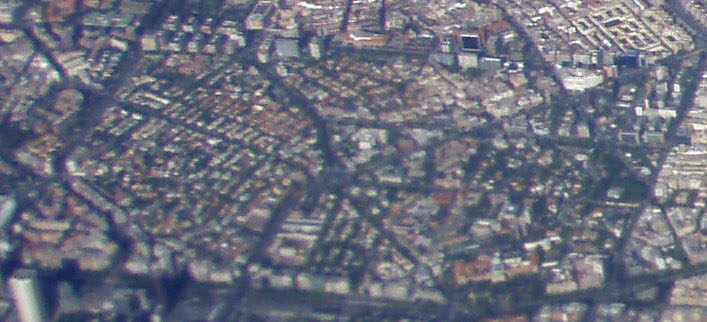
- Interactive map of El Viso
- Country: Spain
- Region: Community of Madrid
- Municipality: Madrid
- District: Chamartín

Area
  - Total: 1.71 km^{2} (0.66 sq mi)

Population (2020)
  - Total: 17,502
  - Density: 10,200/km^{2} (26,500/sq mi)

El Viso (Spanish pronunciation: [el ˈβiso]) is a neighborhood of Madrid, part of the Chamartín District. Consisting mainly of residential detached houses, it is currently the wealthiest neighborhood of the Spanish capital, overtaking the Salamanca District. Aristocrats, businessmen, politicians and diplomats have inhabited this area for half a century. The neighborhood also hosts the main headquarters of the Spanish National Research Council (CSIC).

It features a roughly rectangular shape, limited by the Paseo de la Castellana, the Avenida de Concha Espina, the Calle del Príncipe de Vergara and the Calle de María de Molina. It has an area of 1.708046 km^{2} (0.659480 sq mi). As of 1 March 2020, it has a population of 17,502 .

== See also ==
- Church of San Agustín (Madrid)
- Monument to José Martí (Madrid)
