= Venta (establishment) =

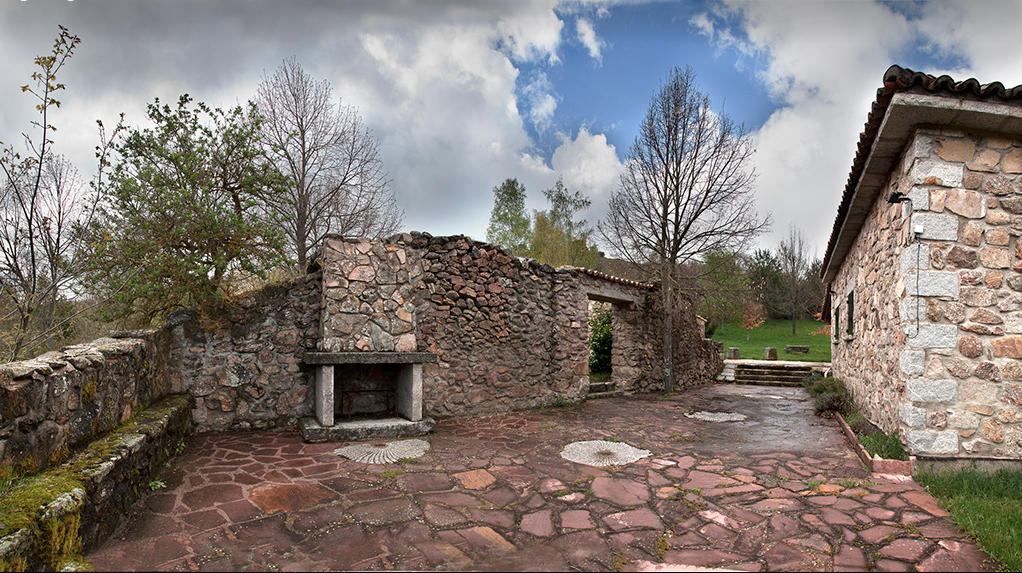
Ruins and reconstruction of the Venta de Cornejo (14th century).

A venta, ventorro or ventorrillo is an establishment or building of ancient tradition in Spain and some other Hispanic countries located near paths or unpopulated areas, and later near roads or service stations. They can be considered as an equivalent to inns, though their main characteristic feature is the fact that they are almost always isolated, contrary to mesones and posadas which are located near or inside towns and villages.

Throughout their history, ventas have offered food and accommodation to travellers. In Spain, their antiquity is well referenced and documented by literature, like in The Book of Good Love (ca. 1330) or Don Quixote (1615), or in paintings like La riña en la Venta Nueva of Francisco Goya. Use of the term has also been registered in some Hispanic-American countries, like the Venta de Aguilar, the first one established in the Mexico-Veracruz road, or the popular Venta de Perote, both in Mexico.

== Description ==
Although the architectural structure may vary according to the popular models of each region or country, the ventas (which can be traced back to the Middle Ages), have in common their location, almost always isolated, in royal crossroads, paths, etc. Other similarities are: a big wooden door made accessible for carriages, which sometimes was the only access to the building; the stables and pens to accommodate the transiting livestock; haystacks to accommodate the muleteers and rooms, usually quite primitive, for traders, dealers and travellers. There were also a big kitchen and dining room in the first floor, a walled courtyard (sometimes more than one, and usually paved) with a well, troughs and a staircase to access the gallery and second floor, along with other storage rooms.

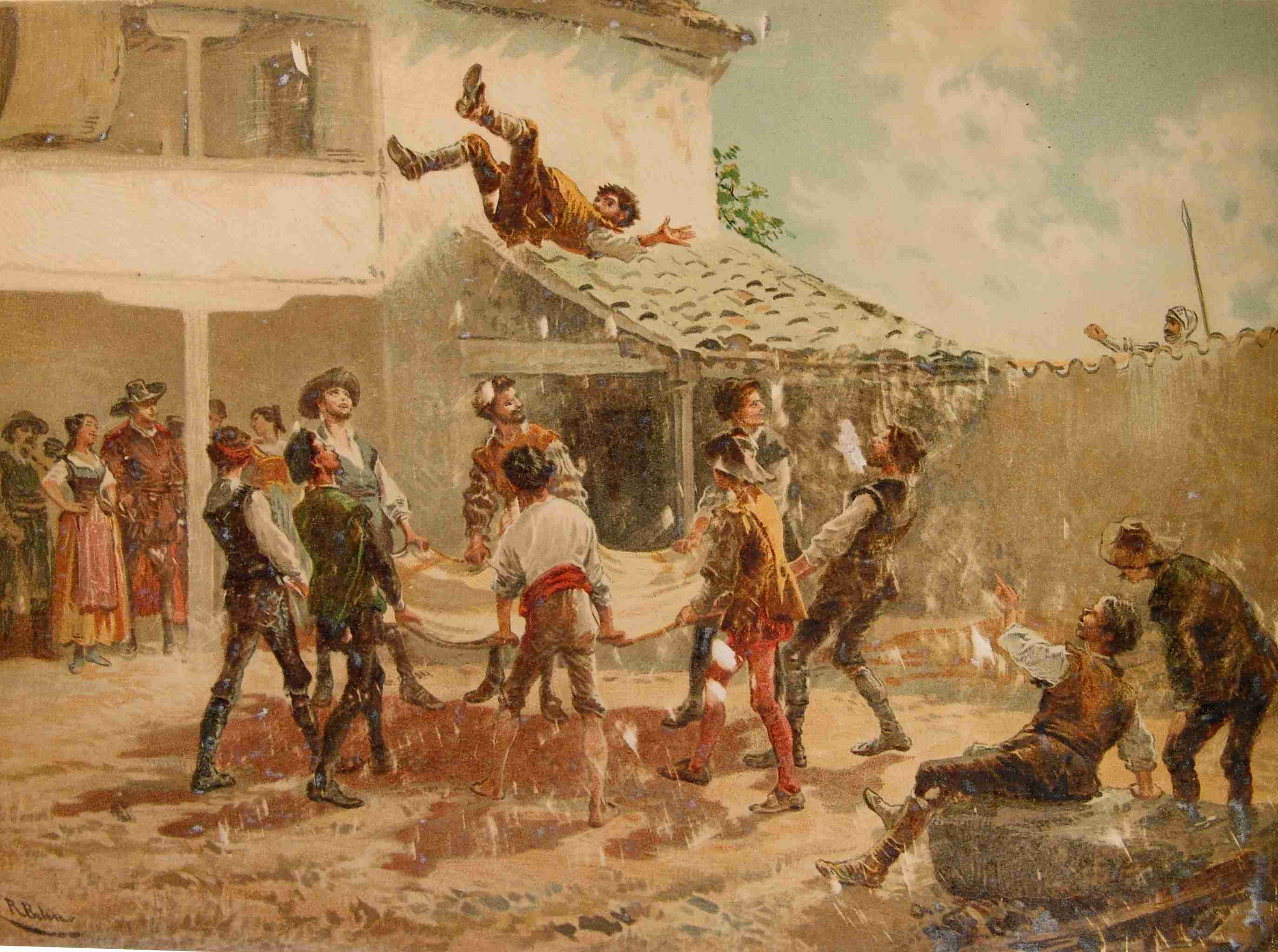
The manteo of Sancho Panza in the pen of the venta. Illustration by Ricardo Balaca (ca. 1880–1883).

Taking as a reference the famous Venta de Quesada, that travellers, chroniclers and investigators have often identified as the venta-castle in which Alonso Quijano became knight, we have to consider its location in the Camino Real de Madrid a Sevilla, and as a provisioning point for the ventas of the Cañada Real Soriana Oriental. Although this venta of La Mancha, in ruins already in the 19th century, disappeared in the middle of the 20th century and there only remain some material remnants and the toponym in old maps, many scholars have studied its structure based on documents like the description by the traveller Alexandre Dumas circa 1846:

As to the venta de Quesada, it is a sort of half-ruined castle, whose two angular turrets are eaten away by the hand of time, and whose main body has a unique door like a melancholic eye, which leads to a forecourt covered with manure and straw. In the turrets, or rather in the middle of those turrets, because the time that has eaten away the angles has also cracked the center; in the middle of those turrets, there is a row of embrasures.

In the venta de Quesada I counted two windows that announce a second floor. Three other picturesquely disordered small openings illuminate the low room. A fourth hole overlooks a small room that may have been the one that housed the chivalric library that the good priest burned down without more mercy than Caliph Omar when he burned down the Library of Alexandria.

— Alexandre Dumas (ca. 1846).

=== In Navarre and the Basque Country ===
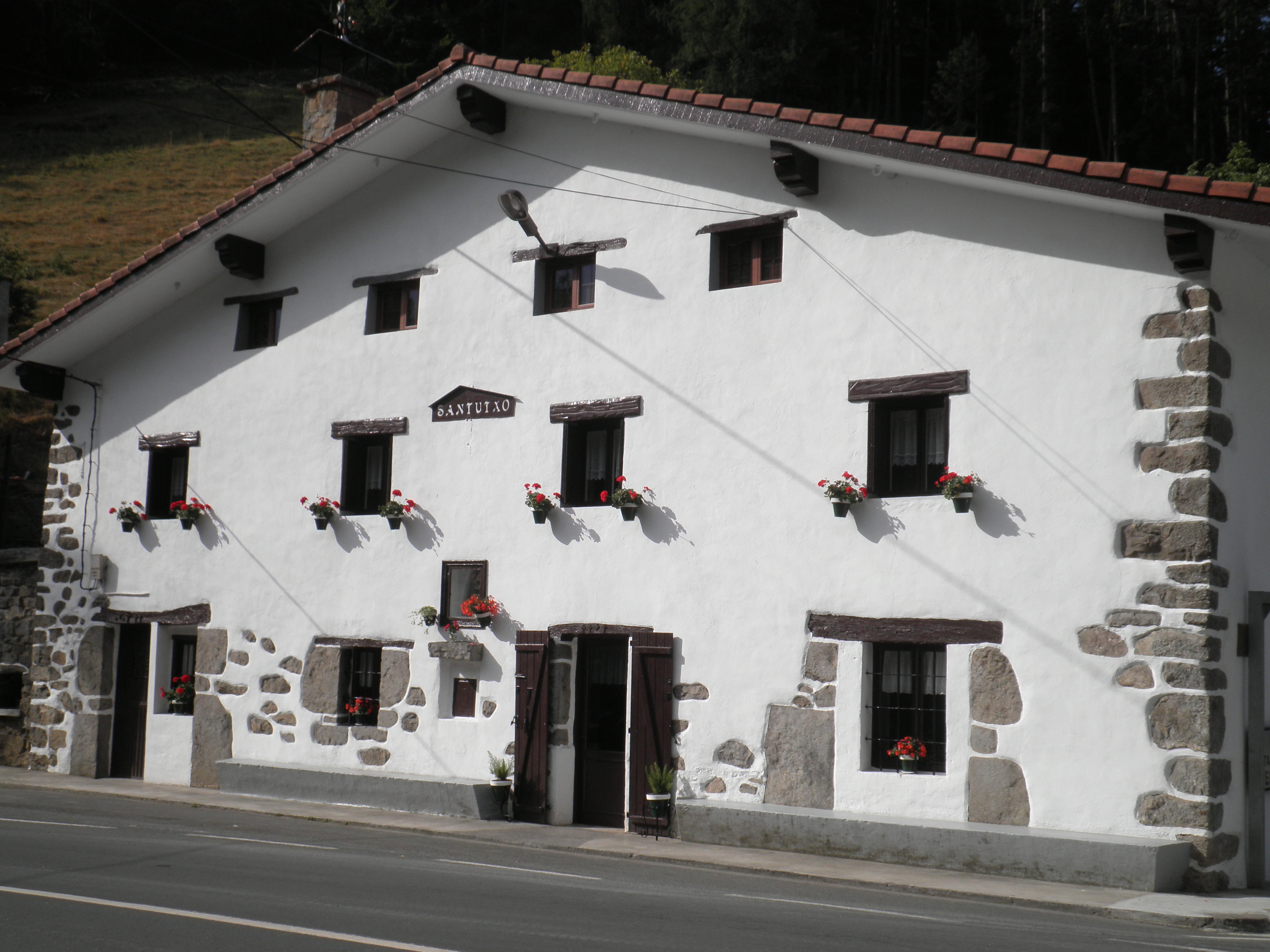
The Benta de Santutxo, in Albiztur.

Along the cornisa cantábrica and with a renewed tradition in Navarre and the Basque Country –on both sides of the Pyrenees–, ventas ("bentas" in Basque or "ventes" in French) have been conserved as establishments with a varied traditional architecture, almost always located in crossroads. During the 21st century they still function as hostels, restaurants and shops. They are also used as places of celebrations and gastronomical gatherings. Their antiquity, as in the rest of Spain, is made patent by the frequency with which toponyms including the word "venta" (or "benta") are found.

=== Heritage protection ===
The ventas of Castilla-La Mancha are a part of the cultural heritage of the region, and they are accordingly protected by law. The ventas of Borondo (Daimiel, Ciudad Real) and de la Inés (Almodóvar del Campo, Ciudad Real) have also been declared as goods of cultural interest.

In paintings, drawings, prints and engravings, the iconography of the ventas is usually associated with costumbrist themes or historical events.

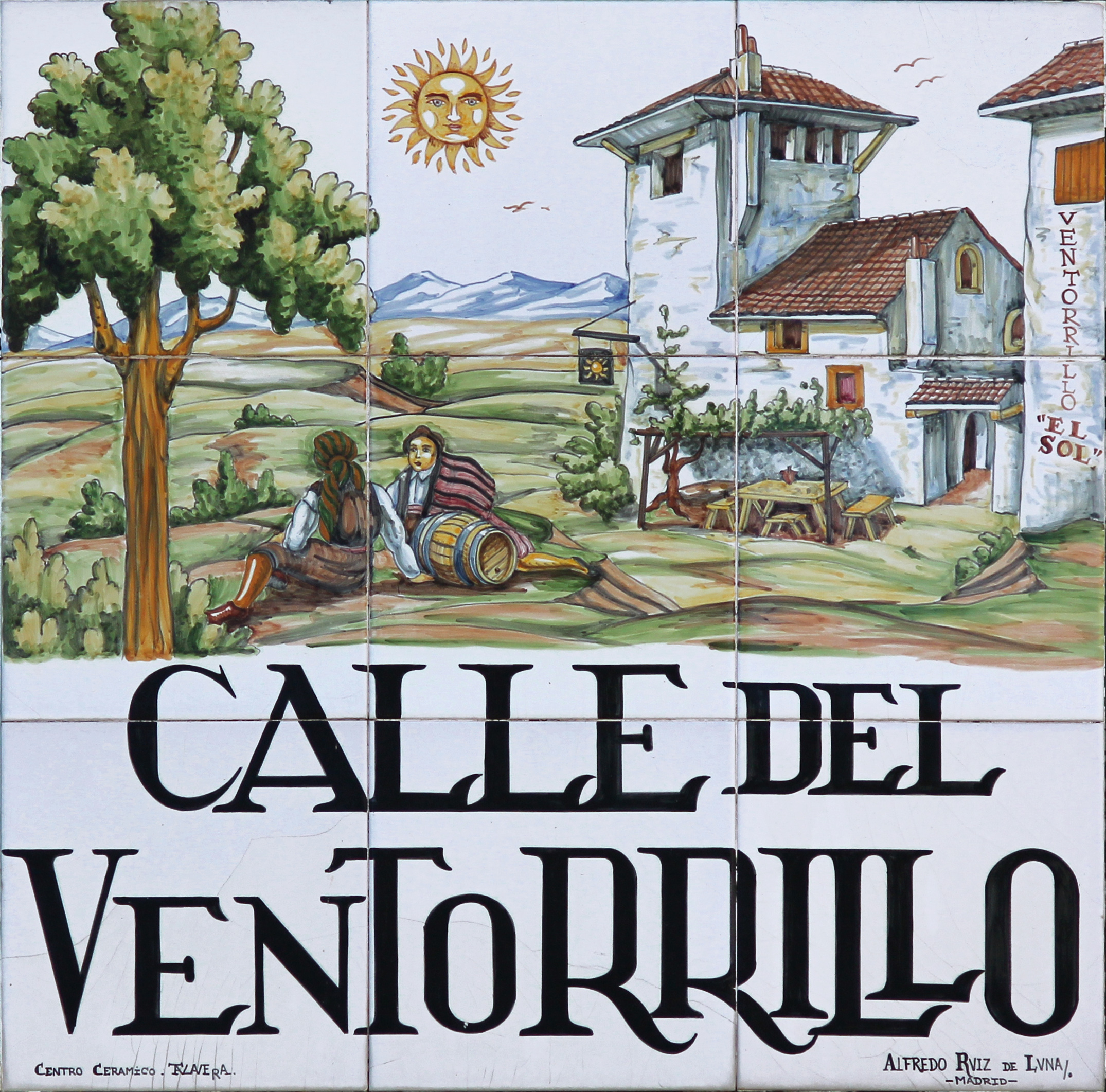
Plaque of the calle del Ventorrillo of Madrid (Spain).

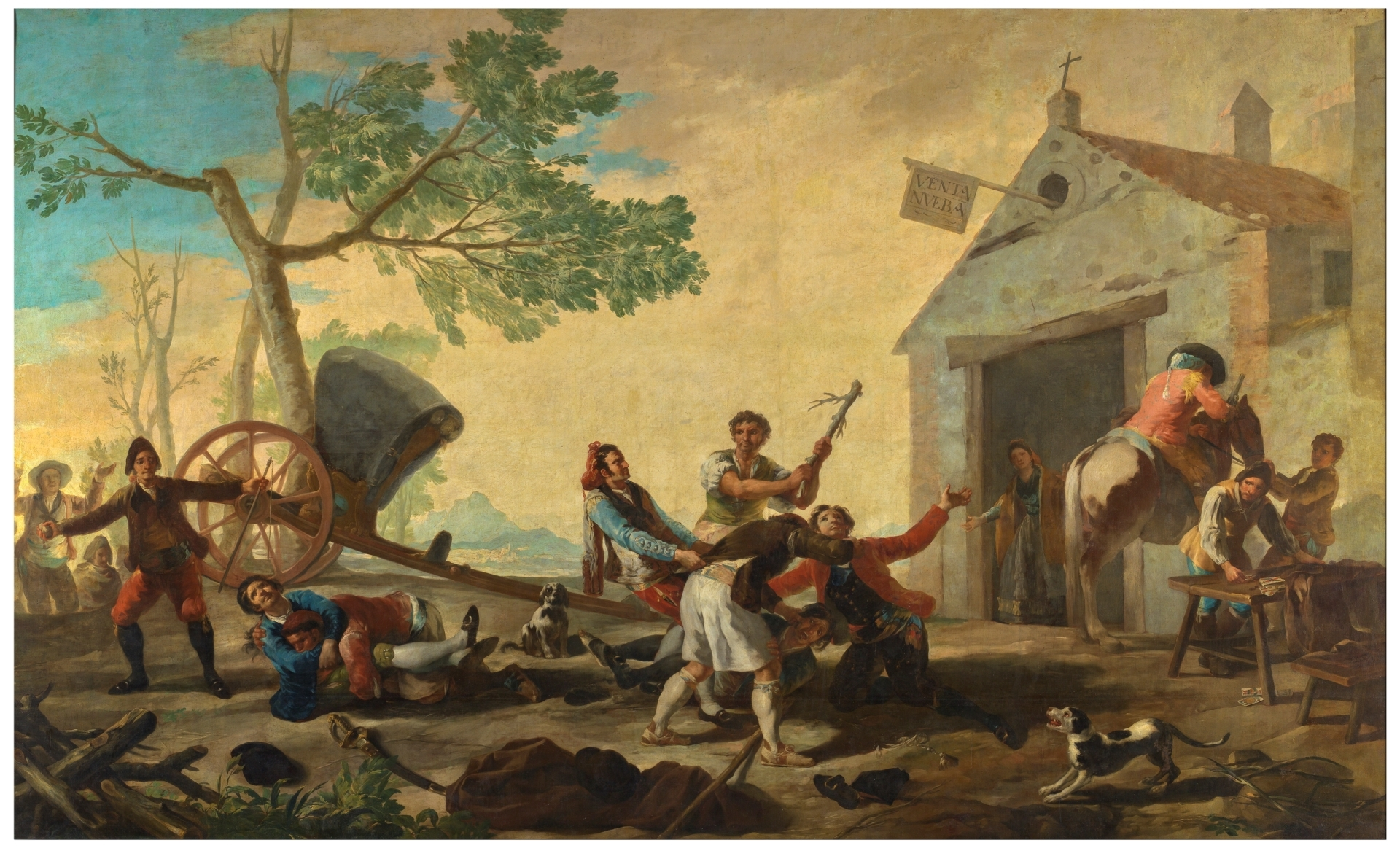
The Venta Nueva in a painting of Francisco de Goya.

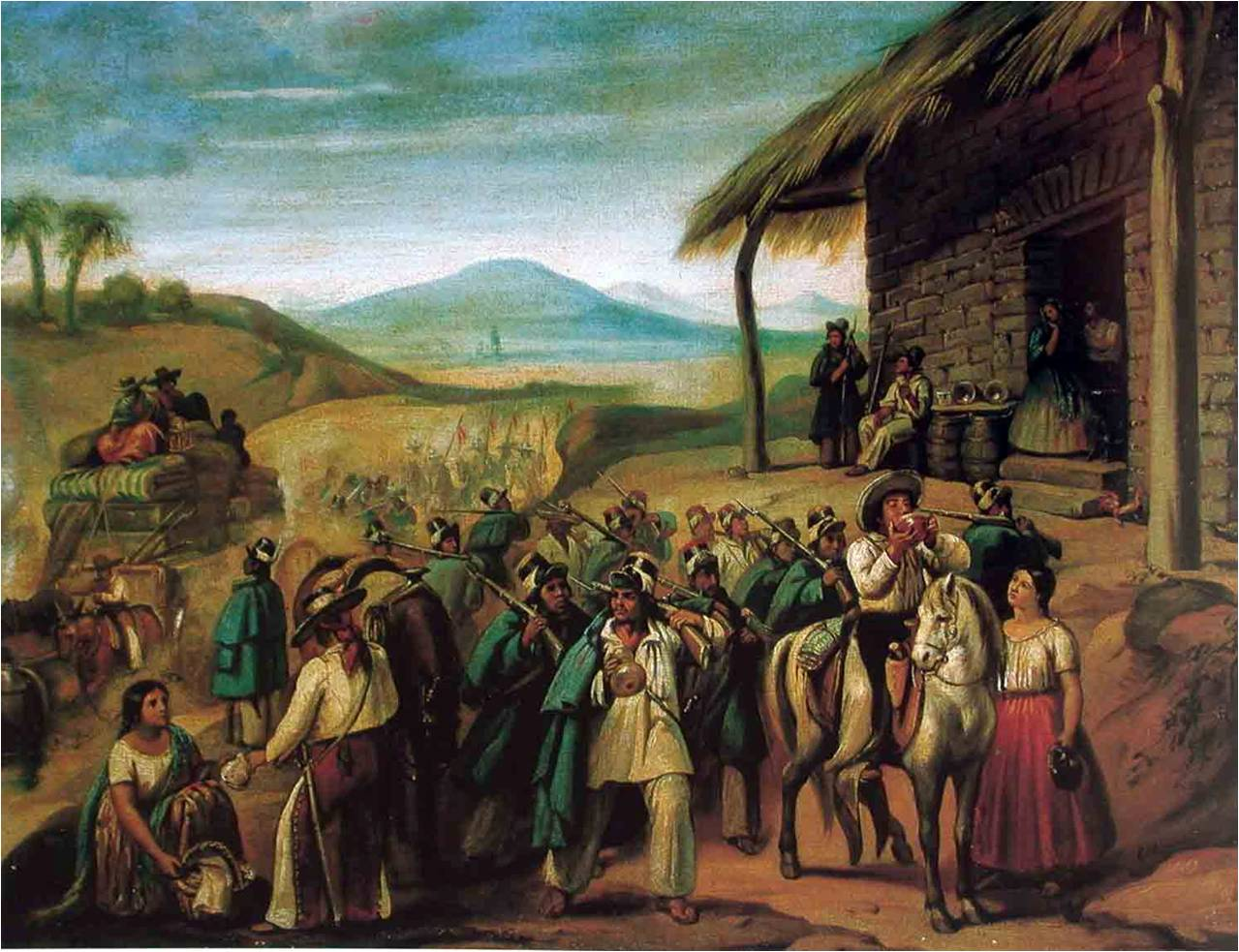
A Mexican venta in 1858, painted by Primitivo Miranda, Museo Nacional de las Intervenciones (INAH).

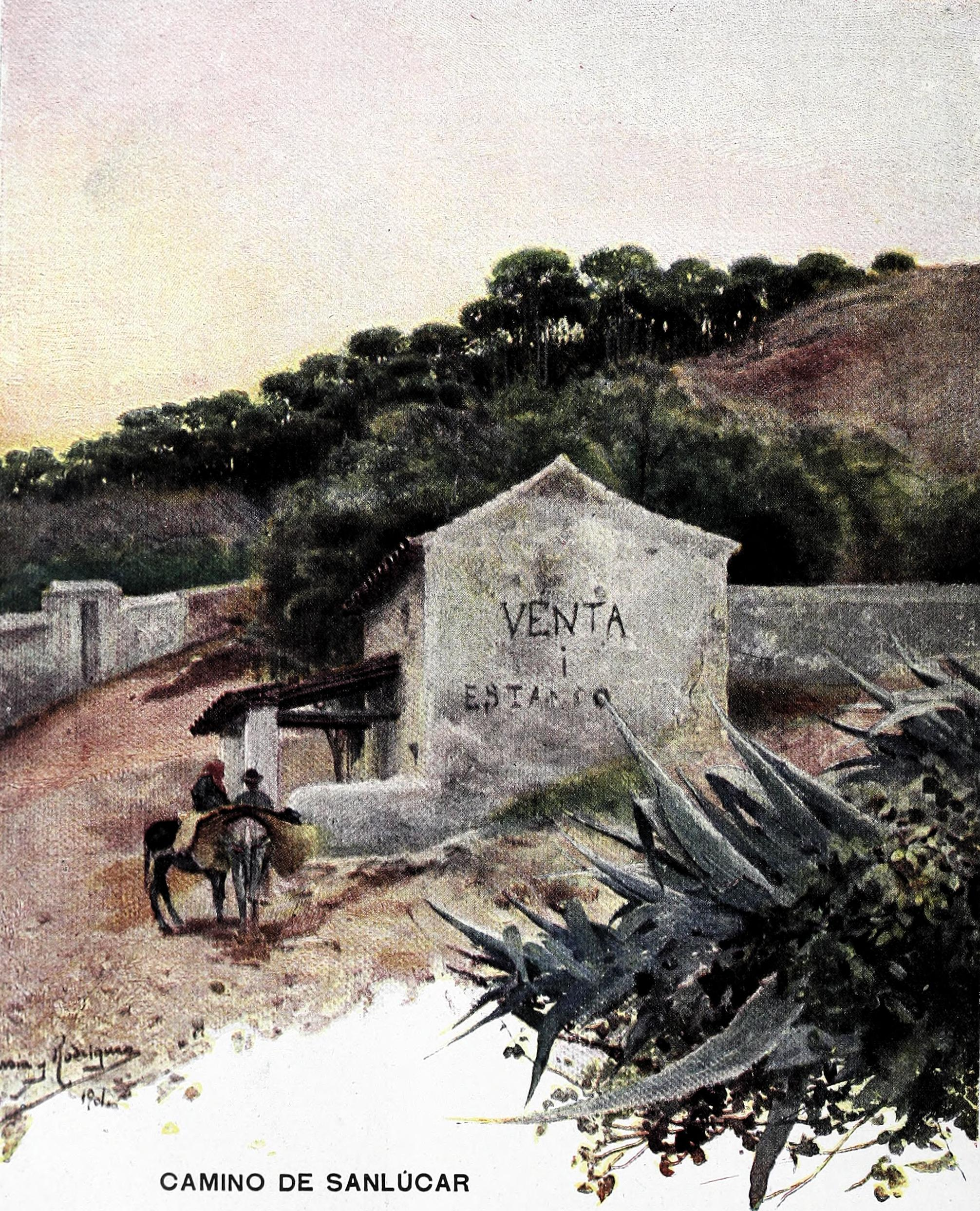
Venta in Andalusia; Blanco y Negro (1901).

== Literary references ==
=== The ventas of Don Quixote ===
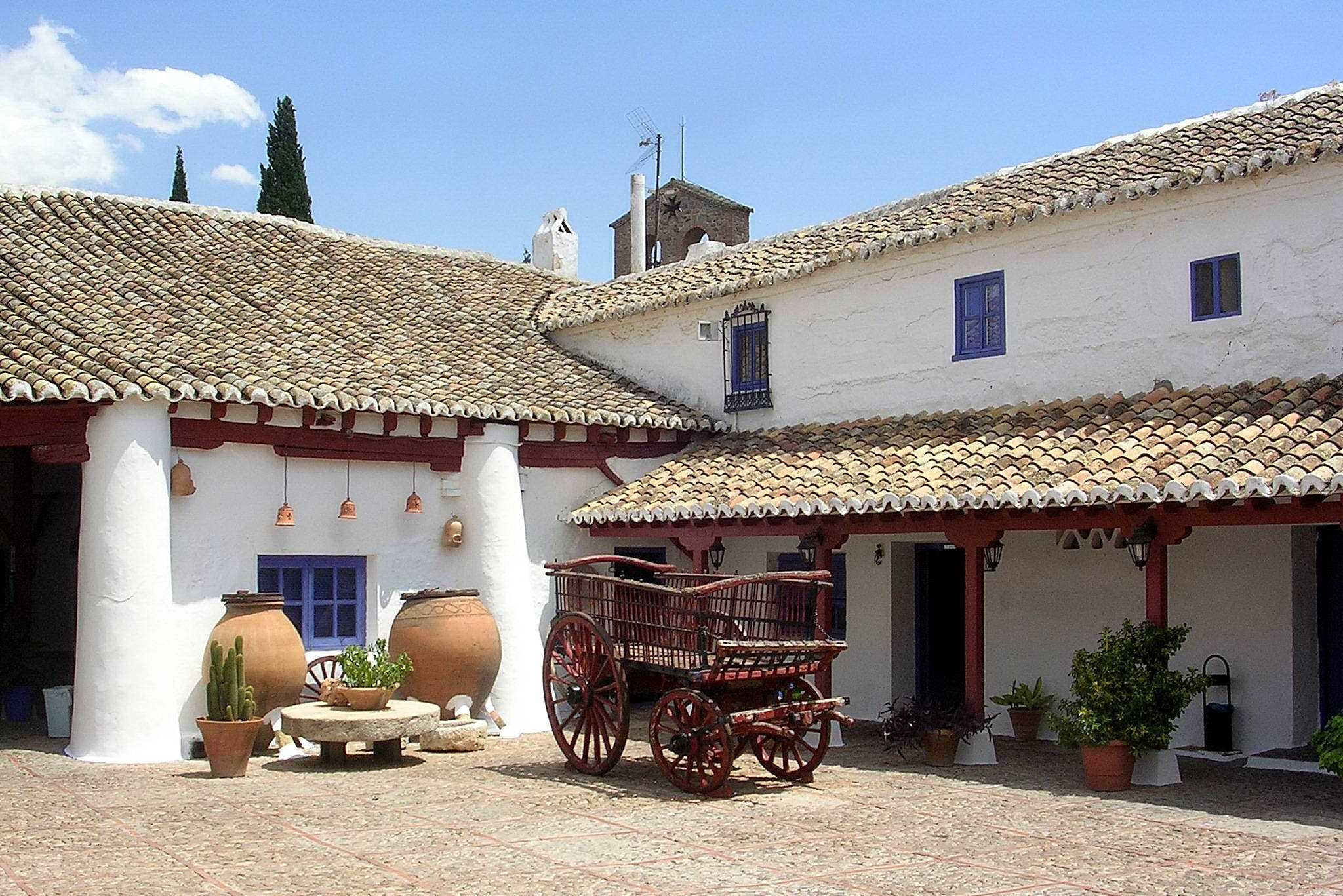
The supposed venta of Don Quixote, in Puerto Lápice, Ciudad Real.

The ventas, as typical constructions of the vernacular architecture of La Mancha, are described in various chapters by Cervantes as the scenery of various adventures and misadventures of the ingenious gentleman Don Quixote de la Mancha; among them, one of the most descriptive episodes may be the one in the second and following chapters of the first part of the novel.

...he was on the road all day, and towards nightfall his hack and he found themselves dead tired and hungry, when, looking all around to see if he could discover any castle or shepherd's shanty where he might refresh himself and relieve his sore wants, he perceived not far out of his road a venta, (Note: Often translated in the English versions as "inn".) which was as welcome as a star guiding him to the portals, if not the palaces, of his redemption; and quickening his pace he reached it just as night was setting in.

— Miguel de Cervantes (1605).

=== The venta of the Archpriest of Hita ===
Various excerpts of The Book of Good Love (1330 and 1343), recount the vicissitudes of Juan Ruiz, Archpriest of Hita in the medieval Venta de Cornejo, establishment in which –according to the author– he slept on various occasions in 1329.

=== The Andalusian venta of Bécquer ===
Gustavo Adolfo Bécquer extensively describes an Andalusian venta in his account titled La Venta de los Gatos, published in November 1862, in the newsapaper El Contemporáneo.

In Seville (...) there is among other famous ventorrillos one that, by the place in which it is located and by its special circumstances, may be said that it was, if it is not already, the most neat and characteristic of all Andalusian ventorrillos. Imagine a house as white as snow is, with its roof of some reddish tiles, others being dark green, and between which grows an endless number of dandelions and reseda bushes. A wooden shed bathes the door lintel in shade, on whose sides there are two brick and mortar benches. Embedded in the wall broken by several small windows open at will to give light to the interior, of which some are lower and others higher, this one in a quadrangular shape, the other imitating a mullioned window or a skylight, one can see at certain intervals some stakes and iron rings used to tie the horses. A very old vine, which twists its blackish trunks through the structure of timbers that supports it, dressing them with branches and wide green leaves, covers like a canopy the dais, which consists of three pine benches, half a dozen rickety cattail chairs and up to six or seven wobbly tables made of badly joined boards. (...)

— Gustavo Adolfo Bécquer (1862).

=== The venta de Cidones ===
In the second edition of Campos de Castilla, Antonio Machado published in 1917 a poem that takes place in the primitive Soriana Venta de Cidones, titled "Al maestro «Azorín» por su libro Castilla". It is considered as one of the defining texts of the most national aspect of the noventayochismo.

The venta (Note: Again often translated as "inn" in English versions.) de Cidones is on the road
between Soria and Burgos. Leonarda, the ventera, (Note: Ventero and ventera refer to the tenants of a venta. It is loosely translated in the text as "the owner's wife".)
whom they call "la Ruipérez", is a little old woman
who stokes the fire on which a pot is boiling.

Ruipérez, the ventero, (Note: Translated as "the husband".) a tiny little oldster
—who has two shrewd eyes under his grey eyebrows—
is gazing silently at the glowing fire.

The pot can be heard bubbling over the flame. (...)

It gets dark inside the venta. The glowing fire smokes.
The wick of a musty oil lamp flames and splutters (...)

Night has now fallen. In the distance can be heard the clatter
and gallop of an approaching vehicle. It is the post-chaise.

— Antonio Machado (1917).

== Non-exhaustive list of ventas ==
=== Andalusia ===
- Venta de la Mascareta

=== Aragon ===
- Venta de la Jaquesa

=== Castilla-La Mancha ===
- Venta de Borondo (BIC)
- Venta de la Inés (BIC)
- Venta de Puerto Lápice
- Venta de Aragoncillo

=== Castile and León ===
- Venta Cornejo
