= Gate of Europe =

Twin-towers in Spain

Europe Gate / Europe's Gate
- Puerta de Europa (Europa's Gate)
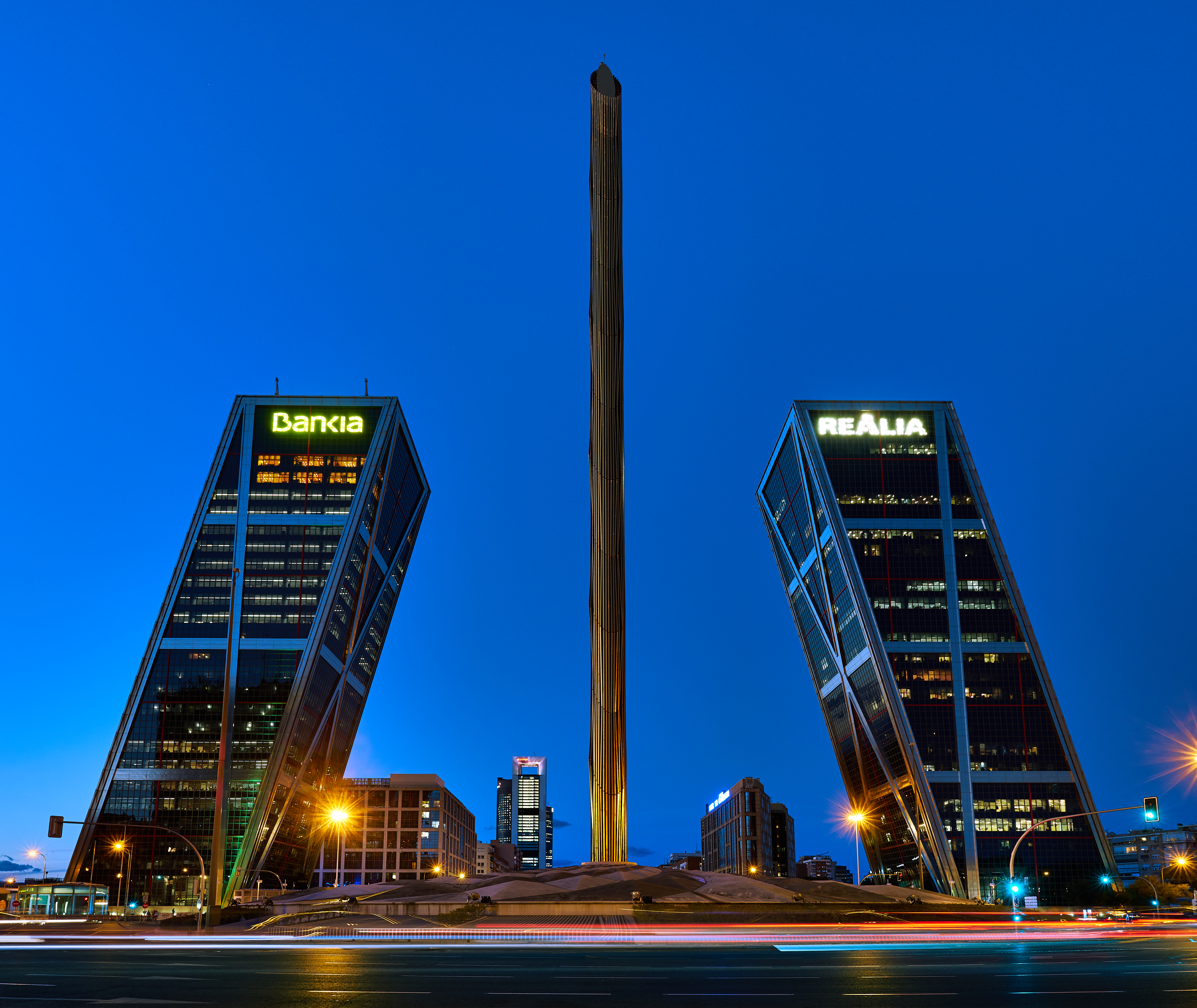
- Interactive map of the Europe Gate / Europe's Gate area

General information
- Status: Completed
- Type: Office
- Location: Paseo de la Castellana 189/216, Madrid, Spain
- Coordinates: 40°27′59″N 3°41′16″W
- Construction started: 1989
- Completed: 1996
- Owner: CaixaBank and Realia

Height
- Roof: 114 m (374 ft)

Technical details
- Floor count: 26
- Lifts/elevators: 8

Design and construction
- Architects: Philip Johnson, John Burgee
- Developer: Kuwait Investment Authority
- Structural engineer: Leslie E. Robertson Associates, RLLP, New York
- Main contractor: FCC

The Gate of Europe towers (Spanish: Puerta de Europa), also known as KIO Towers/"Door of Europa" (Torres KIO), are twin office buildings near the Plaza de Castilla in Madrid, Spain. The towers have a height of 114 m (374 ft) and have 26 floors. They were constructed from 1989 to 1996. The Puerta de Europa is the second tallest twin towers in Spain after the Torres de Santa Cruz in Santa Cruz de Tenerife.

The Gate of Europe towers were designed by the American architects Philip Johnson and John Burgee, built by Fomento de Construcciones y Contratas and commissioned by the Kuwait Investment Office (hence their initial name "Torres KIO" or "KIO Towers"). Leslie E. Robertson Associates, RLLP New York (LERA) provided structural engineering services. Each building is 115 m tall with an inclination of 15°, making them the first inclined skyscrapers in the world. They are located near the Chamartín railway station, on the sides of the Plaza de Castilla bus station, north from the Paseo de la Castellana and near the Cuatro Torres Business Area (CTBA).

After the receivership of Grupo Torras, KIO had to sell the buildings, which are now owned by CaixaBank and Realia.

The west tower has a rooftop helicopter pad outlined in blue; the east tower has a red one.

== In popular culture ==
The towers played a key role in the 1995 movie The Day of the Beast, the climax of which took place on one of the then nearly-completed towers. The towers were also shot in the song sequence "oru koodai sunlight" in the popular Tamil film Sivaji.

They are also seen in an episode of Mickey and the Roadster Racers. The racers must collect a flag from the top of the towers in 'Running of the Roadsters' (episode 5b). They also appear in the racing game Mario Kart Tour in the background of the course 'Madrid Drive'.

== See also ==
- Inclined building
