= Hispanoamérica =

Coordinates: 40°27′20″N 3°40′36″W

- City neighborhood
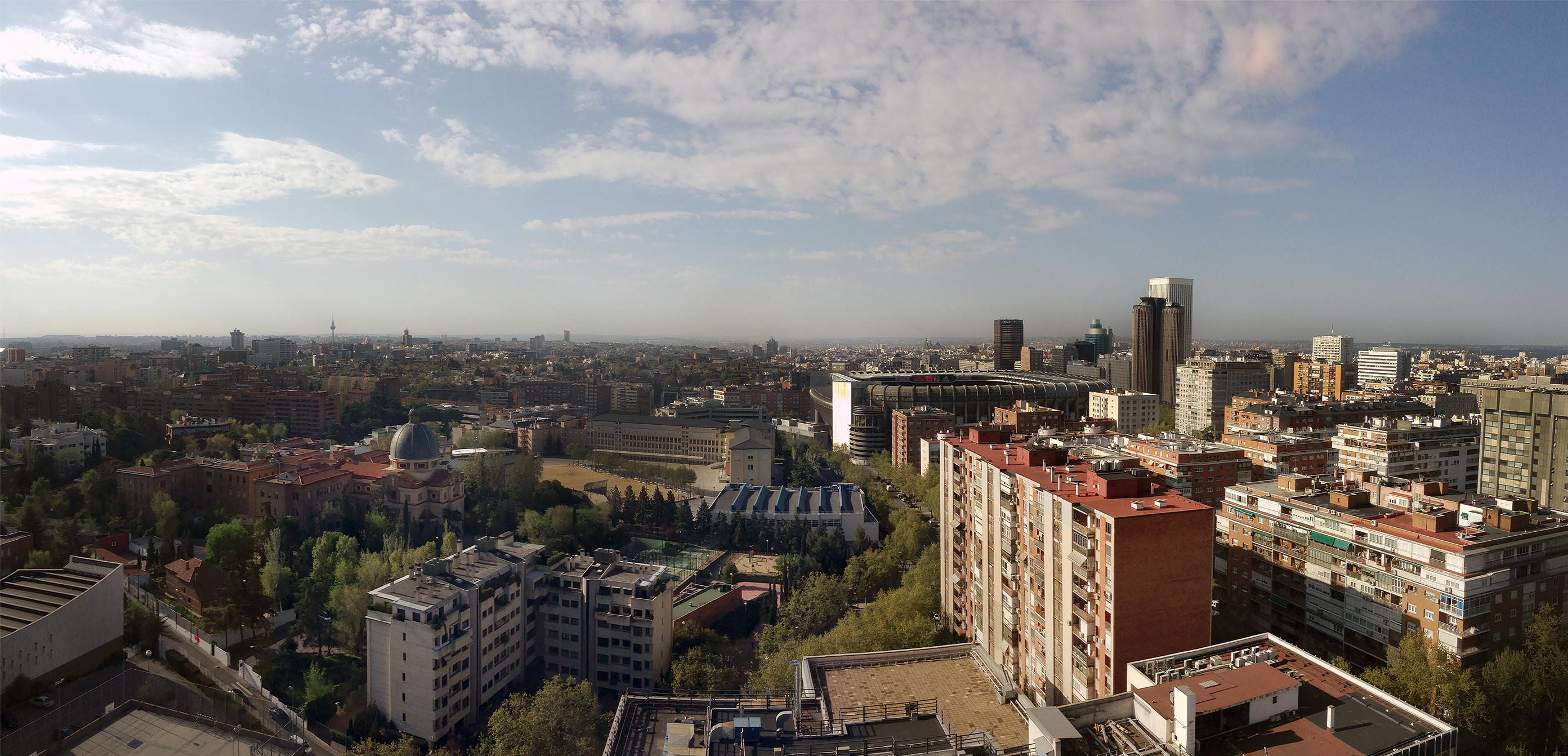
- Interactive map of Hispanoamérica
- Country: Spain
- Region: Community of Madrid
- Municipality: Madrid
- District: Chamartín

Area
  - Total: 1.707406 km^{2} (0.659233 sq mi)

Population (2020)
  - Total: 32,181
  - Density: 18,848/km^{2} (48,816/sq mi)

Hispanoamérica is an administrative neighborhood (barrio) of Madrid belonging to the district of Chamartín.

It has an area of 1.707406 km^{2} (0.659233 sq mi). As of 1 March 2020, it has a population of 32,181.

Several of the placenames in the neighborhood make a reference to locations in Hispanic America, including the plazas of Cuzco, Lima, Ecuador, República Dominicana and Perú, and the streets of Veracruz, Valparaíso, Oruro, Cochabamba, Potosí, Colombia, Uruguay, Nicaragua, Costa Rica, Puerto Rico and Chile.
