= Directorate-General for the Treasury =

- Dirección General del Tesoro
- Logo used by the Public Treasury

Agency overview
- Formed: July 3, 1824; 202 years ago (as Directorate-General for the Royal Treasury)
- Preceding agency: General Treasury of the Kingdom
- Type: Directorate-General
- Jurisdiction: Spanish government
- Headquarters: Paseo del Prado 6 Madrid
- Annual budget: €582.9 million, 2023
- Minister responsible: Carlos Cuerpo, Minister
- Agency executives: Paula Conthe Calvo, Secretary-General for the Treasury; Carla Díaz Álvarez de Toledo, Director-General for the Treasury
- Parent department: General Secretariat for the Treasury
- Website: Spanish Public Treasury

The Directorate-General for the Treasury (DGT) is a component of the Spanish Ministry of Economy, Trade and Business responsible for managing the Public Treasury as well as carry out the government policy on financing and indebtedness. Also, it is in charge of the minting of currency through the Royal Mint as well as other competencies on fighting money laundering and terrorism financing.

The directorate-general dates back to the beginning of the 19th century and originally it belonged to the Ministry of Finance but, since the late-20th century, every time that the Economy Ministry has existed this body has been integrated into it. Also, since 2014 the DGT is integrated in the General Secretariat for the Treasury that supervises and directs the DGT actions.

== History ==
The Spanish Treasury is as old as the Spanish monarchy; however, in centuries past, the treasury was divided between the different kingdoms of the monarchy and each kingdom had its own general treasurer. Upon the arrival of the Bourbon dynasty in 1700 with Philip V, the treasury was centralized, creating the position of General Treasurer of the Kingdom.

=== Early period ===
However, the directorate-general was not created until later, and during the reign of Ferdinand VII, when the modern administration began to take shape. In 1824, the minister of finance, Luis López Ballesteros, approved a general instruction (a kind of royal decree) by which the Crown entrusted the administration of the Royal Treasury to two new bodies: the General Accounting for Distributions and the Directorate-General for the Royal Treasury (DGRT).

The directorate-general was not inaugurated until August 4, 1825, and during the period from its creation until that date, it was still called the General Treasury of the Kingdom.

The DGRT had its own treasury called the Court Treasury and over which the General Accounting Office acted as auditor. The DGRT had the task of collecting the money for the Royal Treasury and distributing it according to what the secretary of the dispatch of the Treasury ordered. Likewise, it was in charge of paying debts and authorizing payments, including those of the Army, as well as making budgetary and expenditure forecasts.

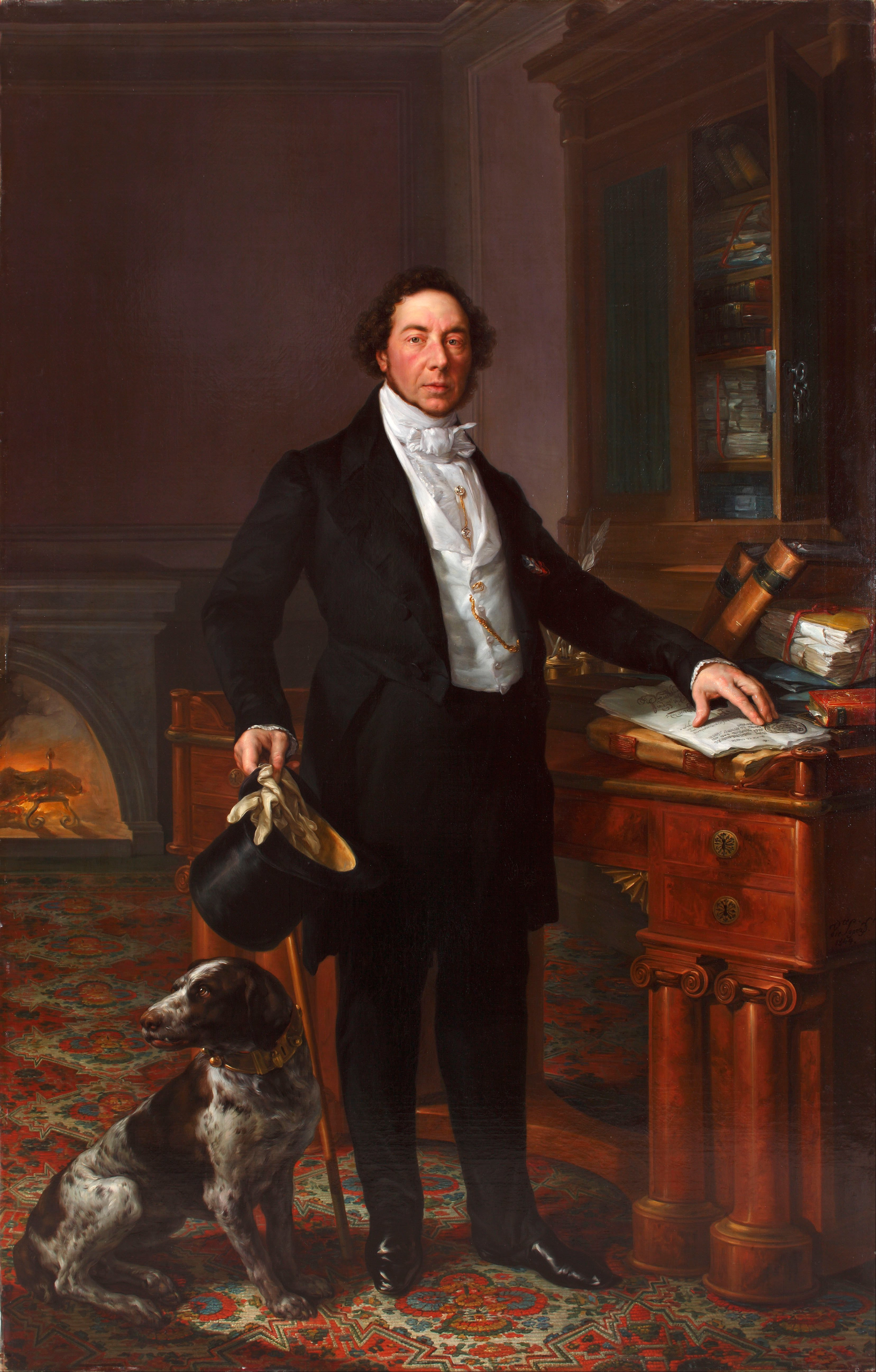
The Marquess of Remisa, Director-General for the Treasury from 1826 to 1833.

The general instruction also provided for a secretariat for the management of the directorate-general and an archive that it was shared with the General Accounting Office to keep all the documents of the predecessor bodies and those that would be generated in the future.

=== Mid-1800s. Consolidation. ===
Since the mid-1830s, the directorate-general was renamed Directorate-General for the Public Treasury and the Undersecretariat of Finance was created as the highest body of the Ministry after the minister himself, and the Under Secretary became the hierarchical superior. As of 1840s, the denomination of Directorate-General for the Public Treasury and Directorate-General for the Treasury was used indifferently, although the first one prevailing.

Due to the refusal of the Bank of San Fernando first and the Bank of Spain after on granting loans to the Public Treasury, the General Deposit Office was created in 1853. This Office had an autonomous directive chart until by decree of July 8, 1873 it became part of the directorate-general.

Since the law of April 29, 1855, there was a permanent commission of six deputies of the Cortes charged with supervising the cargas de justicia—payment obligations contracted by the State in order to compensate the holders of royal donations and privileges, or of rights alienated from the Crown—paid by the Government through the budget and whose administrative body was the directorate-general for the Treasury. The powers over these cargas de justicia were transferred to the Directorate-General for Public Debt on July 1, 1869 and in exchange it received the powers over lottery revenues when the Directorate-General for State Lotteries disappeared.

Between 1873 and 1924 was denominated indifferently of three different forms to this body, varying between Directorate-General for the Treasury, Directorate-General for the Public Treasury and Directorate-General for the Public Treasury and General Ordination of Payments of the State, although maintaining its holder the first of the denominations.

On March 13, 1875, the directorate-general lost the powers it had over the Mint Houses (Casas de la Moneda) that were transferred to the Undersecretariat of Finance and recovered them on February 14, 1882.

The most significant reform since its creation was carried out on December 10, 1895. A Royal Order defined the directorate-general as "the center responsible for covering public obligations and services with the natural income of the budget, and with the funds acquired through banking operations, when those are not sufficient". The body consisted of three departments—one for Order Services, Deposit Office, General Affairs and General Registry; other for General Incomes; and other for Raffles and Lotteries incomes—, a secretariat and a special banking office.

=== 1900s. Political instability. ===
With the dictatorship of Primo de Rivera, the directorate-general changed its name to the Directorate-General for Treasury and Accounting and was granted the powers to draft the budget laws. After the dictatorship, in 1930 a decree-law was approved restoring the Public Treasury Administration and Accounting Act of 1911 and, with it, the denomination of directorate-general for the Public Treasury.

On September 28, 1935, the Directorate-General for Insurance and Savings was abolished and its powers were transferred to this body, changing its name to the Directorate-General for the Treasury and Insurance. Already in the middle of the Civil War, the Republican government unified the ministries of Economy and Finance under a single one and the directorate-general suffered a change of powers, losing the insurance powers in favor of the Directorate-General for Debt, Insurance and Passive Classes and it was renamed Directorate-General for the Treasury, Banking and Savings.

Once the war was over in 1939, it was renamed the Directorate-General for the Treasury. By decree of May 10, 1957 occurs the second major reform of this body, merging the directorate-general with the directorate-general for Public Debt and Passive Classes and creating the Directorate-General for Treasury, Public Debt and Passive Classes. This directorate-general was made up of the deputy directorates-general for the Treasury; for the Public Debt and for the Passive Classes and the General Deposit Fund.

By decree of November 27, 1967, with the objective of reducing the public expenditure of the Administration, the Directorates-General for Budgets and for Insurance were abolished, integrating their powers and bodies into the Directorate-General for the Treasury, which was renamed Directorate-General of the Treasury and Budgets and was formed by eight general deputy directorates, three related to treasury and the others related to Budgets, Investments, Financing and Programming, public salaries, Insurance and Financial Regime of Local Corporations. In addition, since 1973 there was also a general secretariat, with the rank of deputy directorate, within the directorate for the coordination of all its organs.

In October 1976 the name of the general direction was changed to Directorate-General for the Treasury, but without changes in its powers. In 1982 also assumed the powers on financial policy, maintaining this structure until the end of 2011.

Logo of the Bicentennial of the Public Treasury of Spain (1824-2024)

=== General Secretariat ===
Between late 2011 and mid-2014 the directorate-general was suppressed and its powers were assumed by the new General Secretariat for the Treasury. In 2014, the body was recovered to optimize the management of the Public Treasury and specially to the Autonomous Liquidity Fund.

== Organization chart ==
From the DGT depends:

- The Deputy Directorate-General for the Treasury, is the body responsible for the day-to-day management of all the matters related to the Public Treasury including those related to the contributions made by the Spanish administrations to the European Union.
- The Deputy Directorate-General for Credit Institutions Law, Banking and Payment Services, is the body responsible for the management of the government policy on financial institutions and stock markets. It also supervises the compiling of the objectives established for the SAREB.
- The Deputy Directorate-General for Securities Market Law and Financial Instruments, that it has the same powers that the Deputy Directorate-General for Credit Institutions Law, Banking and Payment Services but focused on financial institutions which their main objective is to offer mortgage loan, credit, guarantee and appraisal services, as well as protecting the users of this services.
- The Deputy Directorate-General for the Inspection and Control of Capital Movements, that assumes the powers of investigation and inspection to prevent and correct infractions about capital movements. It is also the body responsible for blocking, freezing or immobilization of economic resources and others concerning transfers of funds, derived from financial sanctions and restrictive measures approved by the European Union or national authorities.
- The Deputy Directorate-General for Financing and Management of Public Debt, responsible for executing the government policy on state indebtedness and controlling the debt level of regions and local administrations.

== Budget ==
The Directorate-General's Budget is assigned through the General Secretariat. Specifically, for 2023 the DGT has a budget of €582.9 million through three programs:

2023 Budget of the Directorate-General for the Treasury
No. Program	Program	Amount	Ref.
923O	State Debt and Treasury Management	€63,103,430	
923P	Relations with Multilateral Financial Institutions	€519,834,660	
Directorate-General' Budget		€582,938,090	
