= Pilar de Vicente-Gella =

Spanish writer and ballerina dancer

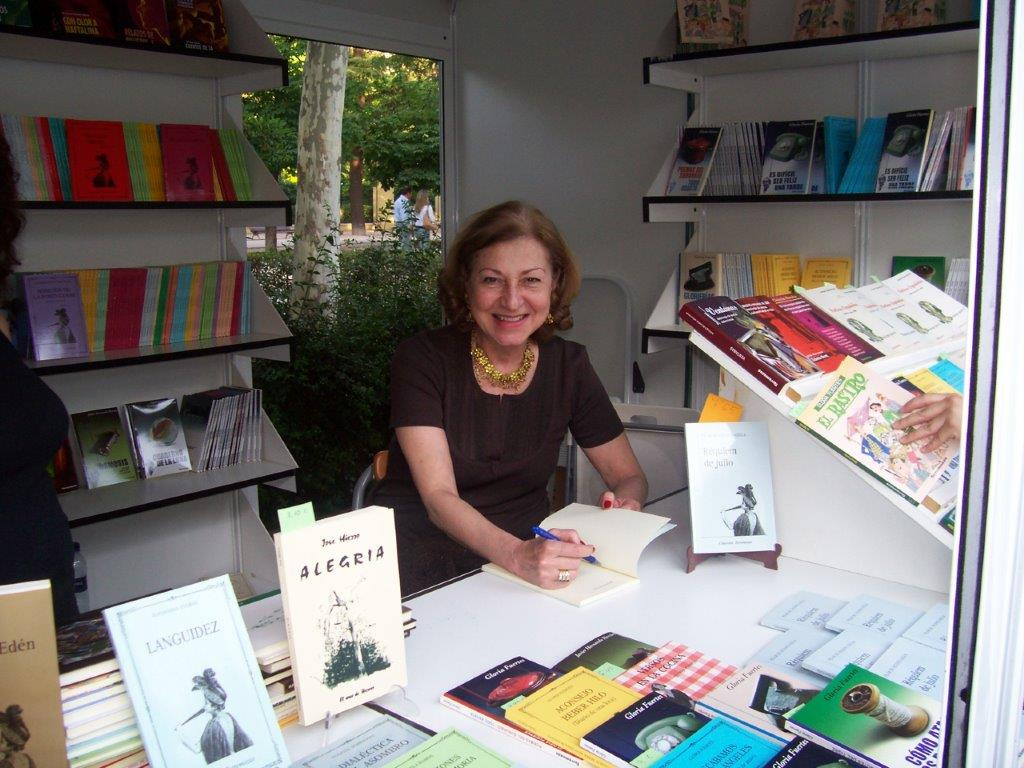
- Pilar de Vicente-Gella, at the 2007 Retiro park book fair of Madrid, 2007
- Born: Maria Pilar Esther de Vicente-Gella Capo; 23 April 1942; Zaragoza, Spain
- Died: 30 April 2016 (aged 74); Madrid, Spain
- Occupations: Writer; Ballerina
- Spouse: Fausto Navarro Izquierdo (m. 1969)
- Writing career
- Period: 1967/68 in ballet, 1981–2016 in literature
- Genres: Poetry; Fiction; Aphorisms
- Notable works: The Man With White Slacks; On the Banks of the Yamuna; Tornaviaje (Return); A contratiempo" (A Setback Against the Tide)
- Notable awards: Poetry contest of the La Solana (province of Ciudad Real) Town hall, 1994, Nicolas del Hierro poetry awards, Piedrabuena (Ciudad Real), 1997, Second at the 1997 Puente de Ventas literary contest, Madrid 1997

Pilar de Vicente-Gella (born María Pilar Esther de Vicente-Gella Capo; 23 April 1942 – 30 April 2016) was a Spanish writer and ballerina. Pilu, as relatives and friends knew her, had a vocation for both arts since she was very young.

== Biography ==
Born in Zaragoza at 6:10 a.m. of 23 April 1942, in a fairly well-off family of lawyers with liberal ideas, she was Maria Pilar Capo Bonnafous's and Agustin Vicente Gella's youngest daughter. Her father, a state lawyer and commercial law professor at the University of Zaragoza's Law Faculty, served as the faculty's deputy dean from 1949 to 1962. He then served as dean from 31 December 1962 to 31 December 1968 and, finally, from 1972 to 1974 as rector of the University of Zaragoza.

Her godfather was Fausto Vicente Gella, her father's brother and Counsel of State Council. Her paternal grandfather, Agustin Vicente Perez, served as Mayor of Teruel and her maternal grandfather, Juan Capo, was a highly ranked official of the Bank of Spain. Her father's family came from Teruel and her mother's from Mallorca. Her parents inspired her with their passion for art, particularly so for music. Her mother played piano and her father was passionate about opera. Likewise, she always lived surrounded by paintings, so she also adored this field of art. On a different note, she was always proud of being born on 23 April, date of Miguel de Cervantes's and William Shakespeare's death (1616), the book day and currently regional day of Aragon, on the festivity of St. George.

She spent most of her childhood between 23, Paseo de la Independencia, in Zaragoza and Teruel, but with occasional trips to Madrid, Barcelona, Paris or Milan, sometimes to attend opera shows in theatres such as Barcelona's Teatro del Liceo or Milan's Alla Scala. During her infancy, she endured a long disease, which was the start of a fragile health during most of her life.

During the 60s she lived in Paris, Cannes and Montecarlo. In May 1968, she met Spanish diplomat Fausto Navarro Izquierdo, who also came from Aragon, although born in San Salvador, posted to Paris. On 3 July 1969, they married in Zaragoza and, after spending their honeymoon in the Mediterranean and the Black Sea, moved to Paris. On 26 February 1971, her elder son was born in Neuilly-Sur-Seine. After her husband's posting to Paris came to an end, they lived in Madrid for one year. In 1974, Fausto was posted as Spain's general consul to Liverpool, where her youngest son was born. In 1978, they moved to New Delhi. India deeply amazed Pilar de Vicente-Gella. In 1980, Fausto was posted as Spanish ambassador to Abu Dhabi.

In 1982, she started the procedure to separate from her husband. In doing so, she decided to move to Madrid for a new start.

On 20 January 1984 her father died, which was particularly painful for her as she considered her father to have been the person who had loved her the most in her entire life. During the following years, she lost a few more dear members of her family. On 17 July 1993, her mother died.

Shortly after moving to Madrid, she started meeting the literary community of the Spanish capital. She met many artists, especially poets who lived in the capital, such as, among others, her friends Jesus Hilario Tundidor and Claudio Rodriguez, both poets from Zamora, Antonio Gonzalez Guerrero, poet from the province of Leon, and Rafael Soto Verges, yet another poet from Cadiz. She shared with all of them long evenings of literary and philosophical chats, reading one another their latest poetic compositions.

In the early 2000s her health started to seriously deteriorate.

On 7 October 2011, her first granddaughter was born and on 10 October 2013, her second was born.

On 30 April 2016, Pilar de Vicente-Gella died in her flat, in Madrid, surrounded by her paintings, books and opera DVD's. Her funeral service was delivered at the Royal Chapel of St. Anthony of Florida, in her neighbourhood of Madrid, on 6 May 2016. Since 9 May 2016, an urn with her remains rests in her father's niche, in Teruel's municipal cemetery.

== Pilar de Vicente-Gella, the ballerina ==
Although she started writing during her childhood, Pilar de Vicente-Gella's artistic passion materialized mainly through classical ballet. She started practicing in Zaragoza, in María de Ávila's school. However, it was in France where she sharpened her technique, taking lessons from a true Vaganova method Russian teacher. This allowed her to join the Opéra de Monte-Carlo's Ballet Company during the 1967/68 season, where she even shared the stage with the great Rudolf Nureyev. Yet, when she was starting to develop a professional ballet career, she chose to quit in favour of her marriage.

When she returned to Spain, she taught at Spain's Performing Arts National Institute-Spanish National Ballet, starting on 1 December 1983, at that time, under the direction of Maria de Avila. Following some differences between her vision and that of the National Ballet's leadership, she was no longer assigned any pupils after a few years.

== Pilar de Vicente-Gella, the writer ==
=== Beginnings, until 1985 ===
Pilar de Vicente-Gella started writing during her childhood. She recalled having been runner-up in a literature contest at the age of 14.

During her two-year stay in New Delhi, from 1978 to 1980, she published a few articles, reports and chronicles about India's culture and social relations for the Heraldo de Aragón newspaper. She also published several tales for this newspaper.

It was this regional newspaper which released her first book: El Transplante y Otras Narraciones para Casi Adultos (The Transplant and Other Narrations for Almost Adults), in 1981. She dedicated it to her husband and to her children and her father wrote several pages As a Preface.

After this first book, she wrote The Man with White Slacks in English. The book was published in the United States in 1985, with Vantage Press. Even though, up to that point, both of her released books were written in prose, the second one might be considered a transition towards her most active period, in which she focused on poetry, since The Man with White Slacks prose is more poetic than the short stories in The Transplant. She dedicated the edition to the memory of the man who showed her the way to love butterflies, her father.

=== Most productive period in poetry: 1987–2000 ===
From 1985 on, Pilar de Vicente-Gella focused on poetry. Her first published book of poems was La Eterna Prometida (The Eternal Bride), in 1987, in the Acuario poetry collection of Andromeda Editions, which was led at that time by Leoncio Garcia-Jimenez, who also wrote its preface. The Eternal Bride's vision was to describe death as something longed for without fear, as a bride, sister, mother or lover, which makes us all equal and enables us to reach peace. It was dedicated to her mother.

The same year, Pilar de Vicente-Gella was selected to be included in the Voces Nuevas (New Voices) publication, by Torremozas editions, under the leadership of Luz Maria Jimenez Faro. Four poems were included in the book: Can you imagine? (¿Te imaginas?), Incandescent Flight (Huida incandescente), And Came the Knights (Y los jinetes llegaron) and With Ten Pigeons Did He Come (Con diez palomas vino). It was the first collaboration between the poet and the editor. They would work together several times until they both died, only about a year apart.

Two years later, she released in Bilbao A Través de mi Noche (Through My Night), with the Editorial Projection Studio.

In 1990, Pilar de Vicente-Gella released "Cuarto Creciente" (Waxing Crescent), in the Tagore poetry collection, from Andromeda Editions, a collection led, once again, by Leoncio Garcia-Jimenez. This work is a lovers' dialogue in a garden of Al-Andalus, the Moorish Spain. For this poetic composition, the author researched and used a significant number of Spanish words with Arabic origin. The edition includes a couple of pages by Palestinian poet Mahmud Sobh "as a way of preface". She dedicates it to the memory of her uncle Fausto Vicente Gella, "Poet in Madrid's institutions" ("poeta del foro"). The book was presented on 6 June 1990, in Madrid's National Library, including Leoncio Garcia-Jimenez, Mahmud Sobh and poet and philologist Antonio Gonzalez Guerrero as participants.

In 1990 and 1991, Pilar de Vicente-Gella was awarded "spike" and "bakery", respectively, in the "Wheat Bread" poetry awards of La Solana, province of Ciudad Real.

In 1993, she published A orillas del Yamuna -On the Banks of the Yamuna- in New Delhi, even though she actually wrote it before The Eternal Bride. In this work, she expresses her fascination for India and especially for its capital city. She wrote it in Spanish and it was released in a Spanish-English bilingual edition. It was translated by Professor of Spanish, Shyama Prasad Ganguly, director and editor of the Indian Journal of Spanish & Latin American Studies. He also wrote the preface.

In 1994, Pilar de Vicente-Gella won the poetry contest of the La Solana (province of Ciudad Real) Town hall.

In 1995, Pilar de Vicente-Gella published "La Casa Abandonada" (The Forsaken House), with, Ed. Torremozas. In this work, the author describes her feelings when she had to pack all her parents belongings and evict the apartment in 23 Paseo de la Independencia, in Zaragoza, after the passing of her mother, in July 1993.

In 1997, she won the "Nicolas del Hierro" poetry awards, by the Piedrabuena Town hall, in the province of Ciudad Real, with her book, "Si por mi Nombre Alguna Vez me Llamas" (If by My Name You Ever Call Me). The panel included Joaquin Benito de Lucas, Pedro Antonio Gonzalez Moreno, Francisco Caro Sierra and Nicolas del Hierro. Mercedes Navas Laguna served as secretary of the panel. She dedicated it to her friend and professor of art history Juan Jose Junquera.

Almost simultaneously, she won the second award in the 1997 Puente de Ventas contest with her novel "Por Amor a Wolfgang Amadeus" (For love to Wolfgang Amadeus), a narration about a divorced nurse with a sick mother, a daughter studying in London, a friendly neighbour and a lover ten years younger than her. She lives at the Donostiarra Avenue, in the Ventas del Espíritu Santo neighbourhood, likes visiting the Eva Perón park and the Fuente del Berro fountain, as well as shopping at the Canillas Marketplace. However, she is now responsible for taking care of her mother and she shares her joys and hardships with Mozart. She dedicated this book to her children.

The panel included Enrique de Aguinaga as chair; Luis Prados de la Plaza, Angel del Rio, Rafael Simancas, Manuel Lindo, Angel Sagredo, Juan Van-Halen, Javier Delgado, Pedro Calvo Hernando, Jose Fradejas, Valentina Gomez Mampaso and Lorenzo Lopez Sancho as members; and Vicente Diez Zazo as secretary.

In 2000, the government of the Province of Zaragoza published "En el Fragil Costado de la Infancia" (In Childhood's Fragile Side Stand). Poet Rafael Soto Verges wrote the preface for her. She dedicated it to Rosa Maria Aranda, who had also published poetry, and to Aranda's daughter, a fellow dancer in Monte Carlo in the 60s.

Apart from the books that were published, during this period, she wrote many unpublished works such as, "Volver al Yamuna" (Back to the Yamuna) in poetry, and, in prose, "La Niña Azul" (The Blue Girl), about her childhood memories, or "El Rapto" (The Kidknap).

=== Least active period: 2000–2014 ===
After 2000, her literary work progressively lost momentum, as her health also deteriorated. On 23 April 2003, Pilar de Vicente-Gella participated in Arco Poetico, hosted by Jesus de la Peña. She took about six years to prepare her following published book, "Requiem de Julio" (Requiem of July), released by the Torremozas collection in 2006. The main feature of this work is its duality between, on the one hand, the grievance brought about by the death of her friend, poet from Zamora Claudio Rodriguez, in 1999, and, on the other, the mixed feelings coming from finding a close friend from the 80s in Abu Dhabi again, two different things that occurred simultaneously. She dedicated the book to the poet and to his widow. However, this volume brought to her much unrest since she heard rumours indicating that many readers, including the poets widow herself, misunderstood completely the duality in the book. As a consequence, it took her about eight years to find the necessary motivation to write again.

=== Final stand: 2014–2016 ===
In March 2015, she published "Tornaviaje" (Return) with the Torremozas collection. She dedicated it to her late elder brother, Agustin, to whom she had been very attached during her childhood. "Tornaviaje" also describes how the author managed to get over the sadness that the misunderstandings about her previous book had caused her. It was the last book that Luz Maria Jiménez Faro sent to press and the first that was actually released after her death. The passing away of her mother's best friend, Enriqueta Castejon, led Pilar de Vicente-Gella to resume writing and return to square one. In fact, the original title in Spanish, "Tornaviaje" comes from explorer Andrés de Urdaneta, known for discovering and documenting the Pacific Ocean route between the Philippines and Acapulco, known as the Urdaneta route or Tornaviaje, in Spanish. In a way, it means coming back to the starting point but through a different and enlightening route. In December 2015, she published "A Contratiempo" (A Setback Against The Tide), with Torremozas, her last book and the first one in a new literary genre: aphorisms. She dedicated it to her two granddaughters, whom she nicknamed Michmich and Bibich, apricot and fawn in Arabic. It was composed as a compendium of her life philosophy which, at the same time, she hoped would guide her granddaughters through their teenage years in the future.

On 30 April 2016, she died in her residence in Madrid, while she was working on a second volume of "A Contratiempo".

== List of works ==
=== Prose ===
- "El Transplante y Otras Narraciones para Casi Adultos" (The Transplant and Other Narrations for Almost Adults). Zaragoza, Ed. Heraldo de Aragón, 1981.
- The Man With White Slacks, New York, Vantage Press, 1985.
- "Por amor a Wolfgang Amadeus" (For love to Wolfgang Amadeus). Madrid, Ed. Grupo G., Second at the 1997 Puente de Ventas novels contest, 1998.

=== Poetry ===
- "La Eterna Prometida" (The Eternal Bride). Madrid, Ed. Andrómeda, 1987.
- "A Través de mi Noche" (Through my Night), Bilbao, Estudio de Proyección Editorial, 1989.
- "Cuarto creciente" (Waxing Crescent). Madrid, Ed. Andrómeda, 1990.
- "A Orillas del Yamuna" – On the Banks Of The Yamuna- bilingual version English/Spanish, New Delhi, Wiley Eastern Limited, 1993.
- "La Casa Abandonada" (The Forsaken House), Madrid, Ed. Torremozas, 1995.
- "Si por mi Nombre Alguna vez me Llamas" (If By My Name You Ever Call Me), Piedrabuena (Ciudad Real), Colección Yedra, “Nicolás del Hierro” poetry contest, 1997.
- "En el Frágil Costado de la Infancia" (Childhood's Fragile Side Stand), Zaragoza, Excma. Diputación de Zaragoza, 2000.
- "Requiem de Julio" (Requiem of July), Madrid, Editorial Torremozas, 2006.
- "Tornaviaje" (Return,) Madrid, Editorial Torremozas, 2015.

=== Aphorisms ===
- "A contratiempo" (A Setback Against the Tide), Madrid, Torremozas, 2015.

== Literary awards ==
- "spike" in the first "Wheat Bread" poetry awards of La Solana, province of Ciudad Real, 1990.
- "bakery" in the second "Wheat Bread" poetry awards of La Solana, province of Ciudad Real, 1991.
- Poetry contest of the La Solana (province of Ciudad Real) Town hall, 1994.
- Nicolas del Hierro poetry awards, Piedrabuena (Ciudad Real), 1997.
- Second place at the 1997 Puente de Ventas novels contest, Madrid 1997.
