= José de Salamanca, Marquess of Salamanca =

Spanish businessman and politician (1811–1883)

The Most Excellent The Marquess of Salamanca GE
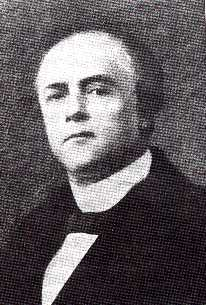
- Full name: José María de Salamanca y Mayol
- Born: 23 May 1811; Málaga, Spain
- Died: 21 January 1883 (aged 71); Carabanchel Bajo, Spain
- Spouse: Petronila Livermore y Salas

José de Salamanca y Mayol, 1st Marquess of Salamanca, 1st Count of Llanos, GE (23 May 1811 – 21 January 1883) was a Spanish businessman and politician. He served as Finance Minister of Spain and briefly as de facto prime minister in 1847.

Prominent during the reign of Isabella II, he was responsible for an extension to the city of Madrid; the Salamanca neighborhood of that city now bears his name. He had an adventurous life with many ups and downs, being Spain’s wealthiest man during a significant period of his life and one of the largest fortunes in the world at one point. His prominent associates included Maria Christina of the Two Sicilies, queen mother and regent for the young Queen Isabella. As a businessman, he undertook many projects that shaped modern Spain: railways, construction of entire neighborhoods, banking and investments; at the same time, he was associated with no small amount of political and corporate corruption.

== Youth, student and mayor ==
Salamanca studied philosophy and law at the Colegio de San Bartolomé y Santiago in Granada, finishing his studies in 1828. It was probably in Granada that he first met groups opposed to the absolutist regime of Ferdinand VII, including Mariana Pineda, who became a martyr for the Spanish liberals when she was tried and condemned to death in 1831.

Shortly after his return to his native Málaga, the liberal general José María Torrijos was detained for an attempted coup. Salamanca was probably involved in the coup; he went to Madrid in an unsuccessful attempt to seek a royal pardon for Torrijos. His revolutionary ardor was calmed for a time and, thanks to his father's friendship with Francisco Cea Bermúdez, the President of the Council of Ministers (effectively, prime minister), he was made mayor of Monòver, (province of Alicante) in 1833.

That year Ferdinand VII died, bringing to power his wife, Maria Christina, as regent for the three-year-old queen Isabella II. The revolutionary movements of the regency era first propelled the future marquess onto the national scene. In 1835 he was named mayor of Vera (province of Almería); while there he married Petronila Livermore y Salas. After serving as mayor of Vera, he was chosen to represent the province of Almería in the Revolutionary Government at Seville.

In 1837 the Mutiny of La Granja de San Ildefonso forced Maria Christina to restore the liberal Constitution of 1812, which was elaborated into the new Progressive Constitution of 1837. Salamanca was elected deputy for Málaga in the new Cortes, which brought him to the capital, Madrid to serve in this office.

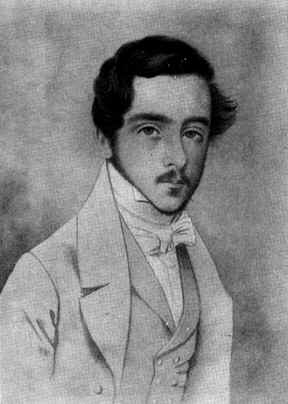
Portrait of the young José de Salamanca.

== Deputy, minister, and exile ==
Once in Madrid, Salamanca developed a great inclination toward business, which would bring him both great successes and great difficulties. After serving briefly as a judge in a Madrid court of first instance, in 1839 he obtained the official monopoly on salt, and began also to invest in the Bolsa de Madrid (Madrid Stock Exchange). He became a prominent figure in the highest circles of Madrid society. Among his associates over the next few years were Nazario Carriquiri, the Marquess of Marismas del Guadalquivir, Gaspar Remisa, José Buschenthal, Agustín Muñoz and the Rothschilds' agents in Madrid, Daniel Weisweiller and Ignacio Bauer. His possession of the salt monopoly, however, gained him the enmity, for the time, of General Ramón María Narváez.

As well as achieving such prominence (if not always honor and success) in business, his political star was also on the rise. On 28 March 1847 he was named Finance Minister of Spain in the government of Joaquín Francisco Pacheco; when the government fell in October of that year, he was briefly the de facto president of the Council of Ministers (that is, effectively, de facto prime minister), but was displaced by Florencio García Goyena, as parliament began investigating the alleged financial irregularities of his ministry.

Salamanca had been saved from his own disastrous stock speculations when Francisco Serrano Domínguez convinced Isabella II to make him Minister of Finance. Queen Isabella soon sacked the entire council of ministers, establishing a new government under General Narváez, the third time in four years that Narváez had been president of the Council of Ministers. As Salamanca's favors to his friends became public knowledge, he consorted with various generals who were plotting to overthrow the government. Narváez's solidification of power sent Salamanca into exile in France, where he remained until 1849.

Five years later, he was in exile again, characterized as a bestia negra ("black beast") by the new Progressive government that swept to power in June and July 1854 on the wings of unrest, ending the década moderada and beginning the bienio progresista.

There had existed until the celebrated 28 June [1854] a limited partnership for the exploitation of all agios [discrepancies in exchange rates], of all the business affairs for which the country had to pay with its blood. Captained by [Maria] Christina and her manager Salamanca, monster of immorality; she was, as the vulgar like to say, his figurehead. To introduce themselves into the Spanish railway business and to pounce upon it like a pack of hungry wolves was a thing no one admired, because it was not admirable.

— La Ilustración (newspaper), 24 July 1854, at the outset of the bienio progresista, after Salamanca had gone into exile.

Long before the end of the bienio progresista Salamanca was back in Spain, and in 1856 when Moderates regained power, Salamanca returned to favor and was given the title of senator for life.

== Businessman ==
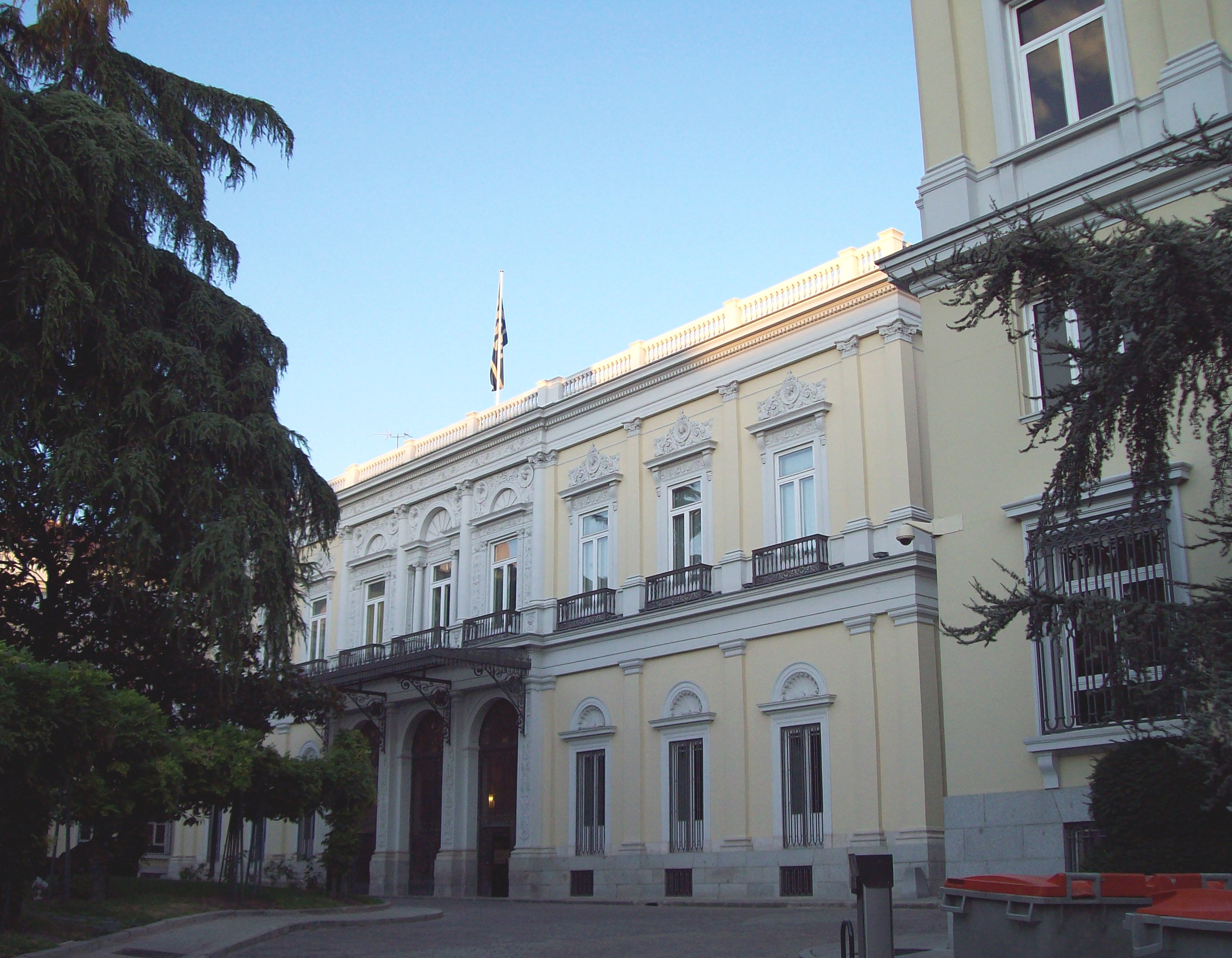
Salamanca's palace in Madrid, built in 1855

During the 42 years of his life that Salamanca spent in Madrid, Salamanca had a major career as a financier and businessman. It is for this that he is most remembered. He was a founder of the Bank of Isabella II (1844) and the Bank de Cádiz (1846) Upon returning from his first exile he earned close to 300 million reales by renting out the state salt monopoly for five years. This amount was twice what he had earned since obtaining this monopoly. Not for the first time, he restored his relations with Narváez. Narváez and Agustín Fernando Muñoz, Duke of Riánsares (second husband of the queen mother Maria Christina) came to be his partners in a number of subsequent business ventures.

Salamanca was credited with development of the neighborhood of Madrid that was named for him. This was the first phase of the expansion of Madrid proposed by Carlos María de Castro.. One of his last business ventures was a similar expansion of San Sebastián in 1881.

=== Railways ===
Salamanca also invested in railways, beginning the construction of the line from Madrid to Aranjuez. On 24 December 1845 the Sociedad del Ferrocarril de Madrid a Aranjuez (Madrid-Aranjuez Railway Company) was established with a capital of 45 million reales. This time his partners were the banker Nazario Carriquiri and the Count of Retamoso, Maria Christina's brother-in-law.

The construction of the line caused Salamanca some economic difficulties, and coincided with the financial crisis of 1846, not to mention Salamanca's failure at the Bank of Isabella II and a fall from grace that sent him into exile in France for 16 months. The line was successfully completed and began service on 7 February 1851. Queen Isabella II presided over the opening of the line and more than a thousand invitees enjoyed a generous party at Salamanca's personal expense. Three months later, the line was bringing in 50,000 reales every day. On 13 August 1852, Salamanca sold the line to the state for 60.2 million reales, then rented it back for 1,500,000 reales a year.

Today, that route is part of the line from Madrid to Alcázar de San Juan, where it divides into a route to Andalusia and one to the Spanish Levante. A Sunday tourist train, the Tren de la Fresa ("Strawberry Train") keeps alive the nickname earned by the Madrid-Aranjuez line in its early years. The present-day Aranjuez station is located at a small distance from the original terminus immediately at the Royal Palace of Aranjuez.

Salamanca also invested in railways from Madrid to Irún, Córdoba to Málaga, and from Aranjuez to the Mediterranean; his investments were not limited to Spain. They extended throughout Europe and the Americas, including the Atlantic and Great Western Railroad in New York State, Pennsylvania, and Ohio: hence the name of the small city of Salamanca in western New York and its surrounding township.

=== Panic at the Bolsa de Madrid ===
In autumn 1844, the Bolsa de Madrid—Spain's largest stock exchange—saw a series of enthusiastic sessions. Optimism reigned at the stability provided by the government of Narvaez. However, after several days of analysis, Salamanca began to sell short in a seemingly clumsy strategy.

Taking advantage of his privileged position in public affairs, Salamanca knew that several generals were considering a coup. He also knew that Narváez was maintaining a correspondence with some of them, intending to get them to drop the plan.

When the news arrived that General Martín Zurbano had risen up in rebellion in Nájera, Salamanca and his associates announced it to sow panic. The stock exchange, sensitive to any abrupt change in public affairs, plummeted, and Salamanca profited by some 30 million reales in a single day. Fernando Muñoz and General Narváez each received 2 million.

It is very "salty", and although I was much enraged, I am weak, I want ... but do not say it because then I come to propose a business where we're going to give Spain many millions.

— General Narváez

Where the law has most failed is on the routes that have been granted to Señor Salamanca, and the reason is because this man is associated with a powerful man who has too much and too fatal an influence on the matter.

— General Manuel Gutiérrez de la Concha, Marquess del Duero (Progressive), in the Spanish Senate, referring to Salamanca's friendship with Fernando Muñoz, the queen's step-father-in-law.

=== Failed Bank of Isabella II ===
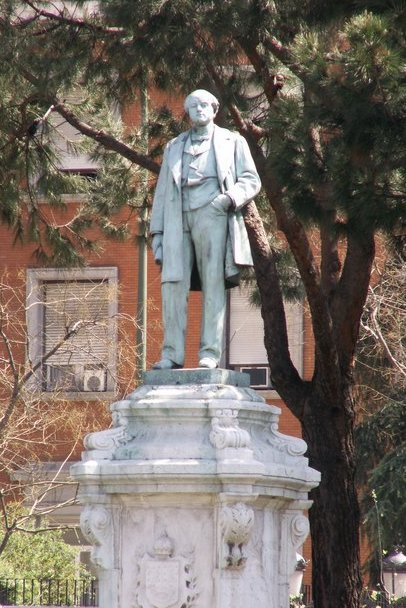
Statue of the Marquess of Salamanca in the Madrid plaza that bears his name

Founded in 1844, it was to be an institution more or less on a par with the Bank of San Fernando. It was founded with capital of 100 million reales, which it distributed generously as credit among Spain's emerging capitalist investors.

Although the bank was never a financial success, Salamanca used its capital to make purchases, such as 71-block lot purchased from María Luisa de Borbón, paid for with a check for 1 million reales drawn on the bank. When the time came that the check had to be made good, Salamanca turned to Queen Isabella, who owed money to the bank. However, she insisted on paying the debt with her shares in the Madrid-Aranjuez railway, shares for which she had paid 4 million reales, but which were by this time practically worthless.

The bank was ultimately rescued by being merged into the Bank of San Fernando, forming the basis for the Bank of Spain.

== Financial decline ==
From 1860 onward, Salamanca's career began to decline due to a series of unsuccessful undertakings. He was already far past his financial prime when the queen named him Marquess of Salamanca in 1863 and Count of los Llanos in 1864; the latter title made him a Grandee of Spain. Not long after this he was forced to sell his Madrid palace, one of the most elegant and best built of the era. The building at what is now Paseo de Recoletos n.º 10 is owned today by the Banco Bilbao Vizcaya Argentaria and is used for art exhibitions.

However, he was not without other palaces. He owned the Palacio de Vista Alegre in Carabanchel Bajo, the Palacio de Buena Esperanza en Carabanchel Alto, and another in Aranjuez. He also owned extensive land in Los Llanos, the Palacio de Mitra in Lisbon, a hôtel particulier in Paris, and he rented a palace in Rome, each with an army of servants.

After the Sexenio Democrático (the years 1868–1874, including the years of the First Spanish Republic), in 1879 he won the right to build the Canal del Duero to bring potable water to Valladolid, which did not succeed in restoring his fortune.

He died at Carabanchel Bajo in 1883, 6 million reales in debt. In the course of a life of luxury and sybaritic extremes, José de Salamanca had been a lawyer, conspirator, mayor, judge, banker, underwriter of public works, theatrical impresario, director of businesses, engineer, agriculturalist, livestock rancher, government minister, senator, deputy, marquess, count, and Grandee of Spain.

== Legacy ==
There are streets named after Salamanca in Talayuela, Navalmoral de la Mata, Torremolinos, and Castellón de la Plana. In San Sebastián there is a street called the Paseo de Salamanca in his honor. In Madrid, a neighborhood and a plaza bear his name. The plaza was designed by municipal architect Pablo Aranda, who also designed the pedestal for his statue in the plaza. Salamanca in Western New York and its surrounding township were named after him.

El marqués de Salamanca ("The Marquis of Salamanca") is a 1948 Spanish biopic about him. The marquis is played by Alfredo Mayo.
