= Marquess of Salamanca =

Dukedom of Spain

Marquessate of Salamanca
- Creation date: 9 October 1863
- Created by: Isabella II
- Peerage: Peerage of Spain
- First holder: José de Salamanca y Mayol, 1st Marquess of Salamanca
- Present holder: Vacant
- Heir apparent: Isabella Monteiro de Carvalho y Sales

Marquess of Salamanca (Spanish: Marqués de Salamanca) is a hereditary title in the Peerage of Spain, granted in 1863 by Isabella II to José de Salamanca y Mayol, 1st Count of Llanos, Minister of Finance, railway, banking, and real estate tycoon, and one of the world's wealthiest people during the reign of Isabella II.

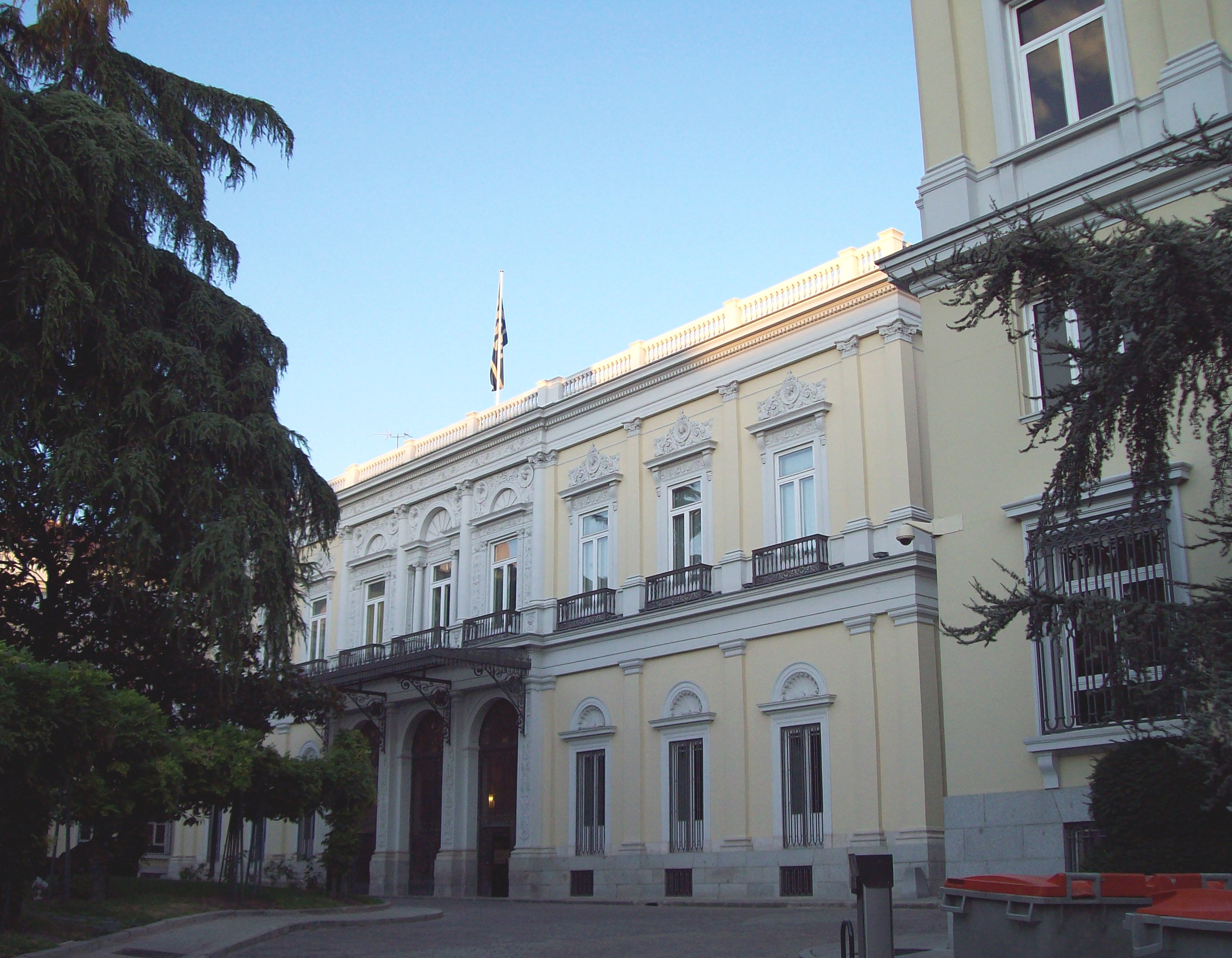
Palace of the Marquesses of Salamanca in Madrid

== Marquesses of Salamanca (1863) ==
- José de Salamanca y Mayol, 1st Marquess of Salamanca (1811–1883)
- Fernando de Salamanca y Livermore, 2nd Marquess of Salamanca (1836–1904)
- Luis de Salamanca y Hurtado de Zaldívar, 3rd Marquess of Salamanca (1884–1954)
- Carlos de Salamanca y Hurtado de Zaldívar, 4th Marquess of Salamanca (1887–1975)
- María de Salamanca y Caro, 5th Marchioness of Salamanca (1920–2004)
- Olavio Egidio Monteiro de Carvalho y Salamanca, 6th Marquess of Salamanca (1941–2022)

== See also ==
- Barrio de Salamanca
