= Valentín Estrada =

- Born: Valentín Estrada Domínguez; 1901; El Salvador
- Died: 1987 (aged 85–86); Soyapango, El Salvador
- Known for: Sculpture
- Notable work: Atlácatl; La Diosa Minerva; Obelisco y Medallón del Parque Balboa; Obelisco de Los Próceres

Valentin Estrada Domínguez (1902 – Soyapango, 1987) was a Salvadoran sculptor. He was considered the national sculptor by the government of El Salvador "because the majority of his work was erected in popular sites, accessible to the people and is the only one who has made sculpture into a way of preserving idiosyncrasy and customs."

== Biography ==
Valentín Estrada Domínguez was the son of Gabriel Estrada and Olivia Galvez. He had eleven children among whom Rodolfo Estrada stands out for continuing his father's legacy.

Estrada was a student in the Escuela de Escultura Yela Gunther in Guatemala. Between the years 1918 and 1920 he studied in the Real Academia de Bellas Artes de San Fernando in Madrid, Spain, and from 1920 to 1928 he was a student of sculpture and bronze smelting in a workshop of the La Guindalera barrio in Madrid.

In the year 1972, he received the Medal of Diego de Holguín from the Mayor of San Salvador.

His works are composed of approximately 250 sculptures, the majority of which are sculpted in stone. Among the most important are the statue of Atlácatl, forged in bronze, seven busts of stone and bronze of Salvadoran personalities, The Goddess Minerva, the Obelisk and Medallion in the Parque Balboa and the Obelisk of the Founders.

He died in the City of Soyapango in the year 1987 in conditions of extreme poverty. In 1996, the Abril Uno editorial published a biographical book titled "Yo Atlacatl, Valentín Estrada Memorias de Un Escultor", redacted by the plastic artist Armando Solís.
