= Recoletos (Madrid) =

Coordinates: 40°25′27″N 3°41′11″W

- Ward of Madrid
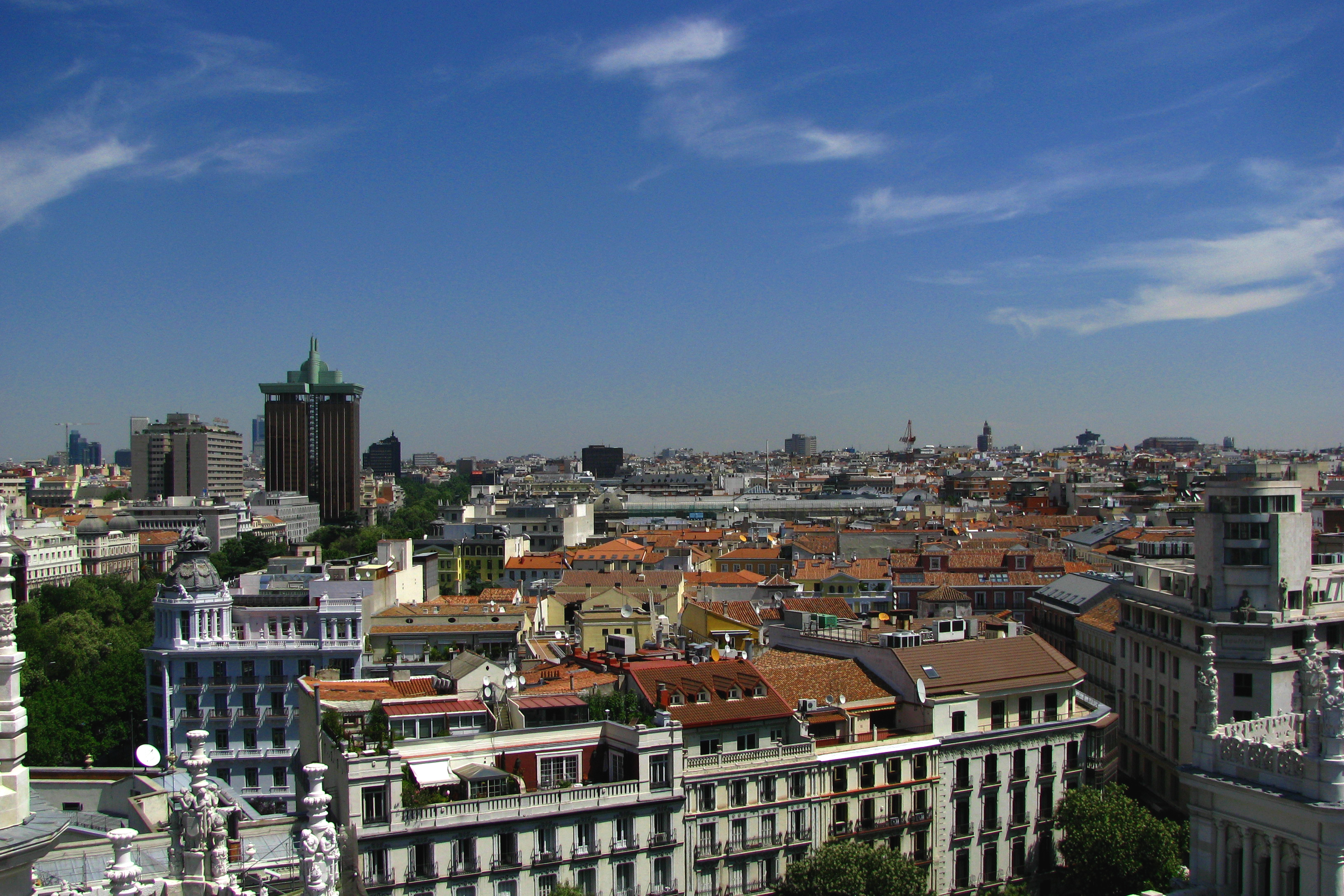
- Country: Spain
- Autonomous community: Madrid
- Municipality: Madrid
- District: Salamanca

Recoletos is one of the six wards (barrios) of Salamanca in Madrid, Spain.

== Places of interest ==
- National Archaeological Museum of Spain
- Biblioteca Nacional de España
