= Bank of Spain Building =

Historic building in Madrid, Spain

Bank of Spain
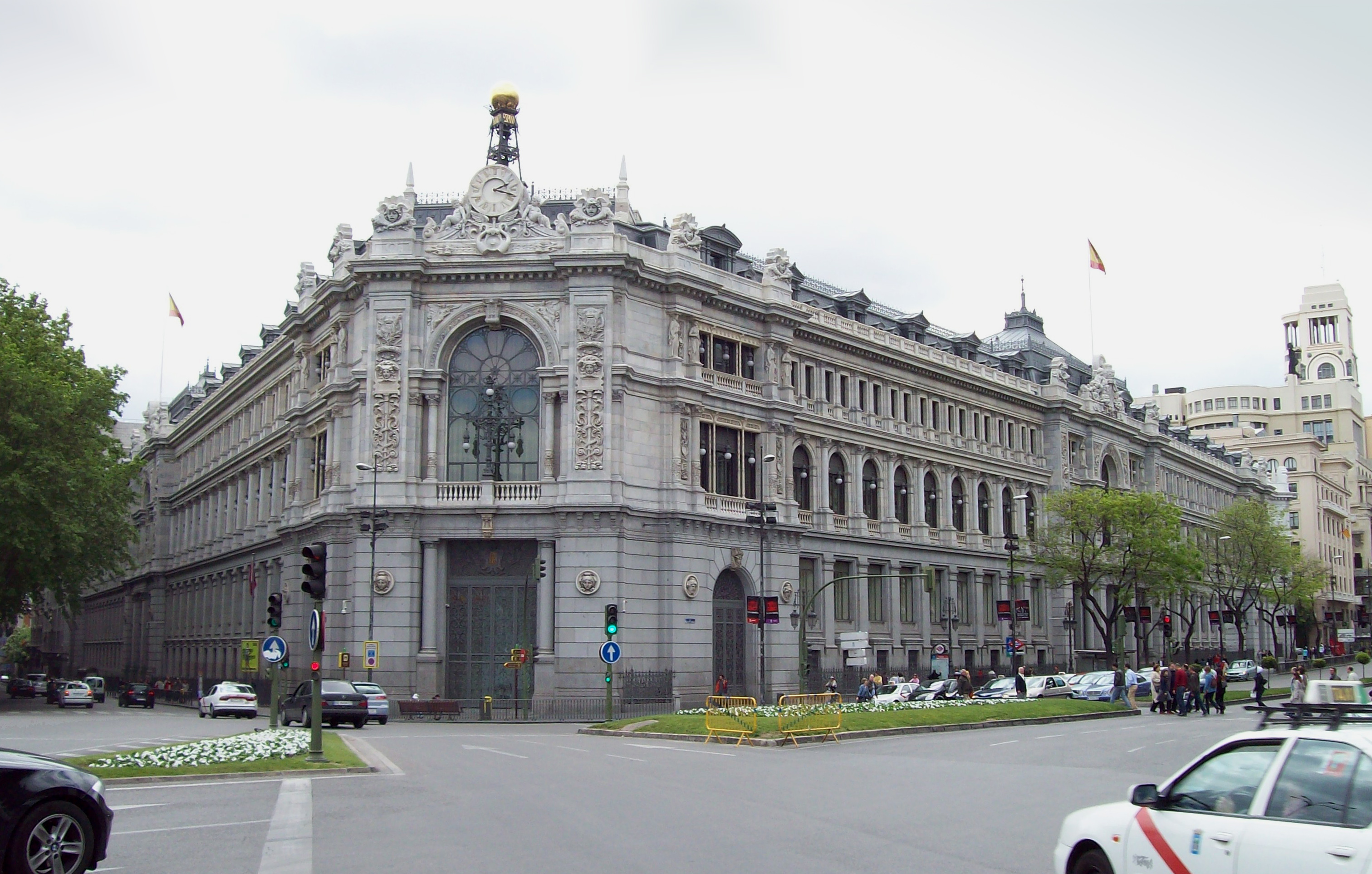

General information
- Location: Calle de Alcalá 48, Madrid, Spain
- Coordinates: 40°25′7.4″N 3°41′39.5″W
- Construction started: 4 July 1884
- Opening: 3 March 1891

The Bank of Spain Building (Spanish: edificio del Banco de España) is the main headquarters of the Bank of Spain. Located in Madrid, it lies at the crossing of the Calle de Alcalá and the Paseo del Prado.

== History ==
Works started on 4 July 1884, following a project by Eduardo Adaro and Severiano Sáinz de la Lastra.

Finished by 1891, the building was inaugurated on 3 March 1891.

The building endured a first enlargement process between 1932 and 1936. Further renovations were finished in 1969 and 2006.

In December 1999, the building was declared Property of Cultural Interest, under the Monument descriptor.

The building houses 280 tonnes of the Spanish gold reserve. This gold reserve is protected by a complex mechanism and is placed 37 meters underground. The security system includes three armored doors, a trench with a one-person wide bridge, and a water-flooding system that uses the water from two adjacent rivers that go below the Cibeles fountain, located next to the bank's building.

The building was to be used as a film location for the third season of the Spanish series Money Heist, but due to this security system, it was decided to be filmed in the Spanish Ministry of Development.
