= Bank of Isabella II =

The Bank of Isabella II (Spanish: Banco de Isabel II) was a financial institution in Spain, created by a Royal Decree of 25 January 1844 as a bank that, together with the Bank of San Fernando, began the process of establishing a Spanish banking apparatus adequate for industrialization and the transformation from feudalism to capitalism. Although not officially a bank of issue, it issued bonds that "were banknotes in all but name." In theory it was an equal competitor to the Bank of San Fernando. In practice it focused in the private sector, as a bank for industry.

Among the main founders of the bank were José de Salamanca, Nazario Carriquiri, Alejandro Aguado, Gaspar Remisa, José Buschenthal, and Domingo de Norzagaray. The bank had initial capital of 100 million reales in shares and credits. It made generous loans to industrial and mining enterprises, but also to prominent members of the Spanish royal family such as the queen mother and former regent Maria Christina of the Two Sicilies and her husband, both of whom speculated heavily in railways. It favored the Moderate governments of General Ramón María Narváez. It bought shares of other French and British financial institutions, some of which were its own creditors. It made many loans to insolvent companies, many owned by its own managers. Its risky approach to finance did not fare well. To save it from failure, on 25 February 1847 the Minister of Finance merged it with the much healthier Bank of San Fernando, which focused its activity on the finances of the State. The resulting bank retained the name Bank of San Fernando until 1856, when it became the Bank of Spain.

== See also ==
- List of banks in Spain
