= Salamanca (Madrid) =

Coordinates: 40°25′48″N 3°40′40″W

- District
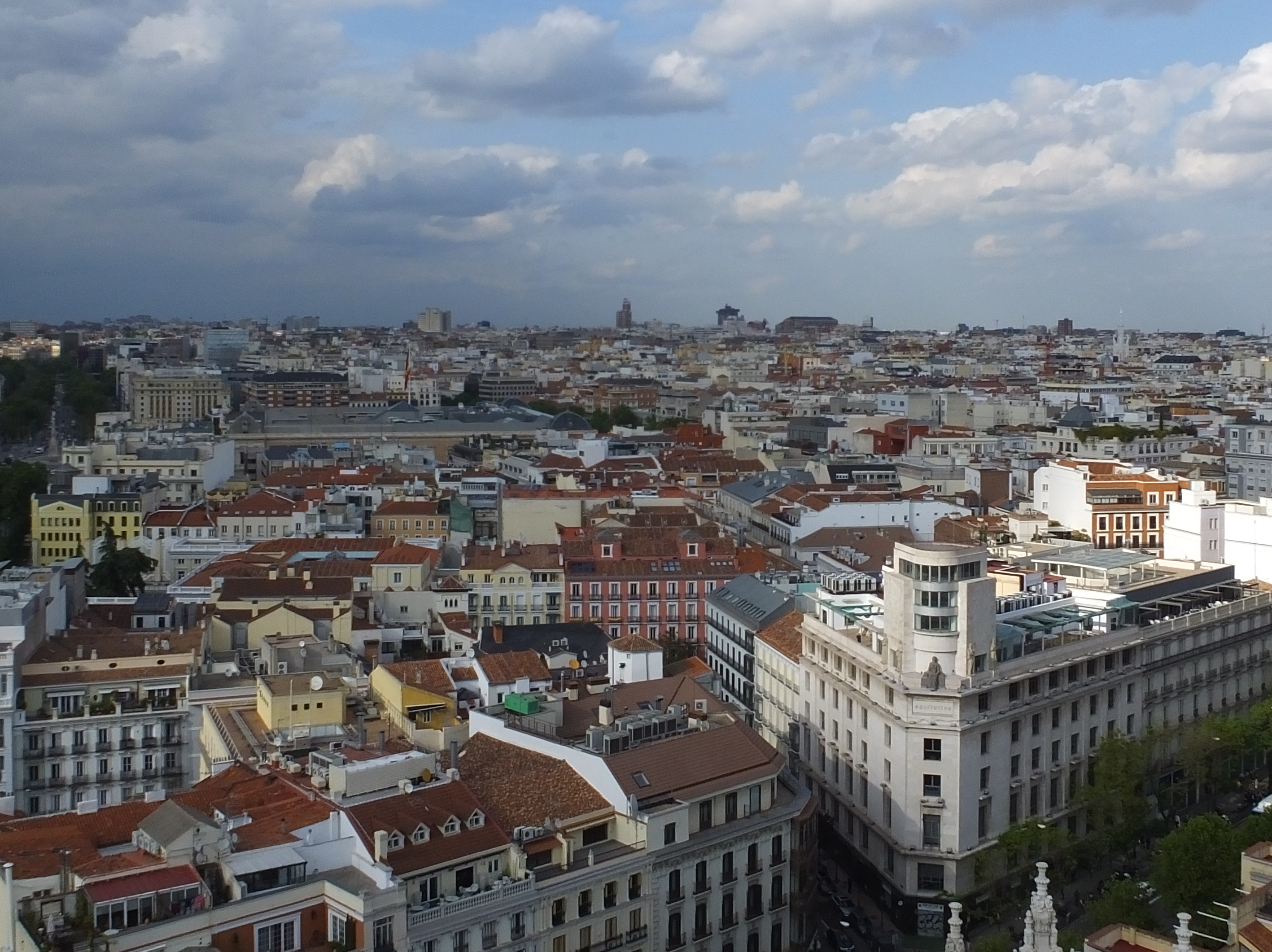

- Country: Spain
- Region: Community of Madrid
- Municipality: Madrid

Government
  - Councillor-President: Cayetana Hernández de la Riva (PP, 2023)

Area
  - Total: 5.38 km^{2} (2.08 sq mi)

Population
  - Total: 147,707
  - Density: 27,418/km^{2} (71,010/sq mi)
- Postal code: 28032
- Madrid district number: 4

Salamanca (Spanish pronunciation: [salaˈmaŋka]) is one of the 21 districts that form the city of Madrid, Spain. Salamanca is located to the northeast of the historical center of Madrid. Salamanca lies east of the district of Chamberí, south of Chamartín, and north of Retiro. Salamanca has about 150,000 inhabitants.

The district takes its name from the 1st Marquess of Salamanca, José de Salamanca y Mayol, a powerful businessman who was one of the richest men in the world during the mid-nineteenth century.

== Geography ==
=== Overview ===
The limits of Salamanca district are defined by the Paseo de Recoletos and the Paseo de la Castellana to the west, the Calle de Alcalá and Calle O'Donnell to the south, the Avenida de la Paz (M-30) to the east and María de Molina Street and Avenida de América to the north. It covers an area of 540.742 hectares.

=== Subdivision ===
The district is administratively divided into 6 wards (Barrios):

- Castellana
- Fuente del Berro
- Goya
- Guindalera
- Lista
- Recoletos

== History ==
The population of Madrid at the beginning of the 19th century was about 220,000, increasing to 300,000 inhabitants in the late 1850s. However, the city was still enclosed within the defensive wall built in 1625 by king Philip IV of Spain, which blocked the city's growth. In 1857, the government allowed the then Minister of Public Works and Transportation Claudio Moyano to expand the city (Plan Castro). Queen Isabella II allowed this in 1860 and the defensive walls were torn down in order to build the first Madrilian ensanche. Don José de Salamanca y Mayol, 1st Marquess of Salamanca, gave his name to the area because of his involvement in the project. It was completely urbanized by 1927.

Since then, the Salamanca district has been one of the most representative areas for bourgeois madrileños. Salamanca is in the outer area of the Rondas, where the neighborhoods of Guindalera and Fuente del Berro originated with more spontaneous urban development. Nowadays, the Salamanca district is one of the wealthiest areas in Madrid and some of its streets, such as Goya or Serrano, are some of the most expensive streets in Spain.

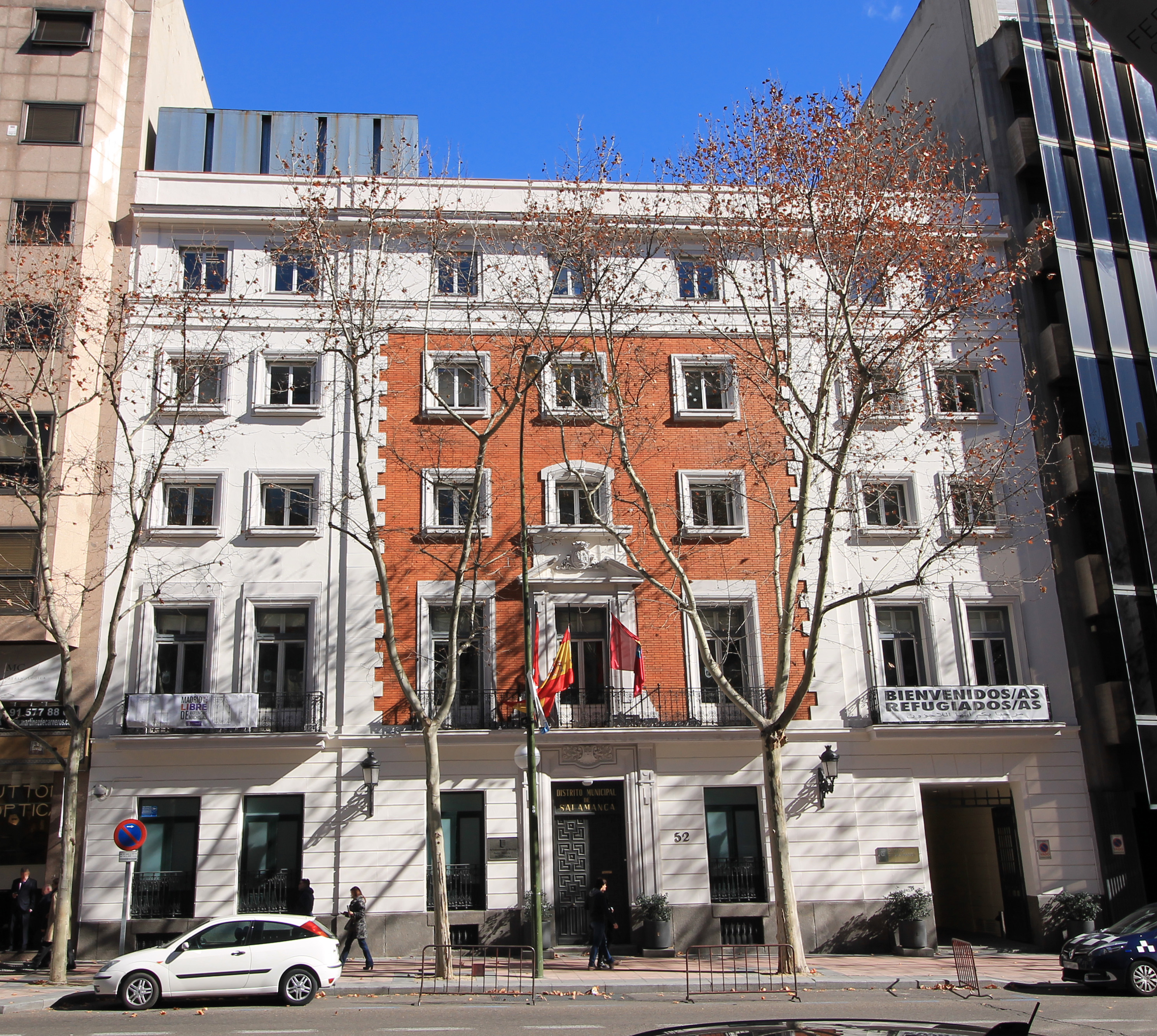
Salamanca District Hall.

== Politics ==
The district of Salamanca had more than 72% of its votes given to the People's Party (conservative) in the Spanish regional elections of 2007 as well as in 2003 in both elections being the candidates to the City Hall and the Autonomous Community Alberto Ruiz Gallardón and Esperanza Aguirre respectively. The district has also voted strongly in favor of the People's Party in all the recent Spanish general elections as well as the European Parliament elections in 2009 and before then.

== Demographics ==
Salamanca has about 150,775 inhabitants in 58.742 houses, with a density of 279 people per hectare.

== Economy ==
Salamanca is one of the wealthiest and most expensive areas in Madrid, with a comparatively high cost of living and some of the most expensive real estate in the city. Calle de Serrano is the third most expensive street in Spain, according to Cushman & Wakefield.

A significant number of diplomatic missions are in Salamanca, such as the Swiss embassy at Calle de Núñez de Balboa and C/ Goya, the French embassy on C/ Villalar, the United States embassy on C/ Serrano, and the Italian embassy on C/ Juan Bravo.

Salamanca is also home to the IE Business School (previously Instituto de Empresa) which is ranked among the top 10 business schools in the world.

== Photogallery ==
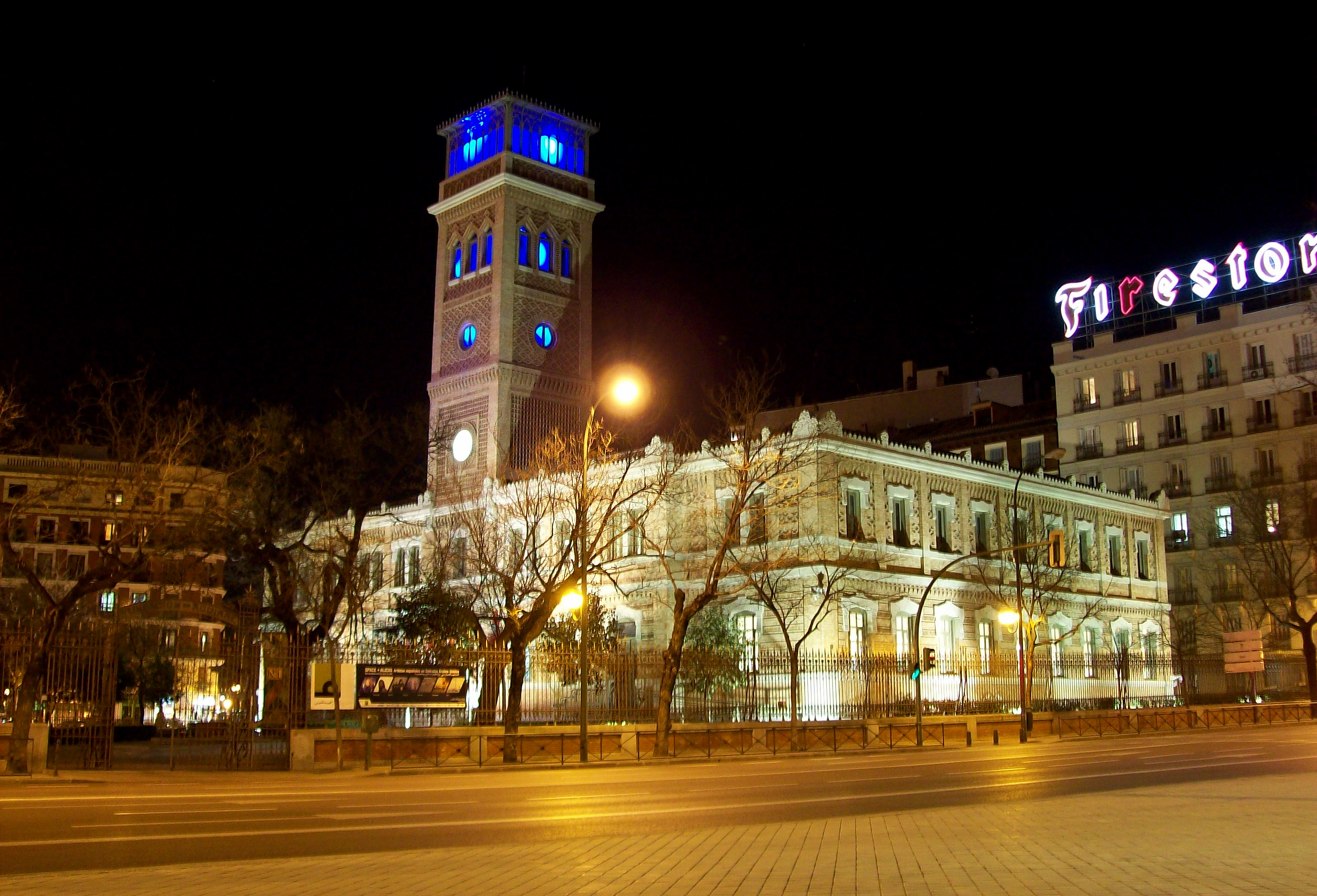
Arab House

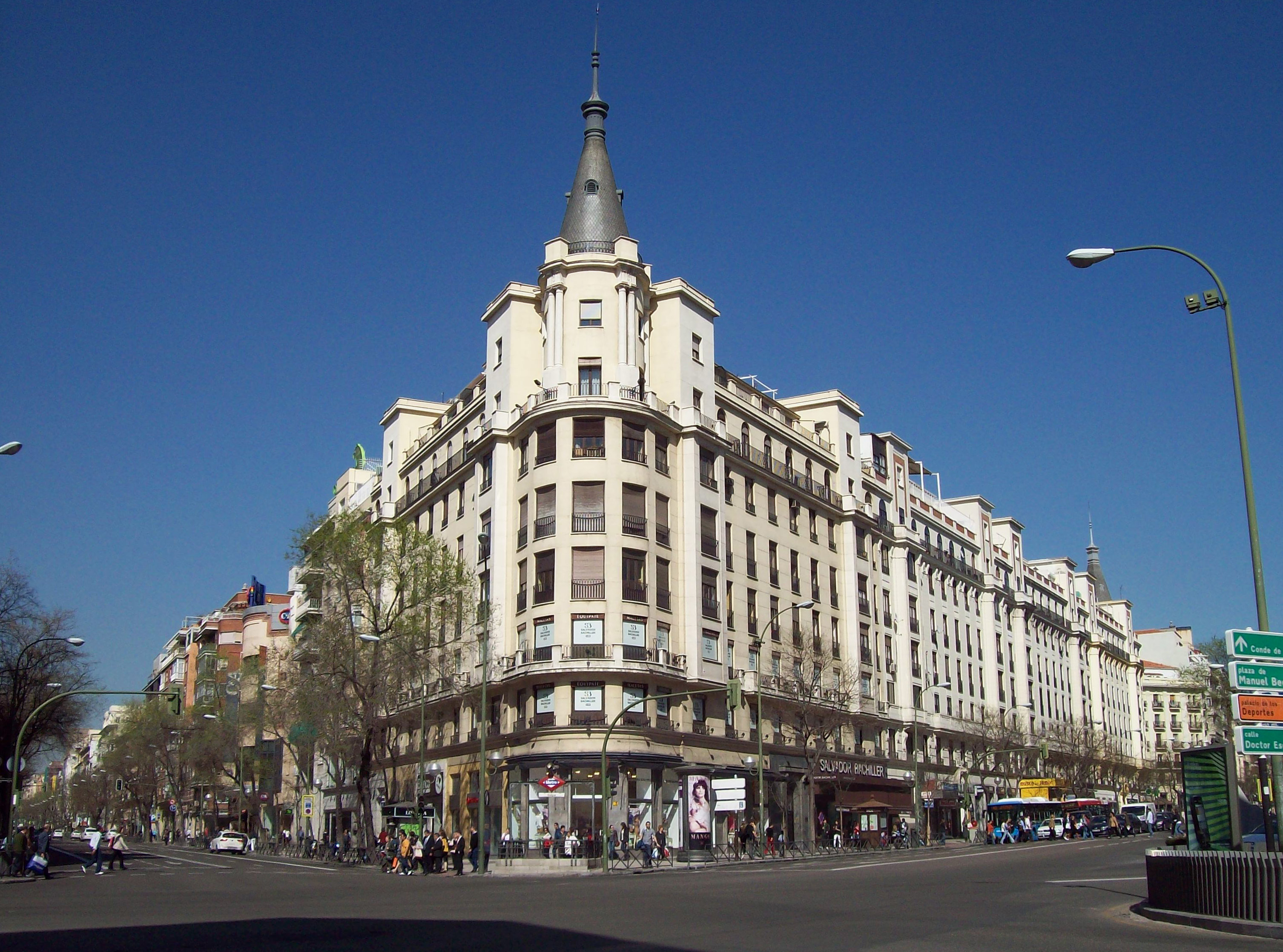
Calle de Alcalá (street)

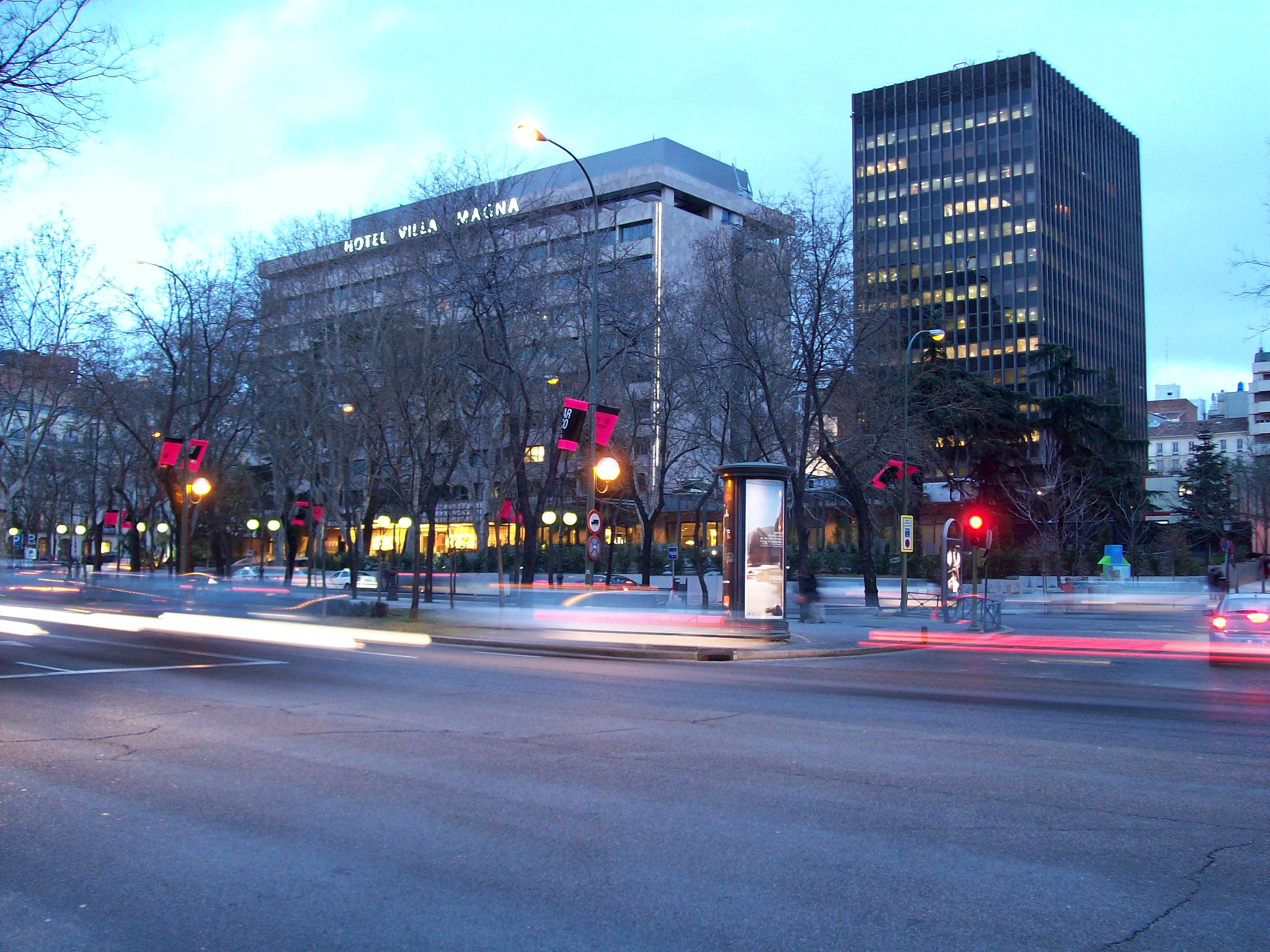
Paseo de la Castellana (avenue)
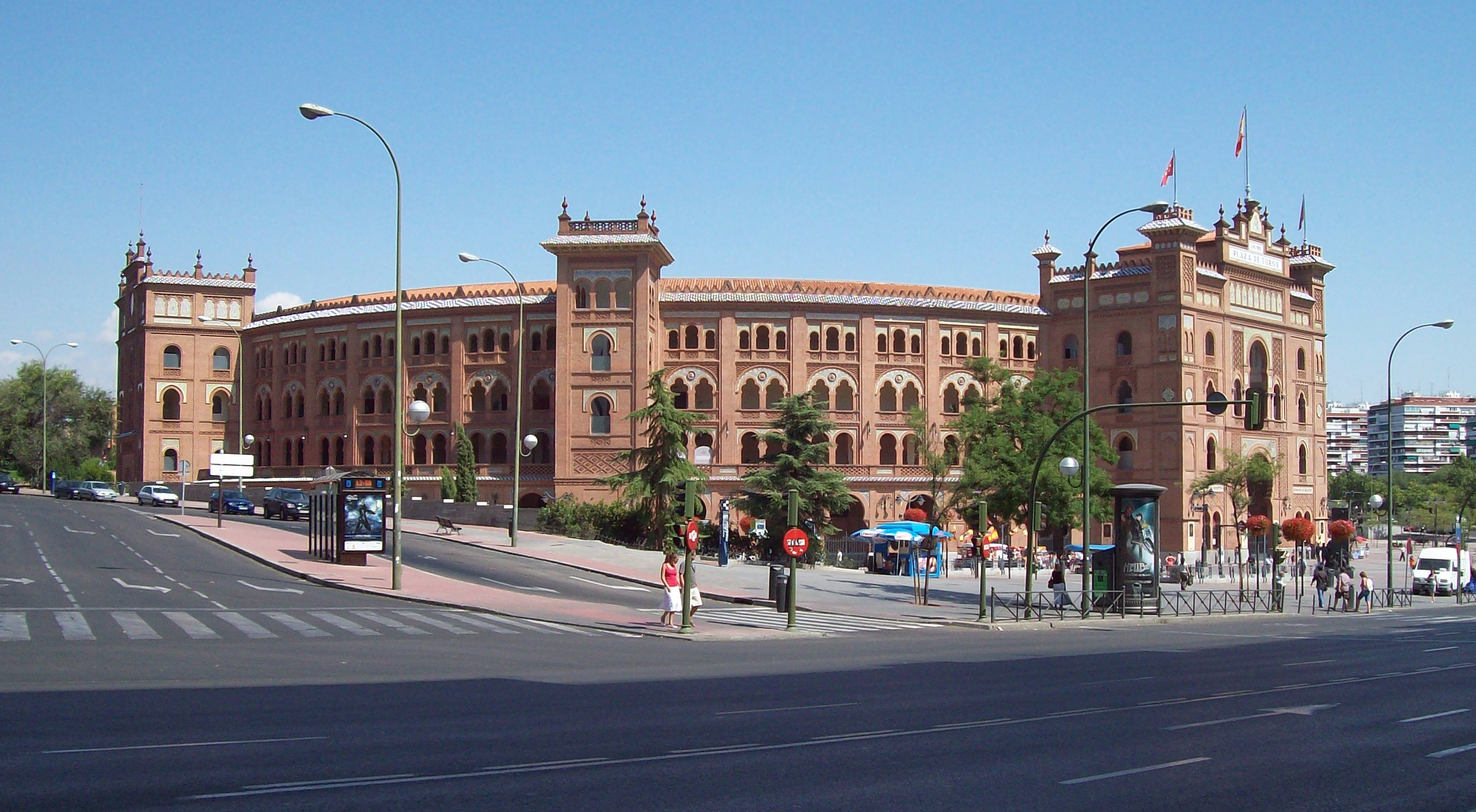
Las Ventas Bullring

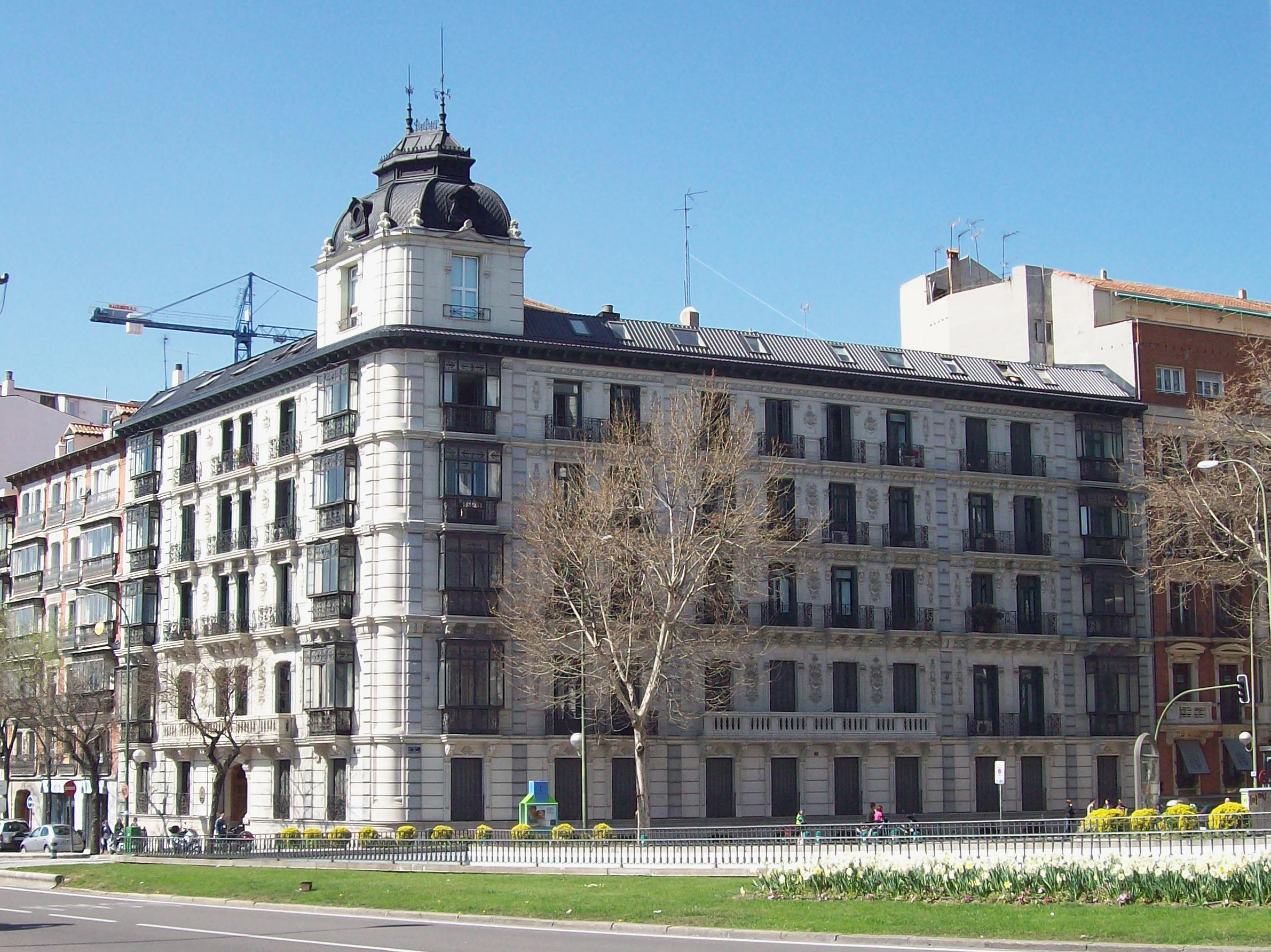
1903 house-palace

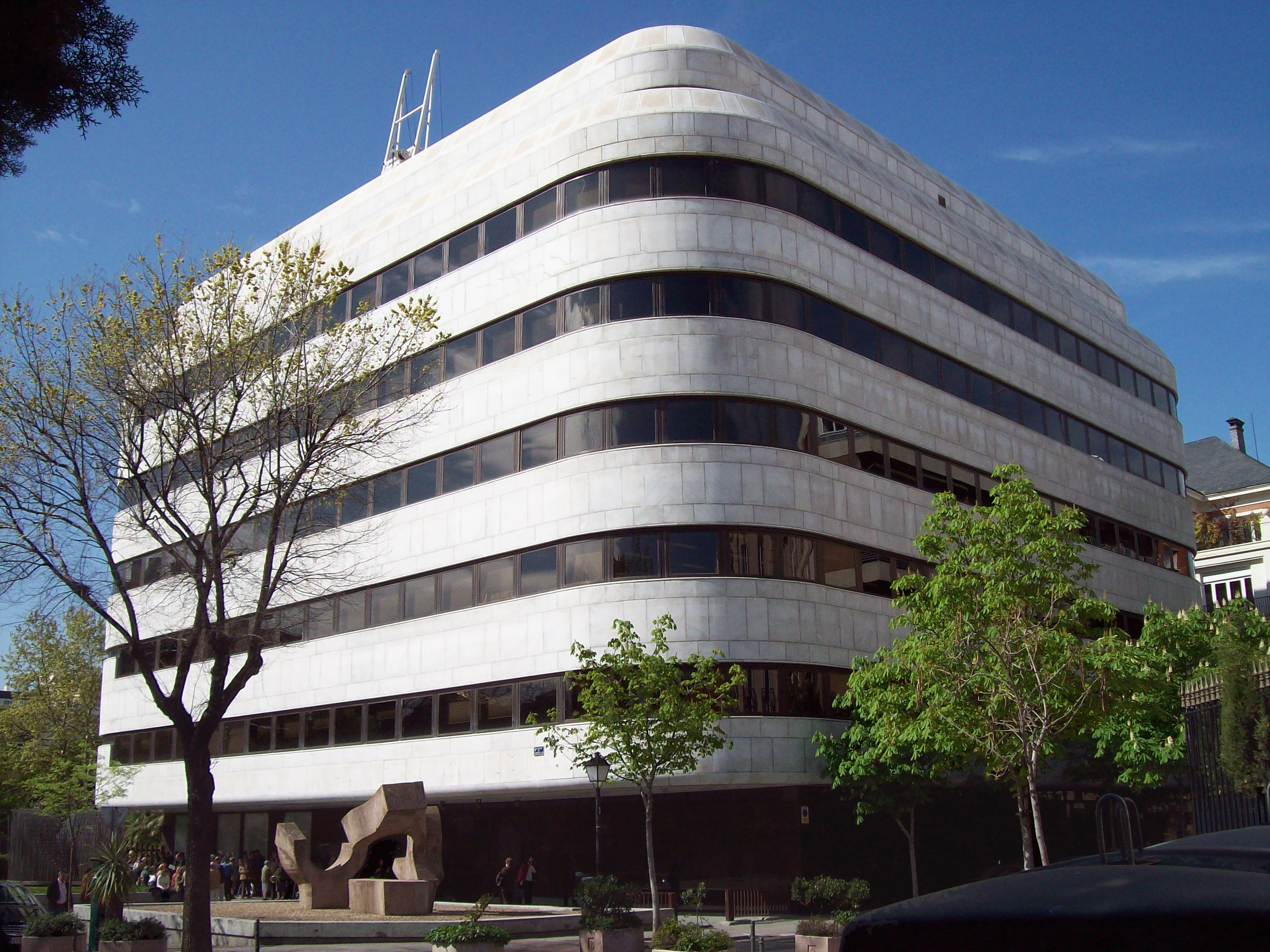
Juan March Foundation
