= Buenaventura Carlos Aribau =

Spanish writer, politician and economist (1798–1862)

Bonaventura Carles Aribau
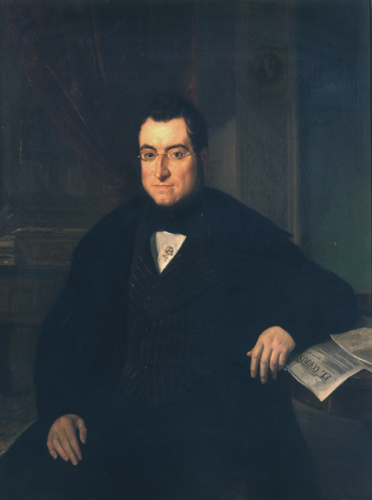
- Bonaventura Carles Aribau (1844) oil of Joaquim Espalter, to the Reial Acadèmia Catalana de Belles Arts de Sant Jordi of Barcelona
- Born: November 4, 1798 Barcelona, Spain
- Died: September 17, 1862 (aged 63) Barcelona, Spain
- Occupation: Economist, writer, politician, stenographer
- Language: Spanish, Catalan, Latin, Italian

Buenaventura Carlos Aribau y Farriols (1798–1862) was a Spanish economist, stenographer, writer and politician who wrote in Spanish, Catalan, Latin, and Italian.

== Biography ==
With an enormous intellectual curiosity, he studied rhetoric and poetry at the Conciliar Seminary. He did not finish his studies of hydrostatics, statics and experimental physics at the Junta de Comerç, due to serious family problems. As a young man, he was one of the founders of the Societat Filosòfica in 1815, and published Ensayos poéticos.

In 1820, he enthusiastically participated in the revolution that initiated Riego's Liberal Triennium. At the same time, he collaborated with the Diario Constitucional (Constitutional Newspaper) and began his career in journalism, and also started in politics by becoming secretary of the Diputació de Lleida (1823). At that time he joined the Academy of Fine Arts (1820) and in 1823 he was one of the co-founders and editors of El Europeo, the first great Catalan project of romantic journalism. In this sense, it is considered that he was influenced by the Italian romantic writer Alessandro Manzoni, who founded the magazine Conciliatore. Aribau, moreover, suggested to his friend Juan Nicasio Gallego to translate Manzoni into Spanish. Aribau also shared a friendship with the writer and lawyer Ramon Muns i Serinyà.

He was also director of El Corresponsal (1839–1844), which was founded thanks to the financial support of his friend, Gaspar de Remisa, 1st Marquess of Remisa.

== Works ==
- Poetic Essays (1817)
- Libertad, libertad sacrosanct, revolutionary anthem (1820)
- The freedom restored, collaboration with other authors (1820)
- In Ms. Leticia Cortesi (1821)
- The Homeland (1833)
- Sicacnger All'eximia artist Manuela Oreiro Lemma Vega, che nella Dimora home adjoining quella dell'autore (1840)
- The Virgen of Dolores (1845)
- In Ms. Maria Dolores Belza
