= Gaspar de Remisa, 1st Marquess of Remisa =

Spanish banker and politician

The Most Excellent The Marquess of Remisa
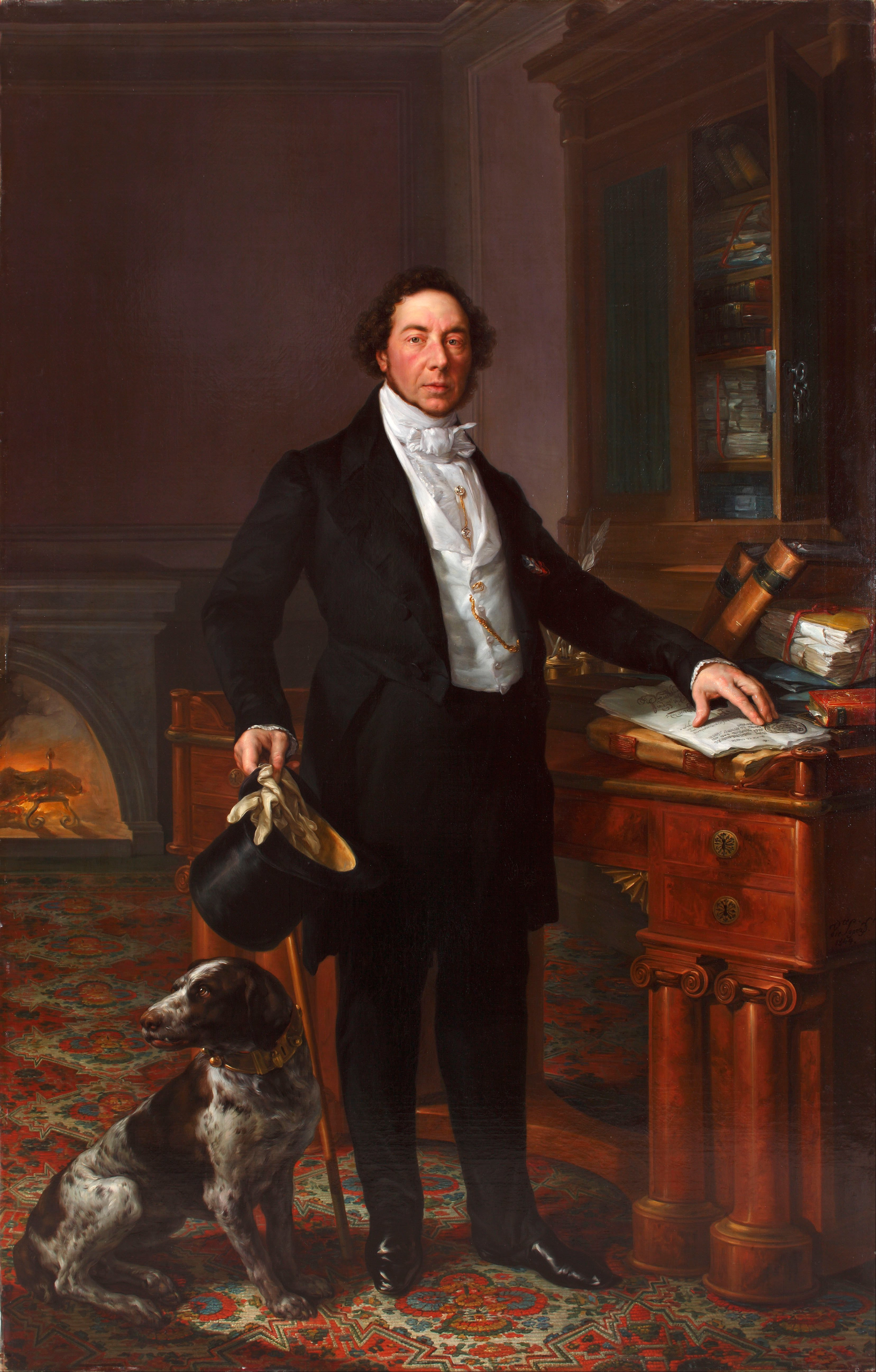
- Portrait of the marquess, by Vicente López Portaña (Romanticism Museum). 1844

Senator for life
- In office 15 August 1845 – 26 November 1847

Senator for Málaga & Ourense
- In office 6 July 1838 – 15 August 1845

Director-General for the Treasury
- In office 17 August 1826 – 27 December 1833
- Preceded by: Luis Gargollo
- Succeeded by: Julián Aquilino Pérez

Personal details
- Born: 3 November 1784 Sant Hipòlit de Voltregà, Spain
- Died: 26 November 1847 (aged 63) Madrid, Spain
- Spouse: Mariana Teresa Rafo de Tolosa (m. 1822)
- Children: 2

Gaspar de Remisa y Miarons, 1st Marquess of Remisa (3 November 1784 – 26 November 1847) was a Spanish banker and politician.

== Biography ==
Remisa was born in Sant Hipòlit de Voltregà (Barcelona), into a wealthy family of merchants. He joined the family business from an early age, trading with all kinds of products in Barcelona and, during the Peninsular War, he trade with both sides. After the war ended, and thanks to his friendship with The Duke of Bailén —at that time captain general of Catalonia— he obtained numerous public contracts. In 1823 he created, along with his cousin, Josep Casals Remisa, the Casals Remisa Bank.

After his business success, he moved to Madrid, where he began to participate in politics. In 1825, he was appointed Treasurer of the Army and, the following year, director-general for the Treasury (a position known before 1824 as Treasurer General of the Kingdom) and member of the Royal Council of Finance, serving as such until December 1833. At the same time, he continued promoting business, reviving old projects such as the Canal de Castilla or entering the mining business at the Riotinto-Nerva mining basin. He also promoted the creation of the Bolsa de Madrid and financed the creation of newspaper El Corresponsal (1839–1844), led by one of his friends, Buenaventura Carlos Aribau.

He became a close ally and financial advisor to Queen María Christina, The Queen Regent, marrying his elder daughter, María de los Dolores, to the Queen's second husband's brother. In 1840, The Queen Regent, in the name of her infant daughter, Queen Isabella II, granted him the title of Marquess of Remisa.

In 1838 he was appointed senator for Málaga and, since 1843, for Ourense. In 1845 he was appointed senator for life. Meanwhile, he was a member of the board of directors of the Bank of Isabella II and, during the 1847 financial crisis, he supported the merger of the San Fernando and Isabelal II banks. From April to October 1847, he served as vicepresident of the Council of Agriculture and Commerce, advising the minister for trade, education and public works.

He died on 26 November 1847 in Madrid, at the age of 63. According to contemporary press reports, “on the night of Tuesday [November 23]” —the early morning of Wednesday— he suffered a “cerebral congestion” or “apoplectic stroke”, passing away three days later. He was buried in the afternoon of Tuesday, 30 November 1847. His wife, María Teresa, passed away in January of the following year.

== Marriage and children ==
In 1822 he married Mariana Teresa Rafo de Tolosa, with whom he had two daughters:

1. María de los Dolores Remisa y Rafo, 2nd and last Marchioness of Remisa. She married Jesús Muñoz y Sánchez, brother of The Duke of Riánsares, second husband of Queen Regent María Christina. They had five children.
2. María de la Concepción de Remisa y Rafo, married to businessman Segismundo Moret y Quintana, uncle of Segismundo Moret, several times prime minister of Spain from 1905 to 1910.

== Titles, honours and styles ==
=== Titles and honours ===
On 4 February 1840 he was created Viscount of Casa Sanz and, once he had paid all the related taxes, he was created Marquess of Remisa on 24 February 1840. The Viscounty was suppressed as it was a prior and legally necessary title to the granting of a noble title.

During his life, he was also made Knight Grand Cross of the Order of Isabella the Catholic (1833) and Commander by Number of the Order of Charles III. Since 1830, he was also commander of the Royal Order of Francis I (Kingdom of the Two Sicilies). Also, he was an honorary member of the Royal Academy of Fine Arts of San Fernando and the Royal Academy of Fine Arts of the Immaculate Conception.

=== Styles ===
- 30 December 1833 – 24 February 1840: The Most Excellent Don Gaspar de Remisa y Miarons
- 4 February 1840 – 24 February 1840: The Most Excellent The Viscount of Casa Sanz
- 24 February 1840 – 26 November 1847: The Most Excellent The Marquess of Remisa
