= Castellana (Madrid) =

Coordinates: 40°26′0″N 3°41′05″W

- Neighborhood of Madrid
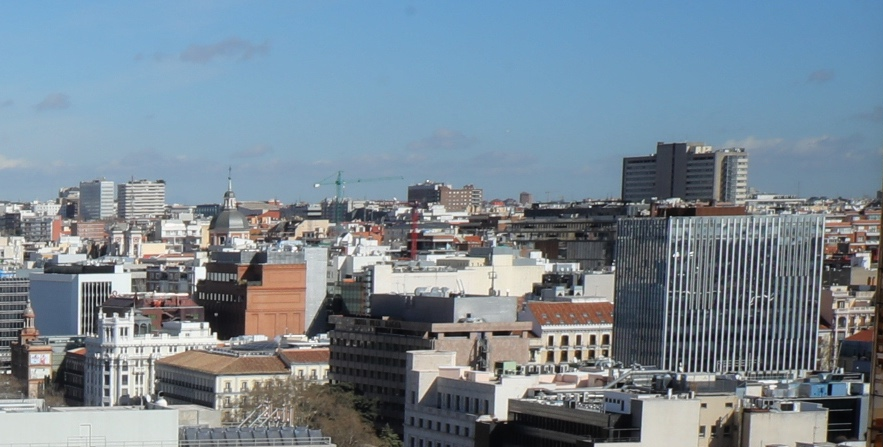
- Interactive map of Castellana
- Country: Spain
- Autonomous community: Madrid
- Municipality: Madrid
- District: Salamanca

Area
  - Total: 0.77323 km^{2} (0.29855 sq mi)

Castellana is a neighborhood (barrio) of Madrid belonging to the district of Salamanca. It is 0.77323 km^{2} in size.
