= La Guindalera =

Coordinates: 40°26′09″N 3°40′06″W

- City neighborhood
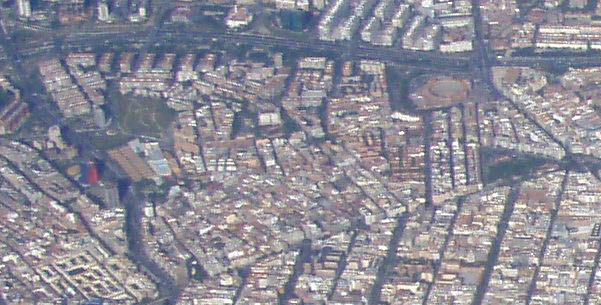

- Interactive map of La Guindalera
- Country: Spain
- Region: Community of Madrid
- Municipality: Madrid
- District: Salamanca

Area
  - Total: 1.598962 km^{2} (0.617363 sq mi)

Population (2020)
  - Total: 42,516
  - Density: 26,590/km^{2} (68,867/sq mi)

Guindalera or La Guindalera is an administrative neighborhood (barrio) of Madrid belonging to the district of Salamanca. It has an area of 1.598962 km^{2} (0.617363 sq mi). As of 1 March 2020, it has a population of 42,516.

It is limited by the Avenida de América, the Calle de Alcalá, the Calle de Francisco Silvela and the Avenida de la Paz (the eastern stretch of the M-30). Las Ventas bullring is located in the neighborhood.
