= Fuente del Berro =

Coordinates: 40°25′29″N 3°39′50″W

- City neighborhood
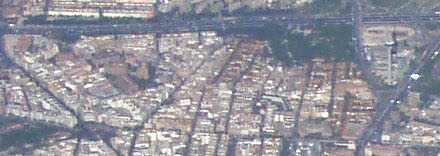

- Interactive map of Fuente del Berro
- Country: Spain
- Region: Community of Madrid
- Municipality: Madrid
- District: Salamanca

Area
  - Total: 0.852579 km^{2} (0.329183 sq mi)

Population (2020)
  - Total: 21,341
  - Density: 25,031/km^{2} (64,830/sq mi)

Fuente del Berro is an administrative neighborhood (barrio) of Madrid belonging to the district of Salamanca. It has an area of 0.852579 km^{2} (0.329183 sq mi). As of 1 March 2020, it has a population of 21,341. The park of the Quinta de la Fuente del Berro (after which the neighborhood is named) and El Pirulí are located in the neighborhood.
