= Bank of Spain =

Central Bank of Spain

Bank of Spain Banco de España
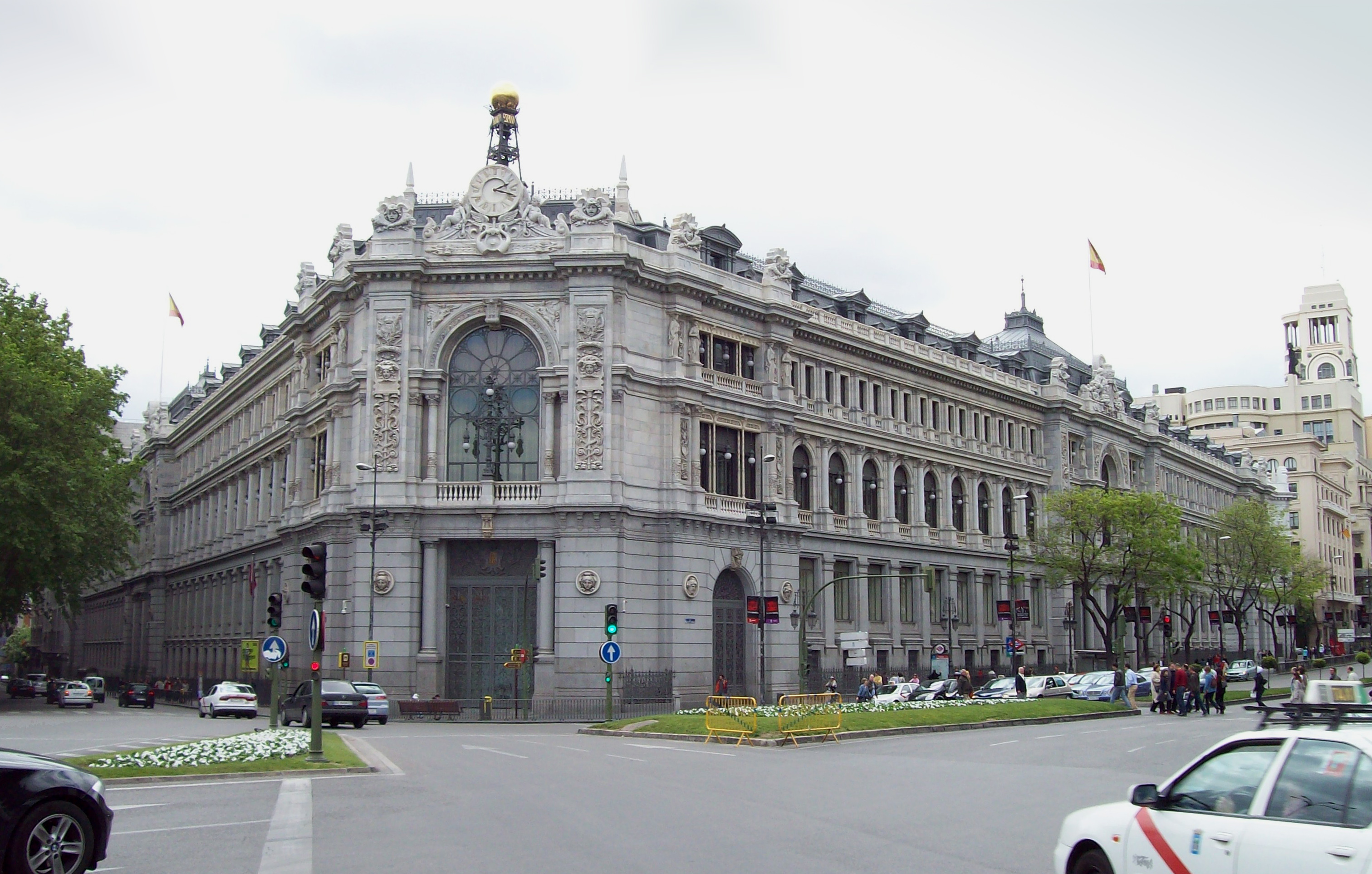
- The Bank of Spain Building in Madrid, hosting the Banco de España since 1891.
- Central bank of: Government of Spain
- Headquarters: Bank of Spain Building, Calle de Alcalá, Madrid
- Coordinates: 40°25′06″N 3°41′41″W
- Established: 2 June 1782; 244 years ago
- Ownership: 100% state ownership
- Governor: José Luis Escrivá
- Reserves: €110.5 billion 9.05 million troy ounces (October 2026)
- Preceded by: Bank of San Fernando
- Succeeded by: European Central Bank (1999)^{1}
- Website: www.bde.es
- The Bank of Spain still exists but many functions have been taken over by the ECB.

The Bank of Spain (Spanish: Banco de España, pronounced [ˈbaŋko ðe esˈpaɲa]) is the national central bank for Spain within the Eurosystem. It was the Spanish central bank from 1874 to 1998, issuing the peseta. Since 2014, it has also been Spain's national competent authority within European Banking Supervision. It was originally established by Charles III in Madrid in 1782, as the Banco Nacional de San Carlos, and took its current name in 1856. Its activity is regulated by the Bank of Spain Autonomy Act. The bank doesn't translate its name to English but uses its Spanish name in all English communications.

The Bank of Spain holds 9.1 million troy ounces of gold (around 283 tons) (2019), which are stored in its own vaults and in various institutions in London and New York. According to IMF data, Spain ranks 20th among the 40 largest gold reserves in the world (as of July 2015).

In addition to its monetary role, the Bank of Spain is also a financial supervisory authority. In that capacity, it increasingly implements policies set at the European Union level. It is the national competent authority for Spain within European Banking Supervision. It is a voting member of the Board of Supervisors of the European Banking Authority (EBA). It is also a member of the European Systemic Risk Board (ESRB).

== History ==
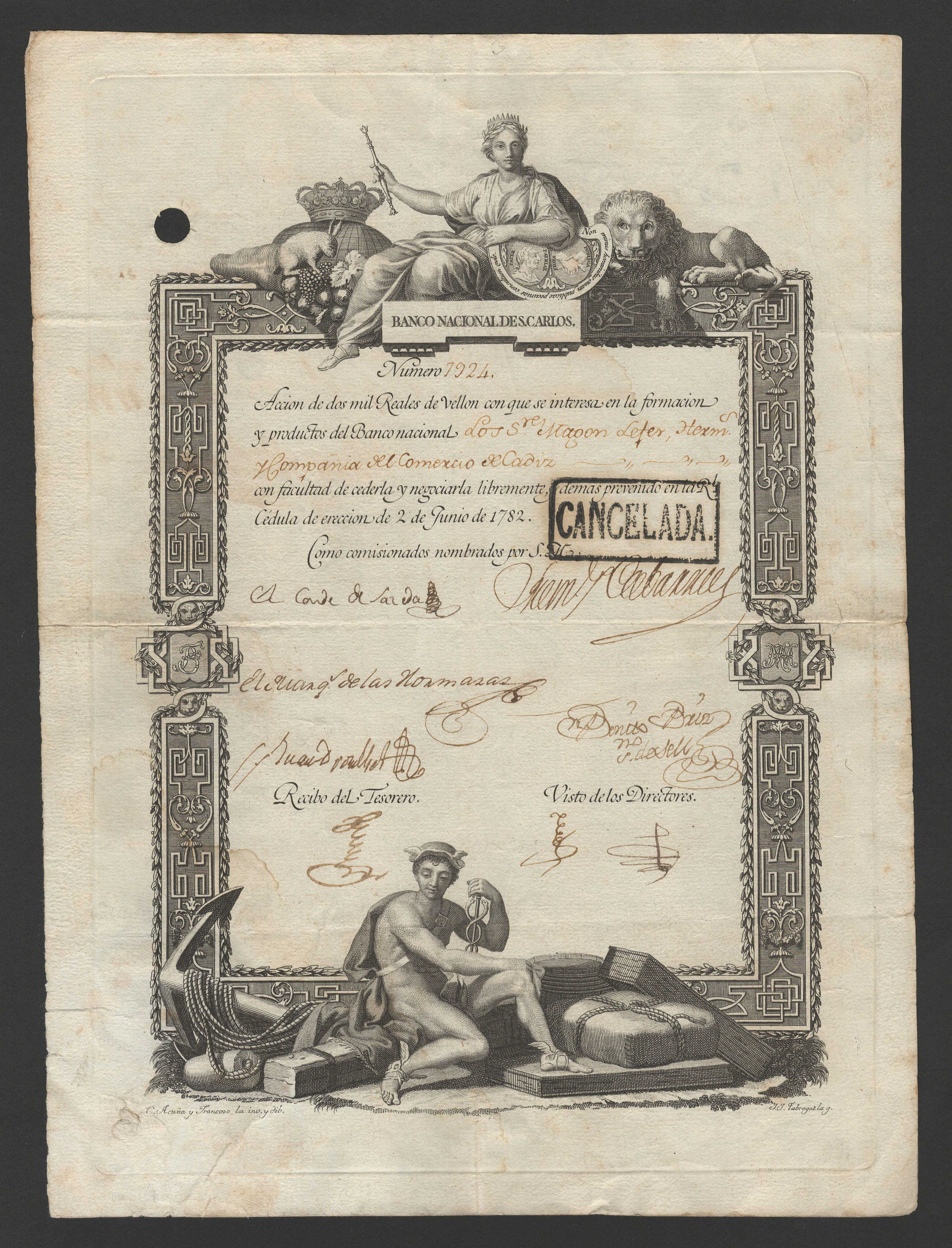
Share of the Banco Nacional de San Carlos, issued 2 June 1782

Originally named the Banco Nacional de San Carlos, it was founded in 1782 by Charles III in Madrid, to stabilize government finances through its state bonds (vales reales) following the American Revolutionary War in which Spain gave military and financial support to the Thirteen Colonies. Although it aided the state, the bank was initially owned privately by stockholders. Its assets included those of "Spanish capitalists, French rentiers, and several treasuries of Indian communities in New Spain" (colonial Mexico). Its first director was the French banker François Cabarrus, known in Spain as Francisco Cabarrús.

Following the Napoleonic invasion of Spain during the Peninsular War between 1808 and 1813, the bank was owed more than 300 million reales by the state, placing it in financial difficulty. Treasury Minister Luis López Ballesteros created a fund of 40 million reales in 1829 against which the bank could issue its own notes at Madrid. It did so after renaming itself Banco Español de San Fernando (the name of the king of Spain was Fernando VII).

In 1844 the competing Banco de Isabel II and Banco de Barcelona were established, followed in 1846 by the Banco de Cádiz. In 1847, after overexposure in the failing property market of Madrid, the Banco de Isabel II merged with Banco de San Fernando and retained the latter name.

Under the guidance of Ramón Santillán in the 1850s, the bank extended its operations to the cities of Alicante and Valencia and took the name, Banco de España. Requiring financial support from the bank to back its civil and colonial wars, the government of Spain granted the Banco de España a monopoly on the issuance of Spanish bank notes in 1874. Construction of the bank's headquarters building began in 1884 at the crossing of the Calle de Alcalá and the Paseo del Prado in Madrid.

In 1936, 510 tonnes of gold reserves were transferred to the Soviet Union (in an event known as Moscow gold) corresponding to 72.6% of the total gold reserves of the Bank of Spain. That gold remained there during the Spanish Civil War.

In 1946, the government of General Franco placed the bank under tight control. It was formally nationalised in 1962. After the restoration of democracy in the late 1970s, the bank began a series of transformations and modernisations which continue to today.

On Spain's entry into the Economic and Monetary Union of the European Union in 1994, the Banco de España became a member of the European System of Central Banks. The Bank of Spain holds 8.84% of the ECB's capital.

In January 2021, the snowstorm "Filomena" caused the clock at the Bank of Spain to freeze for the first time in 130 years. This occurred at 11:35 a.m. on Saturday, 9 January.

== Governing structure ==
The governing structure of the Bank has four branches:

- The Governor
- The Deputy Governor
- The Governing Council
- The Executive Commission

The Governor of the Bank of Spain is designated by the Prime Minister of Spain and formally appointed by the Spanish monarch. The Governor must be a Spanish citizen recognized for his or her competence in monetary or banking matters. When a new Governor is named, the Minister of Economy and Finance, in accord with procedure established by the Congress of Deputies, informs the competent parliamentary commission. The current Governor is José Luis Escrivá.

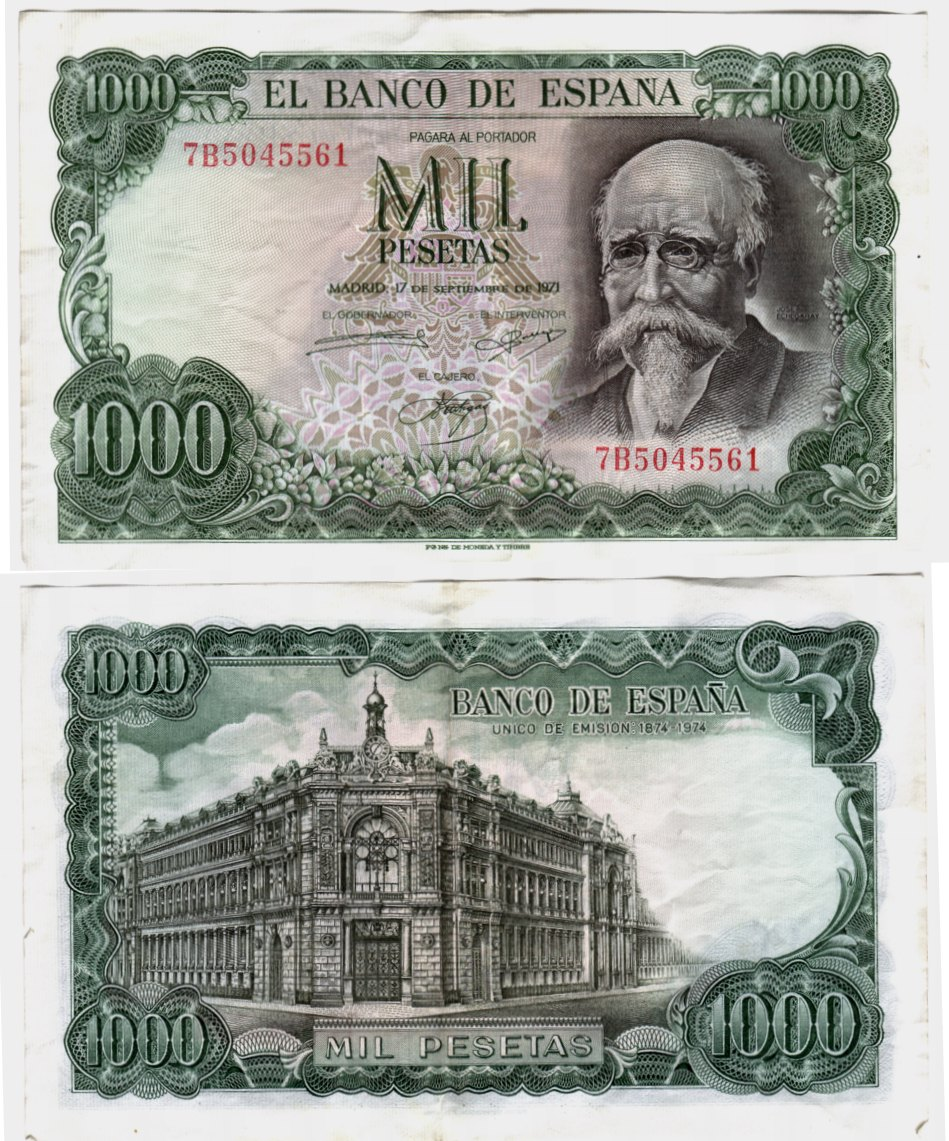
A 1,000 pesetas note with the image of José Echegaray and the Bank of Spain

The tasks of the Governor include:

- Direct the Bank and preside over the Governing Council and Executive Commission;
- Take primary responsibility for the Bank's lawfully fulfilling its responsibilities. The Governor has ultimate responsibility authorizing bank contracts and other legal documents and for representing the Bank at justice tribunals;
- Represent the Bank in international institutional dealings;
- Function as a member of the Governing Council of the Bank and as a member of the General Council of the European System of Central Banks.

The Deputy Governor, designated by the national Government on the recommendation of the Governor of the Bank, should meet all of the official qualifications for the governorship. The current Deputy Governor of the Bank of Spain is Margarita Delgado. The Deputy Governor substitutes for the Governor in cases of vacancy, absence or illness, both as director of the Bank and as its representative. Further responsibilities of this office are a matter internal to the Bank, and are delegated by the Governor.

Six Bank Counsellors are named by the national Government, on the proposal of the Minister of Economy and Finance, with the involvement of the Governor of the Bank. They must be Spanish citizens recognized for their competence in economics or law.

The Deputy Governor is in charge of seven directorates:

- General Banking Supervision
- General Cash and Branches
- General Economics, Statistics and Research
- General Financial Stability, Regulation and Resolution
- General Operations, Markets and Payments Systems
- General Service
- General Secretariat

The Executive Commission consists of:

- The Governor, who presides;
- The Deputy Governor;
- Two Counsellors.

The directors general of the Bank attend the meetings of the Executive Commission, with voice but without vote. The Secretary of the Bank functions as secretary of the Executive Commission, but without voice or vote.

The two Counsellors who serve as members of the Executive Commission are designated by the Governing Council, after nomination by the Governor, from among their own members (other than ex officio members). The Governing Council consists of:

- The Governor;
- The Deputy Governor;
- Six Counsellors;
- The director general of the treasury and of financial policy;
- The vice president of the Comisión Nacional Nacional del Mercado de Valores ("Stock Market National Commission").

Council meetings are also attended by the directors general of the Bank and by a representative of bank personnel (elected by a means determined by the Bank's internal rules), both with voice, but without vote.

The Minister of Economy and Finance or the Secretario de Estado de Economía ("Secretary of State for the Economy" [?]) may also attend (with voice, but without vote) those meetings of the Governing Council which will deal with matters relevant to their portfolios. They may also submit a motion for consideration by the council.

"The Secretary of the Bank functions as secretary of the Executive Commission, with voice, but without vote."

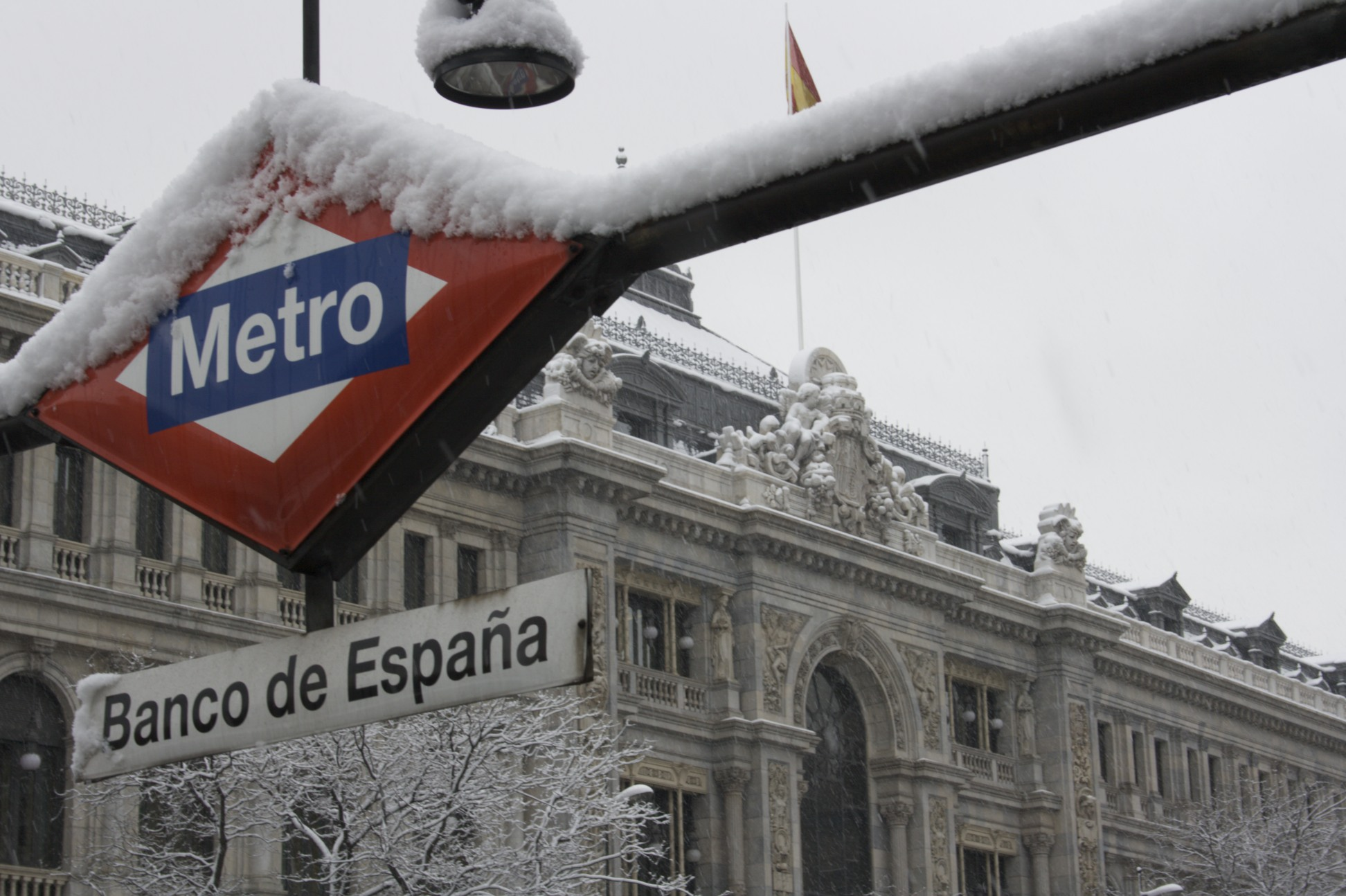
The Banco de España Metro

== Functions ==
Banco de España's functions are:

- Defining and implementing the Eurosystem's monetary policy, with the principal aim of maintaining price stability across the euro area'
- Conducting currency exchange operations consistent with the provisions of Article 109 of the Treaty on European Union, and holding and managing the State's official currency reserves;
- Promoting the sound working of payment systems in the euro area;
- Issuing legal tender banknotes;
- The holding and management of currency and precious metal reserves not transferred to the European Central Bank;
- The promotion of the sound working and stability of the financial system and, without prejudice to the functions of the ECB, of national payment systems;
- The supervision of the solvency and compliance with specific rules of credit institutions, other entities and financial markets, for which it has been assigned supervisory responsibility, in accordance with current provisions;
- Circulating coins and performing on the State's behalf all functions entrusted to it in this connection;
- Preparing and publishing data relating to its functions, and assisting the ECB in compiling statistical information;
- Providing treasury services and acting as financial agent for government debt;
- Advising the government, preparing appropriate reports and studies as required.

== Building ==
The building houses 280 tonnes of the Spanish gold reserve. This gold reserve is protected by a complex mechanism and is placed 37 meters underground. The security system includes three armored doors, a trench with a one-person wide bridge, and a water-flooding system that uses the water from two adjacent rivers that go below the Cibeles fountain, located next to the bank's building.

The building was to be used as a film location for the third season of the Spanish series Money Heist, but due to the bank's security system, filming moved into the Spanish Ministry of Development.

== See also ==
- Comisión Nacional del Mercado de Valores
- Money Heist, a television series in which the Bank of Spain is robbed.
- The Vault, a movie about a robbery in the Bank of Spain.
- List of central banks
- List of financial supervisory authorities by country
- List of banks in Spain
