= Bank of San Fernando =

Spanish financial institution

The Bank of San Fernando (Spanish: Banco de San Fernando or Banco Español de San Fernando) was a financial institution created in Spain in 1829 at the initiative of Finance Minister Luis López Ballesteros, replacing the old Bank of San Carlos. It assumed the debt of the Bank of San Carlos and increased its capital by replacing an uncollectable 77.4 million peseta government debt with 10 million in cash, with the intention of establishing Spain's first public bank, with the capacity to issue Spanish currency, although two thirds of its ownership was private.

Among its other activities, it became a de facto financial instrument to salvage the liquidity of Spanish finances, especially during the First Carlist War during the reign of Isabella II. It was merged in 1849 with the Bank of Isabella II (founded 1844), retaining the name Bank of San Fernando until 1856, when it became the Bank of Spain.
