= Districts of Madrid =

21 administrative units of Madrid

Madrid, the capital of Spain, is divided into 21 districts, which are further subdivided into 131 administrative wards. Additional neighborhoods exist outside the boundaries of administrative borders. Each district is governed by a body named Junta Municipal de Distrito. Residents of Madrid are typically called Madrileños.

== Districts and wards ==
Data as of 1st January 2017. Source: Área de Gobierno de Economía, Hacienda. Subdirección General de Estadística. Padrón Municipal de Habitantes.

District Number	Name	District area (Note: Superficie revisada según seccionado 2014) (Ha.)	Population	Population density (Hab./Ha.)	Location	Administrative wards
1	Centro	522.82	131,928	252.34		Palacio (11); Embajadores (12); Cortes (13); Justicia (14); Universidad (15); Sol (16)
2	Arganzuela	646.22	151,965	235.16		Imperial (21); Acacias (22); Chopera (23); Legazpi (24); Delicias (25); Palos de Moguer (26); Atocha (27)
3	Retiro	546.62	118,516	216.82		Pacífico (31); Adelfas (32); Estrella (33); Ibiza (34); Jerónimos (35); Niño Jesús (36)
4	Salamanca	539.24	143,800	266.67		Recoletos (41); Goya (42); Fuente del Berro (43); Guindalera (44); Lista (45); Castellana (46)
5	Chamartín	917.55	143,424	156.31		El Viso (51); Prosperidad (52); Ciudad Jardín (53); Hispanoamérica (54); Nueva España (55); Castilla (56)
6	Tetuán	537.47	153,789	286.13		Bellas Vistas (61); Cuatro Caminos (62); Castillejos (63); Almenara (64); Valdeacederas (65); Berruguete (66)
7	Chamberí	467.92	137,401	293.64		Gaztambide (71); Arapiles (72); Trafalgar (73); Almagro (74); Ríos Rosas (75); Vallehermoso (76)
8	Fuencarral-El Pardo	23,783.84	238,756	10.04		El Pardo (81); Fuentelarreina (82); Peñagrande (83); El Pilar (84); La Paz (85); Valverde (86); Mirasierra (87); El Goloso (88)
9	Moncloa-Aravaca	4,653.11	116,903	25.12		Casa de Campo (91); Argüelles (92); Ciudad Universitaria (93); Valdezarza (94); Valdemarín (95); El Plantío (96); Aravaca (97)
10	Latina	2,542.72	233,808	91.95		Los Cármenes (101); Puerta del Ángel (102); Lucero (103); Aluche (104); Campamento (105); Cuatro Vientos (106); Las Águilas (107)
11	Carabanchel	1,404.83	243,998	173.68		Comillas (111); Opañel (112); San Isidro (113); Vista Alegre (114); Puerta Bonita (115); Buenavista (116); Abrantes (117)
12	Usera	777.77	134,791	173.30		Orcasitas (121); Orcasur (122); San Fermín (123); Almendrales (124); Moscardó (125); Zofío (126); Pradolongo (127)
13	Puente de Vallecas	1,496.86	227,595	152.05		Entrevías (131); San Diego (132); Palomeras Bajas (133); Palomeras Sureste (134); Portazgo (135); Numancia (136)
14	Moratalaz	610.32	94,197	154.34		Pavones (141); Horcajo (142); Marroquina (143); Media Legua (144); Fontarrón (145); Vinateros (146)
15	Ciudad Lineal	1,142.57	212,529	186.01		Ventas (151); Pueblo Nuevo (152); Quintana (153); Concepción (154); San Pascual (155); San Juan Bautista (156); Colina (157); Atalaya (158); Costillares (159)
16	Hortaleza	2,741.98	180,462	65.81		Palomas (161); Piovera (162); Canillas (163); Pinar del Rey (164); Apóstol Santiago (165); Valdefuentes (166)
17	Villaverde	2,018.76	142,608	70.64		Villaverde Alto (171); San Cristóbal (172); Butarque (173); Los Rosales (174); Los Ángeles (175)
18	Villa de Vallecas	5,146.72	104,421	19.86		Casco Histórico de Vallecas (181); Santa Eugenia (182); Ensanche de Vallecas (183)
19	Vicálvaro	3,526.67	70,051	19.86		Casco Histórico de Vicálvaro (191); Valdebernardo (192); Valderrivas (193); El Cañaveral (194)
20	San Blas-Canillejas	2,229.24	154,357	69.24		Simancas (201); Hellín (202); Amposta (203); Arcos (204); Rosas (205); Rejas (206); Canillejas (207); Salvador (208)
21	Barajas	4,192.28	46,876	11.18		Alameda de Osuna (211); Aeropuerto (212); Casco Histórico de Barajas (213); Timón (214); Corralejos (215)
	TOTAL	60,445.51	3,182,175	52.65		

== Popular neighbourhoods ==
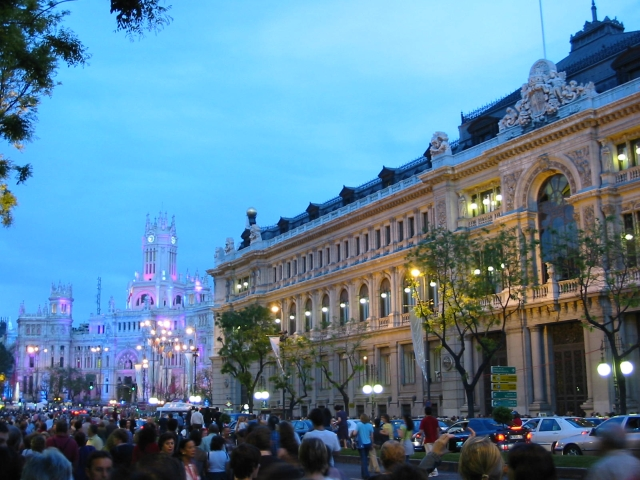
Bank of Spain building (foreground) and Palacio de Comunicaciones

Contemporary Madrid came into its own after the death of general Francisco Franco. Reaction against the dictatorial bureaucracy centered in Madrid, and a history of centralism that predated Franco by centuries has resulted in the successful modern movement towards increased autonomy for the regions of Spain, considered autonomous regions under the umbrella of Spain. The modern metropolis is home to over three million people.

=== Alonso Martínez ===
This area contains the large Plaza de Colón. This plaza commemorates Christopher Columbus, who was responsible for ushering in the Spanish imperial golden age of the 16th and 17th centuries. It is within walking distance of the main cultural and commercial areas of the city, such as the Prado museum, the expansive Parque del Buen Retiro and the business center on the lower part of the Paseo de la Castellana.

=== Atocha ===
Atocha covers a large area and is bordered by the Huertas and Lavapiés neighbourhoods. It contains several notable cultural institutions, including the Reina Sofía Museum. Also located here is the central bus terminal and the Atocha Railway Station, one of two main train stations in Madrid, the other being located in Chamartín. This was the main site of the train bombings carried out on March 11, 2004. Atocha was also the site of the 1977 Massacre of Atocha.

=== AZCA / Nuevos Ministerios ===
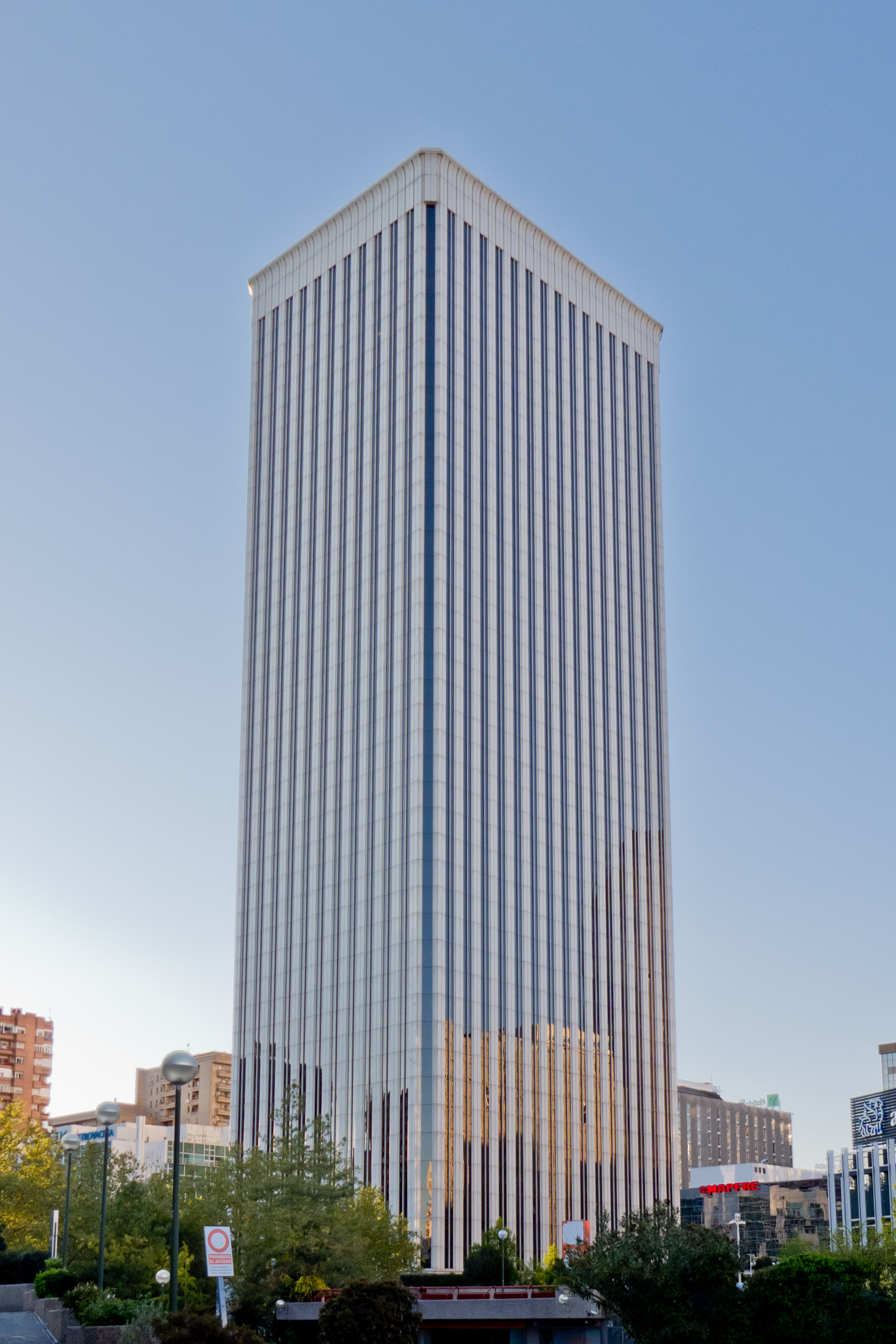
Torre Picasso, designed by Minoru Yamasaki

Located in the Cuatro Caminos ward, AZCA is the financial center of Madrid. The area is populated by skyscrapers, among them Torre Picasso at 157 metres (515 ft), Edificio BBVA at 107 metres (351 ft) and Torre Europa at 115 metres (377 ft). The skyscraper Torre Windsor once stood here as well, until it burned completely on the night of 12 February 2005. A large El Corte Inglés department store consisting of three interconnected buildings is also located here. The area is directly linked to Barajas Airport by metro line 8 at the Nuevos Ministerios station. It is the Parkour centre of Madrid.

=== Cuatro Torres Business Area ===
The Cuatro Torres Business Area is composed of the four tallest skyscrapers in Madrid. The tallest is Torre Bankia, once known as the Torre Repsol, at 250 metres (820 ft). It was designed by Sir Norman Foster, and is the third tallest skyscraper in Europe. Torre de Cristal, or 'Crystal Tower', is only 0.6 metres (2 ft 0 in) lower than Torre Bankia, at 249.4 metres (818 ft), and was designed by Cesar Pelli. Torre PwC is the third tallest in Madrid, at 235 metres (771 ft), and was designed by Enrique Alvarez & Carlos Rubio. The fourth skyscraper is Torre Espacio, or 'Space Tower'. It is 223 metres (732 ft) tall and it was designed by I.M. Pei. The four skyscrapers were finished in 2008.

=== Chueca ===
Chueca is well known as a centre of gay culture in Madrid.

=== Las Cortes ===
This small area is notable for housing the Congress of Deputies, known as the Congreso de los diputados, the lower house of the Spanish parliament. Other notable sites include the Thyssen-Bornemisza Museum, the Banco de España, the Café del Círculo de Bellas Artes, the Zarzuela Theater and the Plaza de Cibeles.

=== Huertas ===
This neighbourhood, also known as Barrio de las Letras, is west of the Paseo del Prado and north of Calle Atocha. Once the home and popular hangout of writers such as Miguel de Cervantes and Calderon de la Barca, Huertas is now considered Madrid's literary neighbourhood. One prominent landmark is the house where Cervantes died in 1616. It is a popular nightlife spot and tourist destination.

=== Gran Vía ===
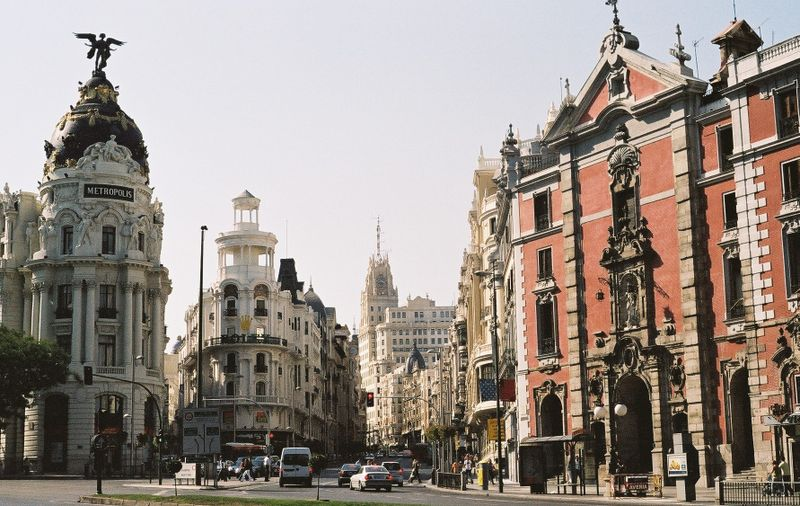
Gran Vía

As the name implies, the Gran Vía area contains one of Madrid's most important avenues, the Gran Vía (literally, "Great Way"). First and foremost it is a shopping street; however, it also contains a number of tourist accommodations, plenty of nightlife (including Madrid's large goth scene), many of Madrid's largest movie theaters and live musical shows. It is also a hub for Madrid's red-light district, as it links many side streets. One of these streets, calle Fuencarral, has become a link between the old shopping area of the center of the city, the Bohemian Malasaña, and the hip Chueca district, making of it one of the most cosmopolitan areas of the city.

=== Lavapiés ===
A historically poorer neighbourhood within the city center, Lavapiés has maintained much of true 'Madrileño' spirit of the past. Lavapiés has a high concentration of immigrants (mainly Bangladeshis), and also tends to attract Western European expats, artists and writers, adding to the cosmopolitan mix. It is changing rapidly under the pressures of gentrification.

=== La Latina ===
Edificio España

In and around La Latina are the origins of Madrid. Its difficult to put precise boundaries on La Latina, because, like its immediate neighbours, streets are narrow and winding. There are quite a few nightlife spots, though the neighbourhood is best known as having a concentration of tapas bars (particularly on the Cava Baja and Cava Alta). There are also a number of attractive churches, including the Church of San Andrés and the San Francisco el Grande Basilica. On Sundays and major holidays, the famous Rastro flea-market begins on the eastern edge, spilling out of the San Millan exit of the La Latina metro stop to the Plaza de Cascorro and all the way to the Ronda de Toledo to the south. Plaza de la Paja is another interesting location here. On its other side, La Latina borders Plaza Mayor and another ancient part of the town, El Madrid de los Austrias, where you can find the Palacio Real (Royal Palace).

=== Malasaña ===
Malasaña is famous for its nightlife, and for having been the main hub of the movida countercultural movement in the 1970s and 1980s. Considered very popular and one of the best´s Madrid´s neighbourhoods with available pubs and bars during night.

=== Ópera ===
As the name implies, this area around the Ópera metro stop is the location of Madrid's main Opera Theatre, the Teatro Real (Royal Theatre). In front of the theatre is the Palacio Real de Madrid, or Royal Palace. The Royal Palace is no longer used as a residence, but it has been kept intact, serving as a cultural monument that is occasionally used for state functions. It is one of largest palaces in Europe, surpassing even the Versailles Palace.

=== Retiro ===
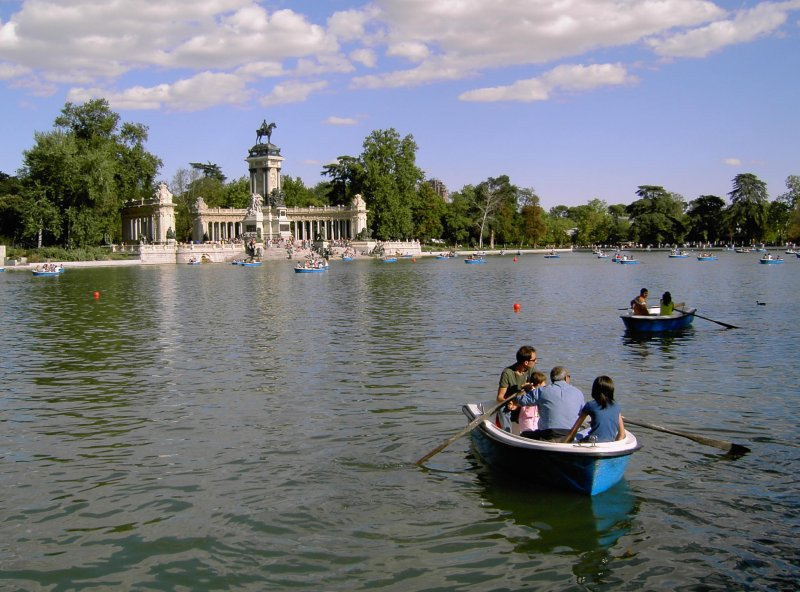
Parque del buen Retiro

Barrio Retiro is a classic neighbourhood surrounding the famous Buen Retiro Park, to the east of the center of the city. It is demographically the oldest neighbourhood in the city, but over the past five years the increasing number of flats for rent has been attracting young people and students to the area in growing numbers. The neighbourhood can be characterized by the style of its three most important areas. In the north, centering on Calle Ibiza, streets are in a grid pattern and buildings, normally 6-10 storeys, are packed closely together, creating a bustling atmosphere of small shops, bars, and restaurants. This area is very similar to the neighbouring Salamanca district. In the south, called Niño Jesus, the area is quieter, more spacious, and residential. In the west, the Jerónimos area, with its 18th and 19th century buildings and many museums (including the Museo del Prado), has few private residences, its large flats that often surpass 200 m^{2} (2,150 sq ft) being mainly used for offices.

=== Hortaleza ===
A residential district in the north, Hortaleza includes the headquarters of the Spanish Olympic Committee, the IFEMA (Madrid's main trade fair centre) and Juan Carlos I Park, a park between Campo de las Naciones (commercial district) and Barajas. Mar de Cristal is a tube station in Hortaleza district with an airport connection.

=== Vallecas ===
Vallecas is a working-class residential neighbourhood in the south of Madrid. It is also home to the Rayo Vallecano football team.

=== Aravaca ===
Aravaca is an upper-class residential suburb in the northwest of Madrid. During the Spanish Civil War the front was stabilized here for almost three years. Aravaca and its surroundings include parkland and wooded areas such as Casa de Campo.
