= Abrantes (Madrid) =

Coordinates: 40°22′50″N 3°43′26″W

- City neighborhood
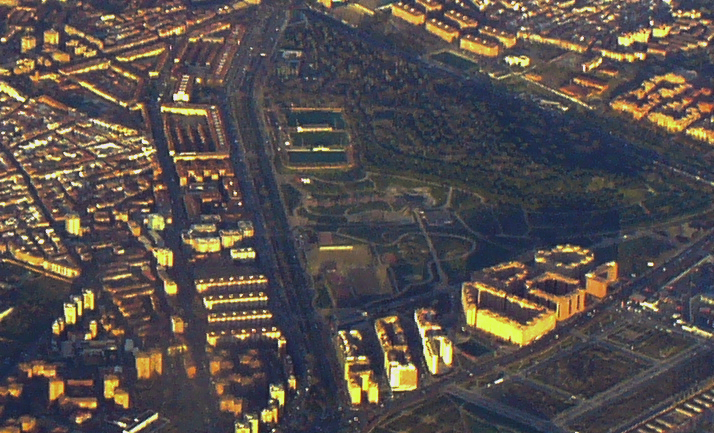
- Interactive map of Abrantes
- Country: Spain
- Region: Community of Madrid
- Municipality: Madrid
- District: Carabanchel

Area
  - Total: 1.564207 km^{2} (0.603944 sq mi)

Population (2020)
  - Total: 32,145
  - Density: 20,550/km^{2} (53,225/sq mi)

Abrantes is an administrative neighborhood (barrio) of Madrid belonging to the district of Carabanchel. It has an area of 1.564207 km^{2} (0.603944 sq mi). As of 1 February 2020, it as a population of 32,145. The Emperatriz María de Austria Park, 0.597458 km^{2} (0.230680 sq mi) in size, spreads across a large part of the neighborhood.
