= Apóstol Santiago =

Coordinates: 40°28′35″N 3°39′29″W

- Ward of Madrid
- Interactive map of Apóstol Santiago
- Country: Spain
- Aut. community: Community of Madrid
- Municipality: Madrid
- District: Hortaleza

Apóstol Santiago is a ward (barrio) of Madrid, the capital city of Spain. The ward belongs to the district of Hortaleza.
