= Salvador (Madrid) =

Coordinates: 40°26′40″N 3°37′59″W

- City neighborhood
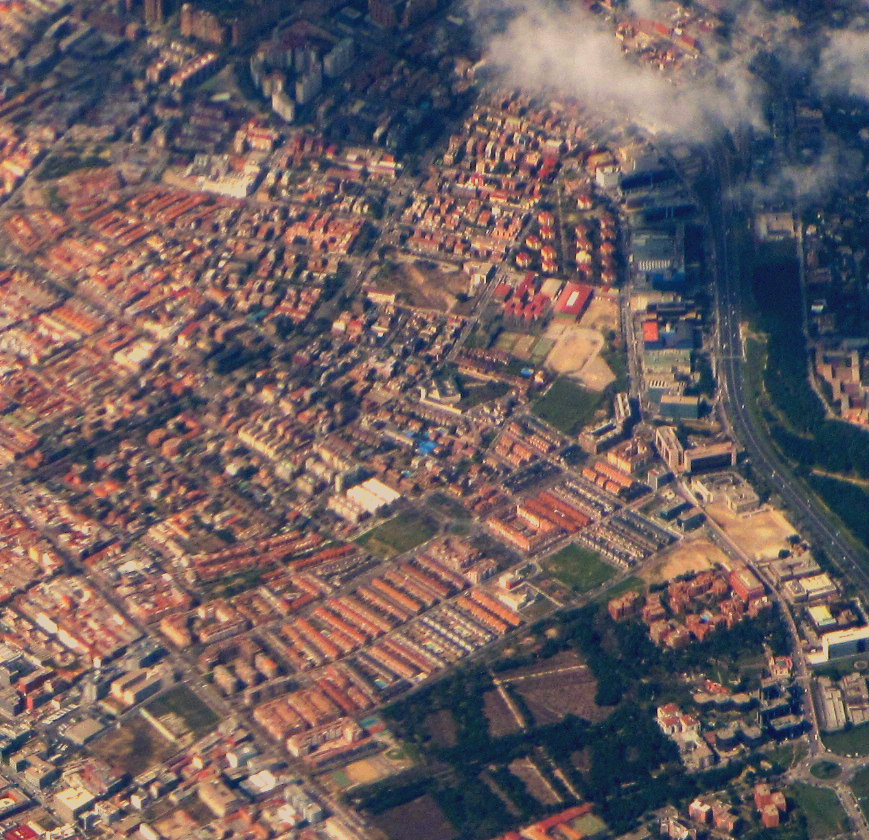

- Country: Spain
- Aut. community: Community of Madrid
- Municipality: Madrid
- District: San Blas-Canillejas

Area
  - Total: 1.881765 km^{2} (0.726554 sq mi)

Population (2020)
  - Total: 11,516
  - Density: 6,119.8/km^{2} (15,850/sq mi)

Salvador is an administrative neighborhood (barrio) of Madrid belonging to the district of San Blas-Canillejas. It has an area of 1.881765 km^{2} (0.726554 sq mi). As of 1 February 2020, it has a population of 11,516.
