= Orcasitas =

Coordinates: 40°22′7″N 3°42′43″W

- Ward of Madrid
- Country: Spain
- Aut. community: Madrid
- Municipality: Madrid
- District: Usera

Orcasitas is a ward (barrio) of Madrid belonging to the district of Usera.
