= Puerta Bonita (Madrid) =

Coordinates: 40°22′55″N 3°44′11″W

- City neighborhood
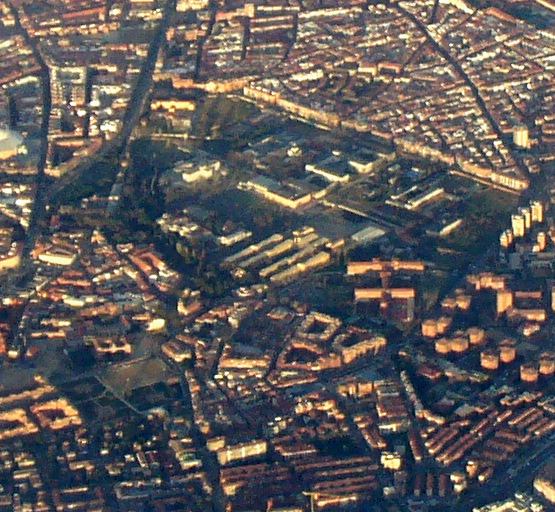

- Country: Spain
- Region: Community of Madrid
- Municipality: Madrid
- District: Carabanchel

Area
  - Total: 1.607994 km^{2} (0.620850 sq mi)

Population (2020)
  - Total: 36,157
  - Density: 22,486/km^{2} (58,238/sq mi)

Puerta Bonita is an administrative neighborhood (barrio) of Madrid belonging to the district of Carabanchel. It has an area of 1.607994 km^{2} (0.620850 sq mi). With an area of 0.45 km^{2} (0.17 sq mi), the Quinta of Vistalegre (a former Royal Site), which is chiefly owned by the regional administration, spreads over much of the neighborhood. The name of the neighborhood (Spanish for "beautiful gate") comes from a former iron gate of the quinta, which was accidentally destroyed in 1982. As of 1 February 2020, it has a population of 36,157.
