= Simancas (Madrid) =

Coordinates: 40°25′41″N 3°37′31″W

- City neighborhood
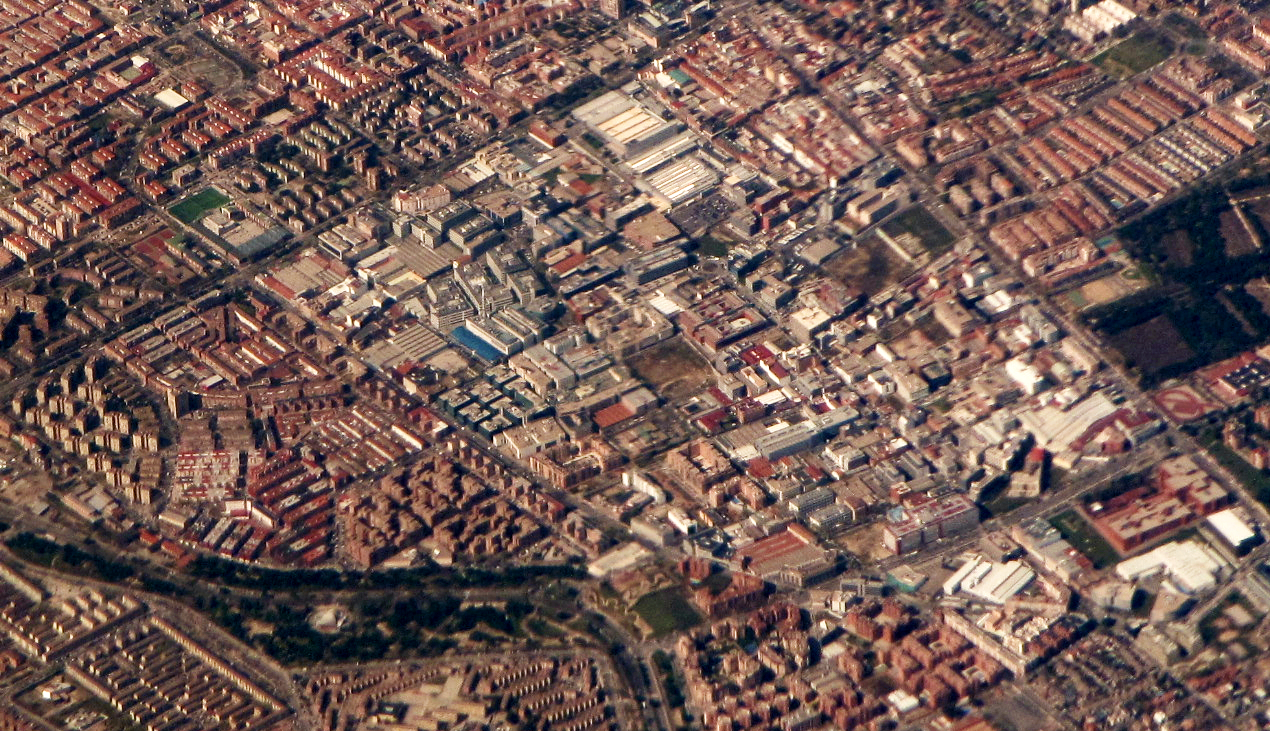

- Country: Spain
- Region: Community of Madrid
- Municipality: Madrid
- District: San Blas-Canillejas

Area
  - Total: 2.278418 km^{2} (0.879702 sq mi)

Population (2020)
  - Total: 28,799
  - Density: 12,640/km^{2} (32,737/sq mi)

Simancas is an administrative neighborhood (barrio) of Madrid belonging to the district of San Blas-Canillejas. It has an area of 2.278418 km^{2} (0.879702 sq mi). As of 1 February 2020, it has a population of 28,799.
