= Santa Eugenia (Madrid) =

Coordinates: 40°23′0″N 3°36′41″W

- City neighborhood
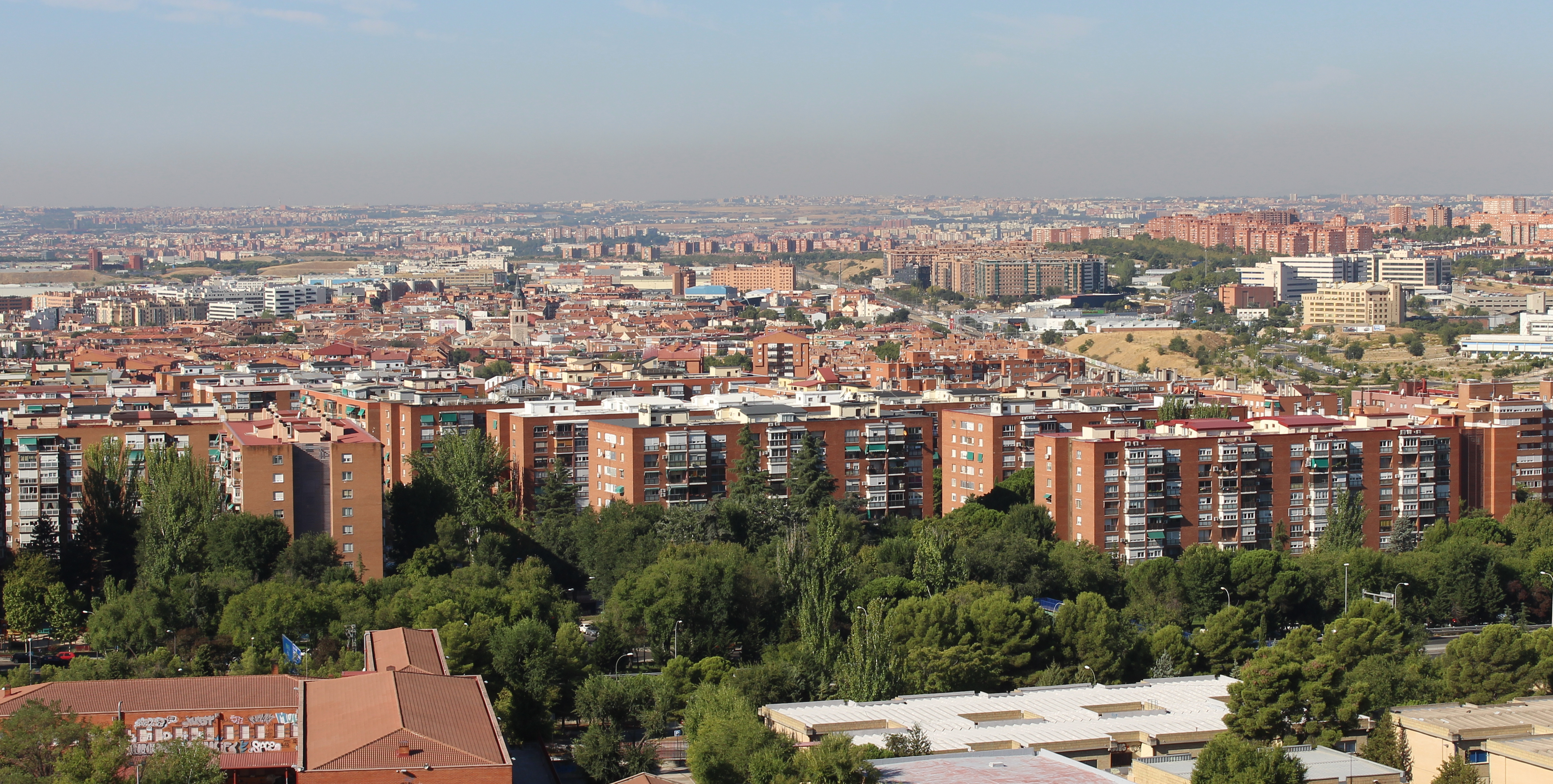

- Country: Spain
- Region: Community of Madrid
- Municipality: Madrid
- District: Villa de Vallecas

Area
  - Total: 2.070637 km^{2} (0.799477 sq mi)

Population (2020)
  - Total: 24,782
  - Density: 11,968/km^{2} (30,998/sq mi)

Santa Eugenia is an administrative neighborhood (barrio) of Madrid belonging to the district of Villa de Vallecas. It has an area of 2.070637 km^{2} (0.799477 sq mi). As of 1 March 2020, it has a population of 24,782. The Hospital Universitario Infanta Leonor is located in the neighborhood.
