= Arcos (Madrid) =

Coordinates: 40°25′26″N 3°36′47″W

- City neighborhood
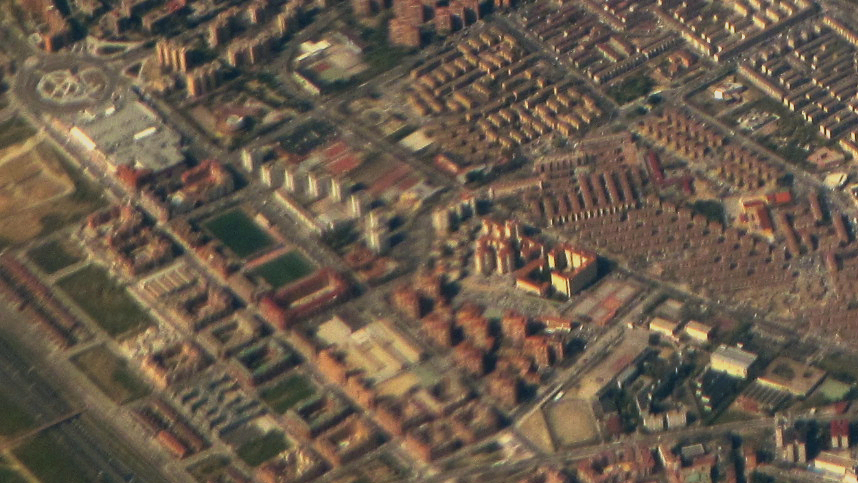
- Interactive map of Arcos
- Country: Spain
- Region: Community of Madrid
- Municipality: Madrid
- District: San Blas-Canillejas

Area
  - Total: 1.305192 km^{2} (0.503937 sq mi)

Population (2020)
  - Total: 24,902
  - Density: 19,079/km^{2} (49,415/sq mi)

Arcos is an administrative neighborhood (barrio) of Madrid belonging to the district of San Blas-Canillejas.

It has an area of 1.305192 km^{2} (0.503937 sq mi). As of 1 March 2020, it has a population of 24,902.
