= Canillas (Madrid) =

Coordinates: 40°27′35″N 3°38′44″W

- Ward of Madrid
- Interactive map of Canillas
- Country: Spain
- Aut. community: Madrid
- Municipality: Madrid
- District: Hortaleza

Canillas is a ward (barrio) of Madrid, Spain, and belongs to the district of Hortaleza. It is also home to Parroquia de Santa Paula (Parish of Saint Paula).
