= Numancia (Madrid) =

Coordinates: 40°24′3″N 3°39′47″W

- City neighborhood
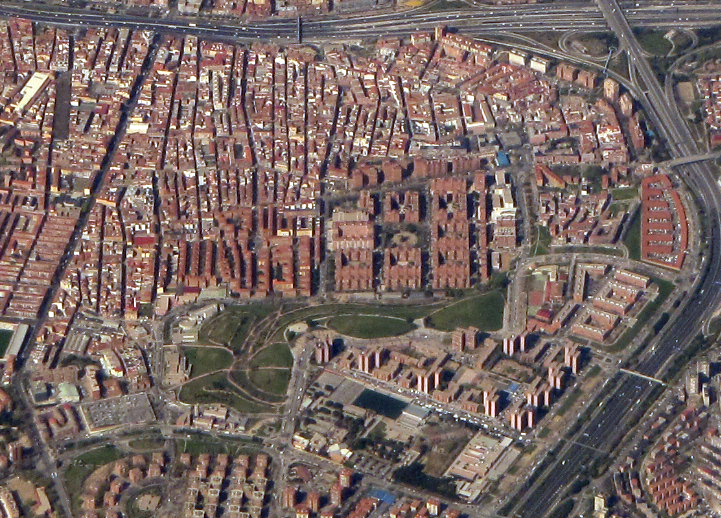

- Country: Spain
- Region: Community of Madrid
- Municipality: Madrid
- District: Ciudad Lineal

Area
  - Total: 1.849172 km^{2} (0.713969 sq mi)

Population (2020)
  - Total: 48,815
  - Density: 26,398/km^{2} (68,371/sq mi)

Numancia is an administrative neighborhood (barrio) of Madrid belonging to the district of Puente de Vallecas.

It has an area of 1.849172 km^{2} (0.713969 sq mi). As of 1 March 2020, it has a population of 48,815.
