= Casco Histórico de Barajas =

Coordinates: 40°28′25″N 3°34′38″W

- City neighborhood
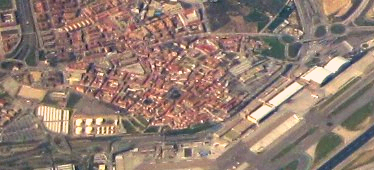

- Country: Spain
- Region: Community of Madrid
- Municipality: Madrid
- District: Barajas

Area
  - Total: 0.609202 km^{2} (0.235214 sq mi)

Population (2020)
  - Total: 7,735
  - Density: 12,700/km^{2} (32,880/sq mi)

Casco Histórico de Barajas is an administrative neighborhood (barrio) of Madrid belonging to the district of Barajas. It has an area of 0.609202 km^{2} (0.235214 sq mi). As of 1 February 2020, it has a population of 7,735.
