= Horcajo (Madrid) =

Coordinates: 40°24′41″N 3°37′37″W

- City neighborhood
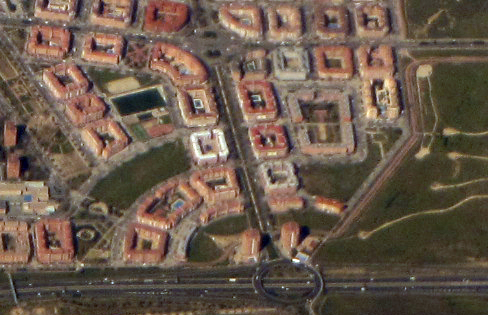

- Country: Spain
- Region: Community of Madrid
- Municipality: Madrid
- District: Moratalaz

Area
  - Total: 0.745503 km^{2} (0.287840 sq mi)

Population (2020)
  - Total: 6,453
  - Density: 8,656/km^{2} (22,420/sq mi)

Horcajo is an administrative neighborhood (barrio) of Madrid belonging to the district of Moratalaz. It has an area of 0.745503 km^{2} (0.287840 sq mi). As of 1 February 2020, it has a population of 6,453.
