= Puerta del Ángel =

Coordinates: 40°24′43″N 3°43′47″W

- Ward of Madrid
- Country: Spain
- Aut. community: Madrid
- Municipality: Madrid
- District: Latina

Puerta del Ángel [ˈpweɾta ðel ˈaŋxel] is a neighborhood (barrio) of Madrid belonging to the district of Latina.
