= Palomeras Bajas =

Coordinates: 40°23′14″N 3°39′26″W

- City neighborhood
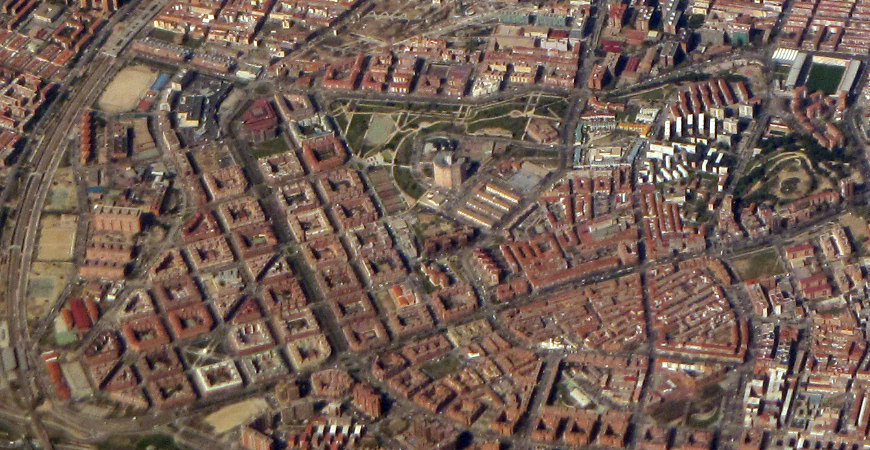

- Country: Spain
- Aut. community: Community of Madrid
- Municipality: Madrid
- District: Puente de Vallecas

Area
  - Total: 1.724430 km^{2} (0.665806 sq mi)

Population (2020)
  - Total: 41,034
  - Density: 23,796/km^{2} (61,631/sq mi)

Palomeras Bajas is an administrative neighborhood (barrio) of Madrid belonging to the district of Puente de Vallecas. It has an area of 1.724430 km^{2} (0.665806 sq mi). As of 1 February 2020, it has a population of 41,034. The seat of the Assembly of Madrid, the regional legislature of the Community of Madrid, is located in the neighborhood.
