= Villaverde Alto (Madrid) =

Coordinates: 40°20′52″N 3°42′42″W

- Ward of Madrid
- Country: Spain
- Aut. community: Community of Madrid
- Municipality: Madrid
- District: Villaverde

Villaverde Alto, casco histórico de Villaverde, or just Villaverde Alto is a ward (barrio) of Madrid, the capital city of Spain. The ward belongs to the district of Villaverde.
