= Rejas =

Coordinates: 40°26′37″N 3°35′42″W

- City neighborhood
- Country: Spain
- Aut. community: Community of Madrid
- Municipality: Madrid
- District: San Blas-Canillejas

Area
  - Total: 5.01573218 km^{2} (1.93658502 sq mi)

Population (2017)
  - Total: 15,775
  - Density: 3,145.1/km^{2} (8,145.8/sq mi)

Rejas is an administrative neighborhood (barrio) of Madrid belonging to the district of San Blas-Canillejas.
