= Timón (Madrid) =

Coordinates: 40°28′36″N 3°36′51″W

- Ward of Madrid
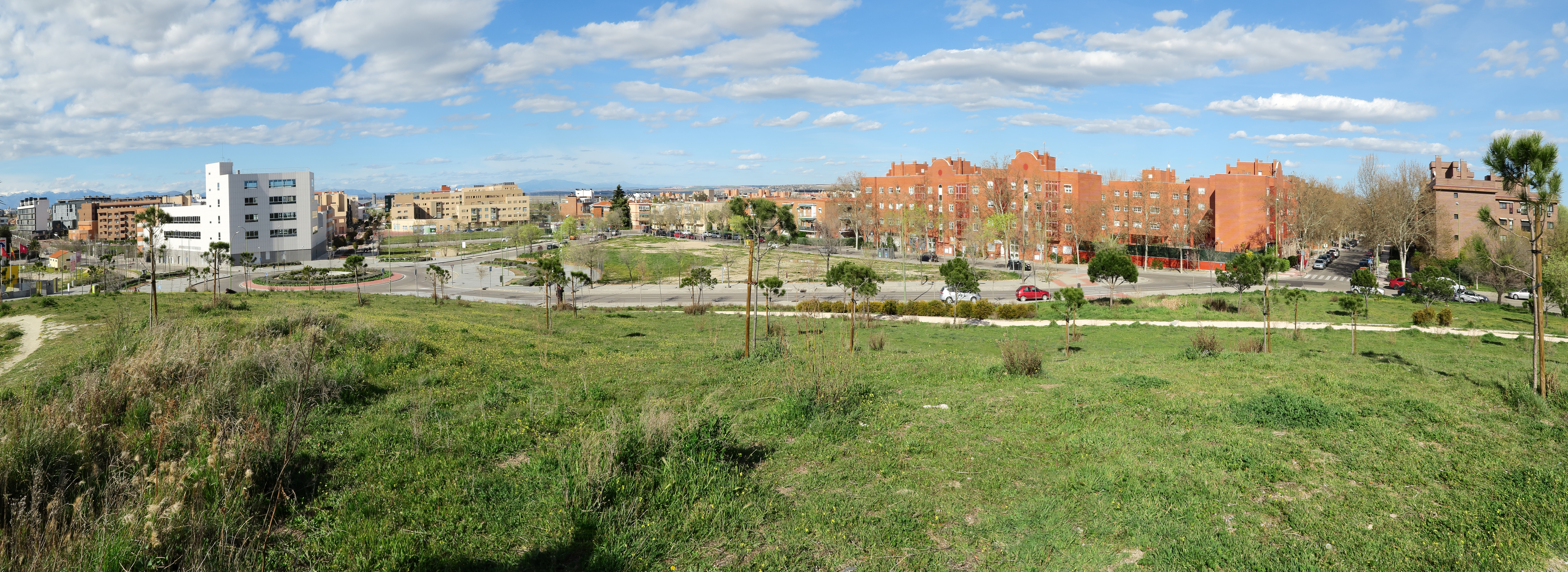
- Park in Timón

- Timón in Barajas district
- Country: Spain
- Aut. community: Madrid
- Municipality: Madrid
- District: Barajas

Timón is a ward (barrio) of Madrid belonging to the district of Barajas.
