= Pueblo Nuevo (Madrid) =

Coordinates: 40°25′31″N 3°38′7″W

- City neighborhood
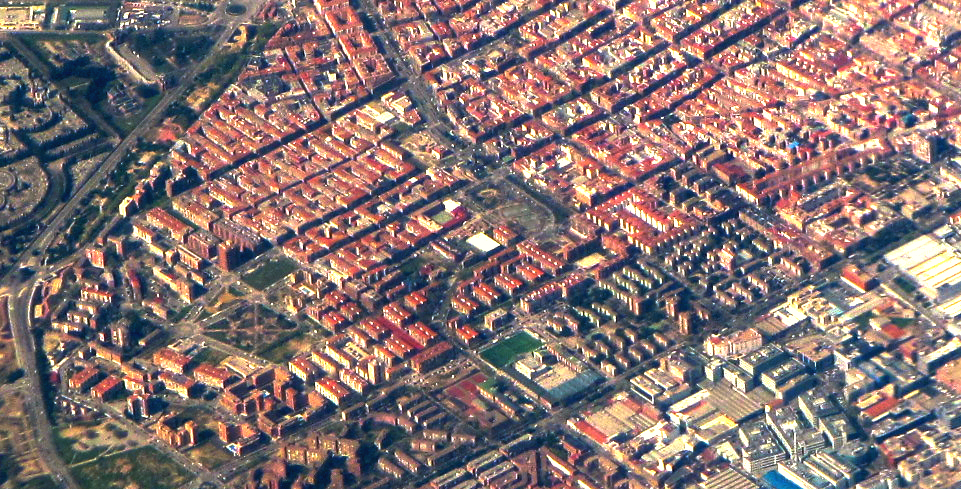

- Country: Spain
- Region: Community of Madrid
- Municipality: Madrid
- District: Ciudad Lineal

Area
  - Total: 2.319230 km^{2} (0.895460 sq mi)

Population (2020)
  - Total: 63,930
  - Density: 27,570/km^{2} (71,390/sq mi)

Pueblo Nuevo is an administrative neighborhood (barrio) of Madrid belonging to the district of Ciudad Lineal.

It has an area of 2.319230 km^{2} (0.895460 sq mi). As of 1 March 2020, it has a population of 63,930.

== See also ==
- Pueblo Nuevo (Madrid Metro)
