= List of neighborhoods of Madrid =

Madrid, the capital city of Spain, is divided into 21 districts (distritos), which are further subdivided into 131 neighborhoods (barrios).

== List ==
District name (number)	District location	Number	Name	Image
Centro (1)		11	Palacio	
Centro (1)		12	Embajadores	
Centro (1)		13	Cortes	
Centro (1)		14	Justicia	
Centro (1)		15	Universidad	
Centro (1)		16	Sol	
Arganzuela (2)		21	Imperial	
Arganzuela (2)		22	Acacias	
Arganzuela (2)		23	La Chopera	
Arganzuela (2)		24	Legazpi	
Arganzuela (2)		25	Delicias	
Arganzuela (2)		26	Palos de la Frontera	
Arganzuela (2)		27	Atocha	
Retiro (3)		31	Pacífico	
Retiro (3)		32	Adelfas	
Retiro (3)		33	Estrella	
Retiro (3)		34	Ibiza	
Retiro (3)		35	Los Jerónimos	
Retiro (3)		36	Niño Jesús	
Salamanca (4)		41	Recoletos	
Salamanca (4)		42	Goya	
Salamanca (4)		43	Fuente del Berro	
Salamanca (4)		44	Guindalera	
Salamanca (4)		45	Lista	
Salamanca (4)		46	Castellana	
Chamartín (5)		51	El Viso	
Chamartín (5)		52	Prosperidad	
Chamartín (5)		53	Ciudad Jardín	
Chamartín (5)		54	Hispanoamérica	
Chamartín (5)		55	Nueva España	
Chamartín (5)		56	Castilla	
Tetuán (6)		61	Bellas Vistas	
Tetuán (6)		62	Cuatro Caminos	
Tetuán (6)		63	Castillejos	
Tetuán (6)		64	Almenara	
Tetuán (6)		65	Valdeacederas	
Tetuán (6)		66	Berruguete	
Chamberí (7)		71	Gaztambide	
Chamberí (7)		72	Arapiles	
Chamberí (7)		73	Trafalgar	
Chamberí (7)		74	Almagro	
Chamberí (7)		75	Ríos Rosas	
Chamberí (7)		76	Vallehermoso	
Fuencarral-El Pardo (8)		81	El Pardo	
Fuencarral-El Pardo (8)		82	Fuentelarreina	
Fuencarral-El Pardo (8)		83	Peñagrande	
Fuencarral-El Pardo (8)		84	El Pilar	
Fuencarral-El Pardo (8)		85	La Paz	
Fuencarral-El Pardo (8)		86	Valverde	
Fuencarral-El Pardo (8)		87	Mirasierra	
Fuencarral-El Pardo (8)		88	El Goloso	
Moncloa-Aravaca (9)		91	Casa de Campo	
Moncloa-Aravaca (9)		92	Argüelles	
Moncloa-Aravaca (9)		93	Ciudad Universitaria	
Moncloa-Aravaca (9)		94	Valdezarza	
Moncloa-Aravaca (9)		95	Valdemarín	
Moncloa-Aravaca (9)		96	El Plantío	
Moncloa-Aravaca (9)		97	Aravaca	
Latina (10)		101	Los Cármenes	
Latina (10)		102	Puerta del Ángel	
Latina (10)		103	Lucero	
Latina (10)		104	Aluche	
Latina (10)		105	Campamento	
Latina (10)		106	Cuatro Vientos	
Latina (10)		107	Las Águilas	
Carabanchel (11)		111	Comillas	
Carabanchel (11)		112	Opañel	
Carabanchel (11)		113	San Isidro	
Carabanchel (11)		114	Vista Alegre	
Carabanchel (11)		115	Puerta Bonita	
Carabanchel (11)		116	Buenavista	
Carabanchel (11)		117	Abrantes	
Usera (12)		121	Orcasitas	
Usera (12)		122	Orcasur	
Usera (12)		123	San Fermín	
Usera (12)		124	Almendrales	
Usera (12)		125	Moscardó	
Usera (12)		126	Zofío	
Usera (12)		127	Pradolongo	
Puente de Vallecas (13)		131	Entrevías	
Puente de Vallecas (13)		132	San Diego	
Puente de Vallecas (13)		133	Palomeras Bajas	
Puente de Vallecas (13)		134	Palomeras Sureste	
Puente de Vallecas (13)		135	Portazgo	
Puente de Vallecas (13)		136	Numancia	
Moratalaz (14)		141	Pavones	
Moratalaz (14)		142	Horcajo	
Moratalaz (14)		143	Marroquina	
Moratalaz (14)		144	Media Legua	
Moratalaz (14)		145	Fontarrón	
Moratalaz (14)		146	Vinateros	
Ciudad Lineal (15)		151	Ventas	
Ciudad Lineal (15)		152	Pueblo Nuevo	
Ciudad Lineal (15)		153	Quintana	
Ciudad Lineal (15)		154	Concepción	
Ciudad Lineal (15)		155	San Pascual	
Ciudad Lineal (15)		156	San Juan Bautista	
Ciudad Lineal (15)		157	Colina	
Ciudad Lineal (15)		158	Atalaya	
Ciudad Lineal (15)		159	Costillares	
Hortaleza (16)		161	Palomas	
Hortaleza (16)		162	Piovera	
Hortaleza (16)		163	Canillas	
Hortaleza (16)		164	Pinar del Rey	
Hortaleza (16)		165	Apóstol Santiago	
Hortaleza (16)		166	Valdefuentes	
Villaverde (17)		171	Villaverde Alto	
Villaverde (17)		172	San Cristóbal	
Villaverde (17)		173	Butarque	
Villaverde (17)		174	Los Rosales	
Villaverde (17)		175	Los Ángeles	
Villa de Vallecas (18)		181	Casco Histórico de Vallecas	
Villa de Vallecas (18)		182	Santa Eugenia	
Villa de Vallecas (18)		183	Ensanche de Vallecas	
Vicálvaro (19)		191	Casco Histórico de Vicálvaro	
Vicálvaro (19)		192	Valdebernardo	
Vicálvaro (19)		193	Valderrivas	
Vicálvaro (19)		194	El Cañaveral	
San Blas-Canillejas (20)		201	Simancas	
San Blas-Canillejas (20)		202	Hellín	
San Blas-Canillejas (20)		203	Amposta	
San Blas-Canillejas (20)		204	Arcos	
San Blas-Canillejas (20)		205	Rosas	
San Blas-Canillejas (20)		206	Rejas	
San Blas-Canillejas (20)		207	Canillejas	
San Blas-Canillejas (20)		208	El Salvador	
Barajas (21)		211	Alameda de Osuna	
Barajas (21)		212	Aeropuerto	
Barajas (21)		213	Casco Histórico de Barajas	
Barajas (21)		214	Timón	
Barajas (21)		215	Corralejos	
