= San Isidro (Madrid) =

Coordinates: 40°23′56″N 3°43′35″W

- City neighborhood
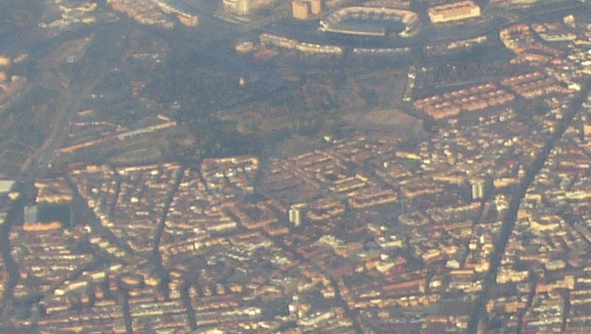

- Country: Spain
- Aut. community: Community of Madrid
- Municipality: Madrid
- District: Carabanchel

San Isidro is an administrative neighborhood (barrio) of Madrid belonging to the district of Carabanchel.
