= Goya (Madrid) =

Coordinates: 40°25′31″N 3°40′29″W

- City neighborhood
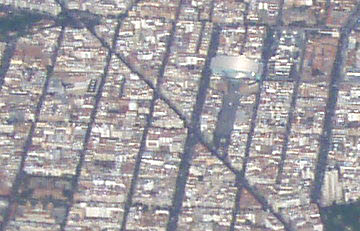

- Interactive map of Goya
- Country: Spain
- Region: Community of Madrid
- Municipality: Madrid
- District: Salamanca

Area
  - Total: 0.771228 km^{2} (0.297773 sq mi)

Population (2020)
  - Total: 30,010
  - Density: 38,910/km^{2} (100,800/sq mi)

Goya is an administrative neighborhood (barrio) of Madrid belonging to the district of Salamanca. It has an area of 0.771228 km^{2} (0.297773 sq mi). As of 1 March 2020, it has a population of 30,010. The WiZink Center is located in the neighborhood.
