= Media Legua =

Coordinates: 40°24′51″N 3°39′17″W

- City neighborhood
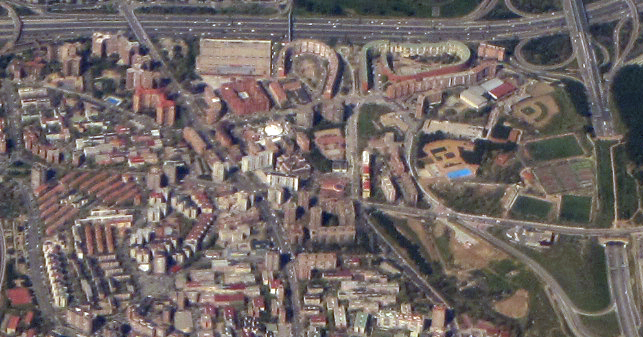
- Interactive map of Media Legua
- Country: Spain
- Region: Community of Madrid
- Municipality: Madrid
- District: Moratalaz

Area
  - Total: 0.999539 km^{2} (0.385924 sq mi)

Population (2020)
  - Total: 17,977
  - Density: 17,985/km^{2} (46,582/sq mi)

Media Legua is an administrative neighborhood (barrio) of Madrid belonging to the district of Moratalaz.

It has an area of 0.999539 km^{2} (0.385924 sq mi). As of 1 March 2020, it has a population of 17,977.
