= Hellín (Madrid) =

Coordinates: 40°25′49″N 3°37′8″W

- City neighborhood
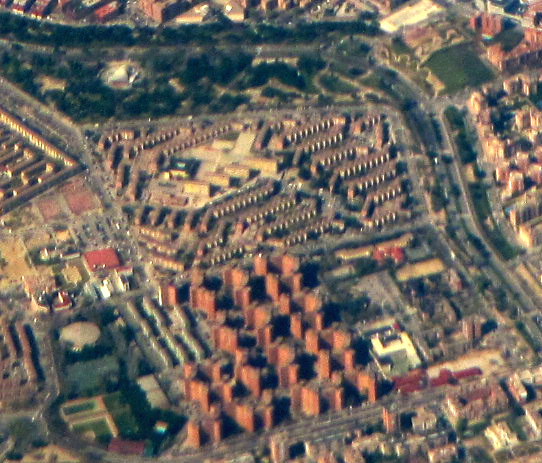
- Interactive map of Hellín
- Country: Spain
- Region: Community of Madrid
- Municipality: Madrid
- District: San Blas-Canillejas

Area
  - Total: 0.549031 km^{2} (0.211982 sq mi)

Population (2020)
  - Total: 9,403

Hellín is an administrative neighborhood (barrio) of Madrid belonging to the district of San Blas-Canillejas.

It has an area of 0.549031 km^{2} (0.211982 sq mi). As of 1 March 2020, it has a population of 9,403.
