= Valderrivas =

- City neighborhood
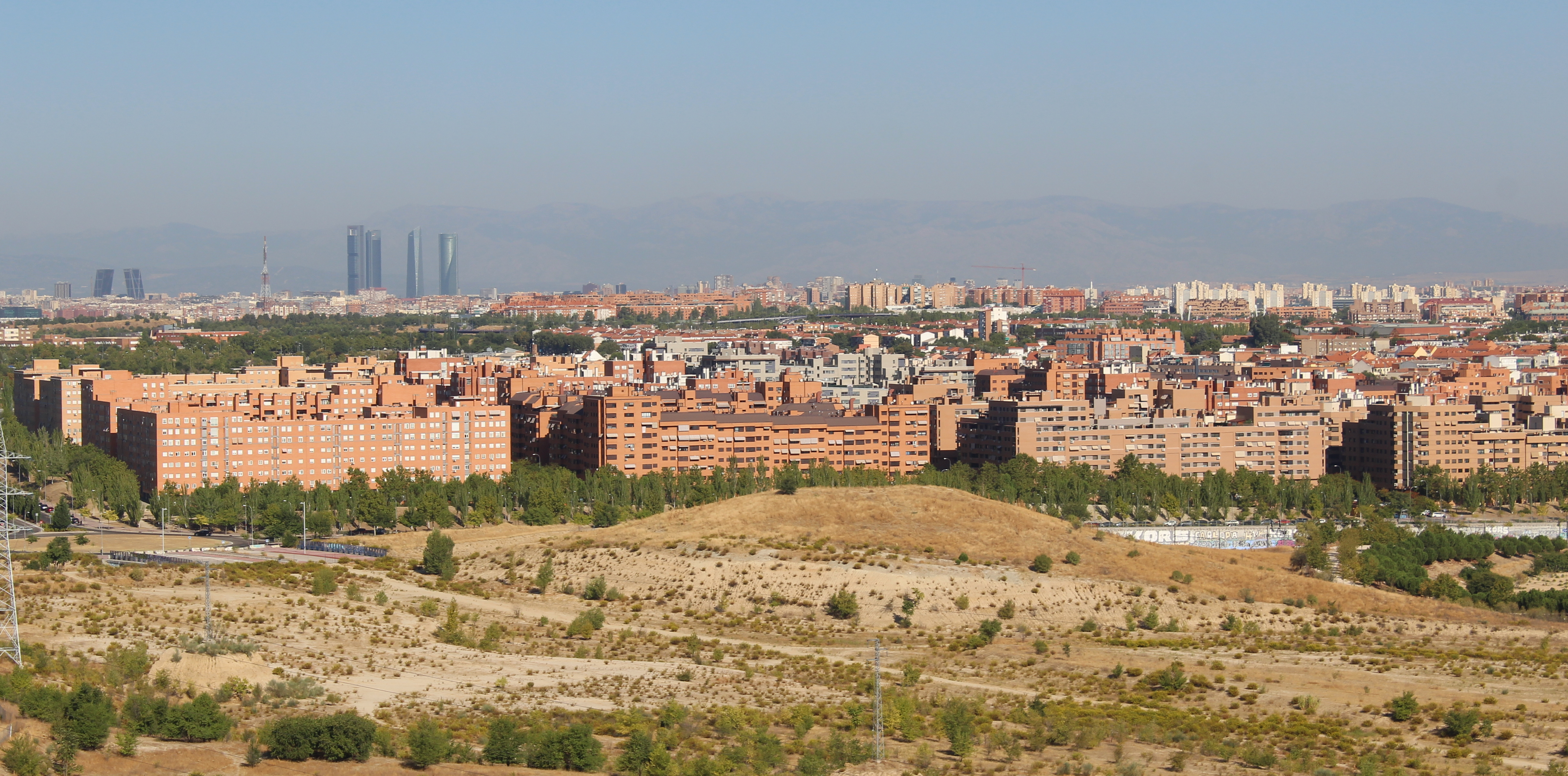

- Country: Spain
- Region: Community of Madrid
- Municipality: Madrid
- District: Vicálvaro

Population (2020)
  - Total: 18,175

Valderrivas (Note: Also written sometimes as "Valderribas".) is an administrative neighborhood of Madrid belonging to the district of Vicálvaro. It was formally constituted as independent entity in November 2017, after the administrative reorganization of the district passed by the Plenary of the Ayuntamiento de Madrid on 31 October 2017. The toponym Valderrivas (corresponding to the preexisting differentiate urban development) makes a reference to the former cement factory installed in the area named as Portland Valderrivas S. A.

As of 1 March 2020, it has a population of 18,175.
