= Pinar del Rey (Madrid) =

Coordinates: 40°27′53″N 3°39′20″W

- Ward of Madrid
- Country: Spain
- Aut. community: Community of Madrid
- Municipality: Madrid
- District: Hortaleza

Pinar del Rey is a ward (barrio) of Madrid, the capital city of Spain. The ward belongs to the district of Hortaleza.
