= Atalaya (Madrid) =

- Ward
- Interactive map of Atalaya
- Country: Spain
- Aut. community: Madrid
- Municipality: Madrid
- District: Ciudad Lineal

Atalaya is a ward (barrio) of Madrid belonging to the district of Ciudad Lineal.
