= Ibiza (Madrid) =

Coordinates: 40°25′8″N 3°40′27″W

- City neighborhood
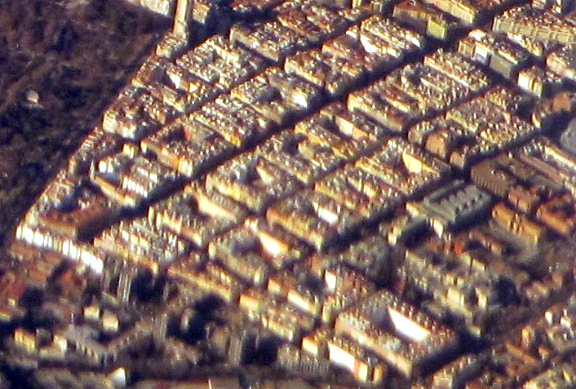
- Interactive map of Ibiza
- Country: Spain
- Region: Community of Madrid
- Municipality: Madrid
- District: Retiro

Area
  - Total: 0.49 km^{2} (0.19 sq mi)

Population (2020)
  - Total: 22,050
  - Density: 45,000/km^{2} (120,000/sq mi)

Ibiza is an administrative neighborhood (barrio) of Madrid belonging to the district of Retiro. It has an area of 0.49 km^{2} (0.19 sq mi). As of 1 February 2020, it has a population of 22,050. The building complex of the Hospital General Universitario Gregorio Marañón is located in the neighborhood.
