= Pacífico (Madrid) =

Coordinates: 40°24′17″N 3°40′33″W

- City neighborhood
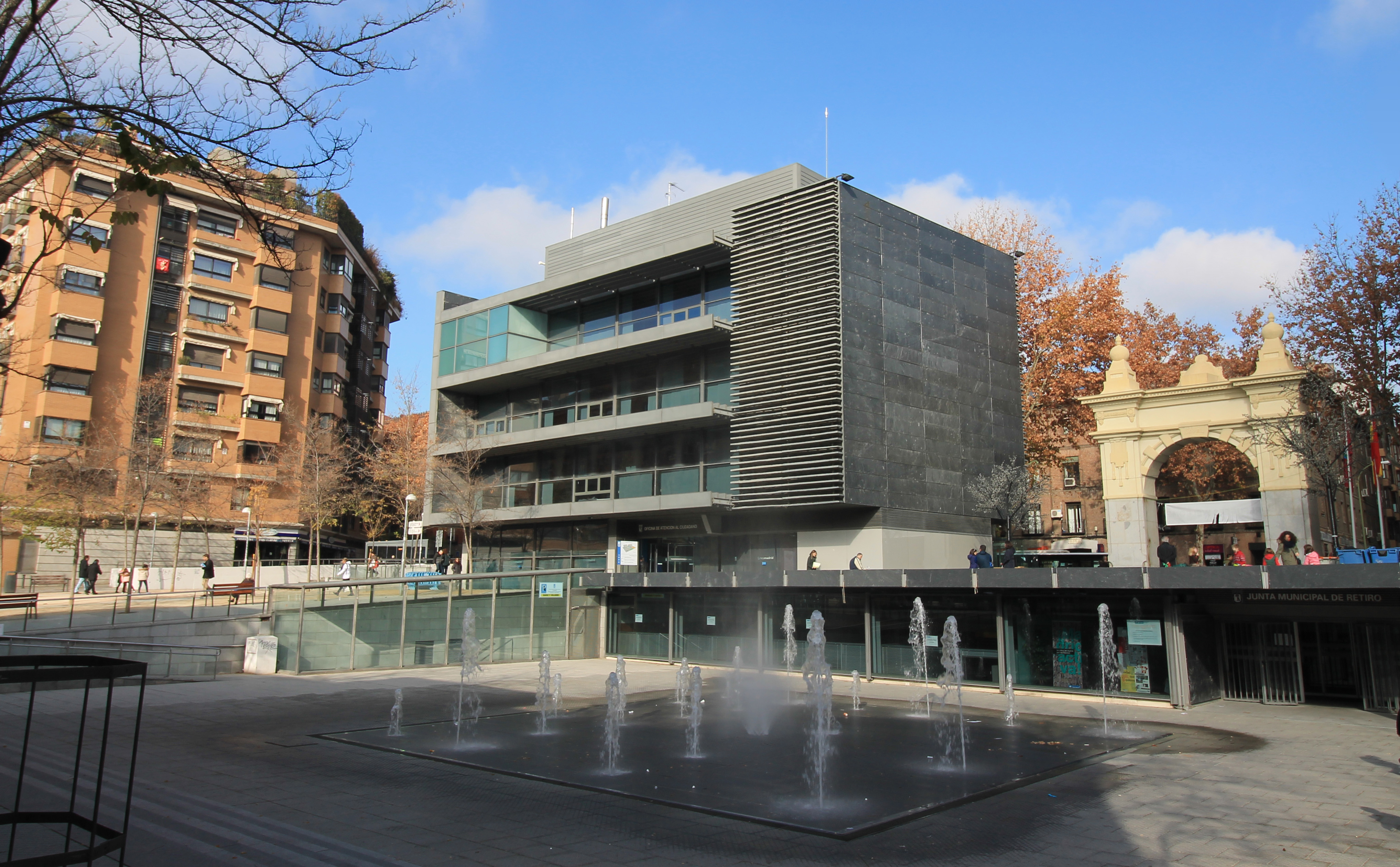

- Country: Spain
- Aut. community: Community of Madrid
- Municipality: Madrid
- District: Retiro

Pacífico is an administrative neighborhood (barrio) of Madrid belonging to the district of Retiro.
