= El Pilar (Madrid) =

Ward in Madrid, Spain

Coordinates: 40°28′37″N 3°42′45″W

- Ward of Madrid
- Country: Spain
- Aut. community: Madrid
- Municipality: Madrid
- District: Fuencarral-El Pardo

El Pilar is a ward (barrio) of Madrid, the capital of Spain, belonging to the district of Fuencarral-El Pardo.
