= Valdebernardo =

Coordinates: 40°23′47″N 3°37′00″W

- City neighborhood
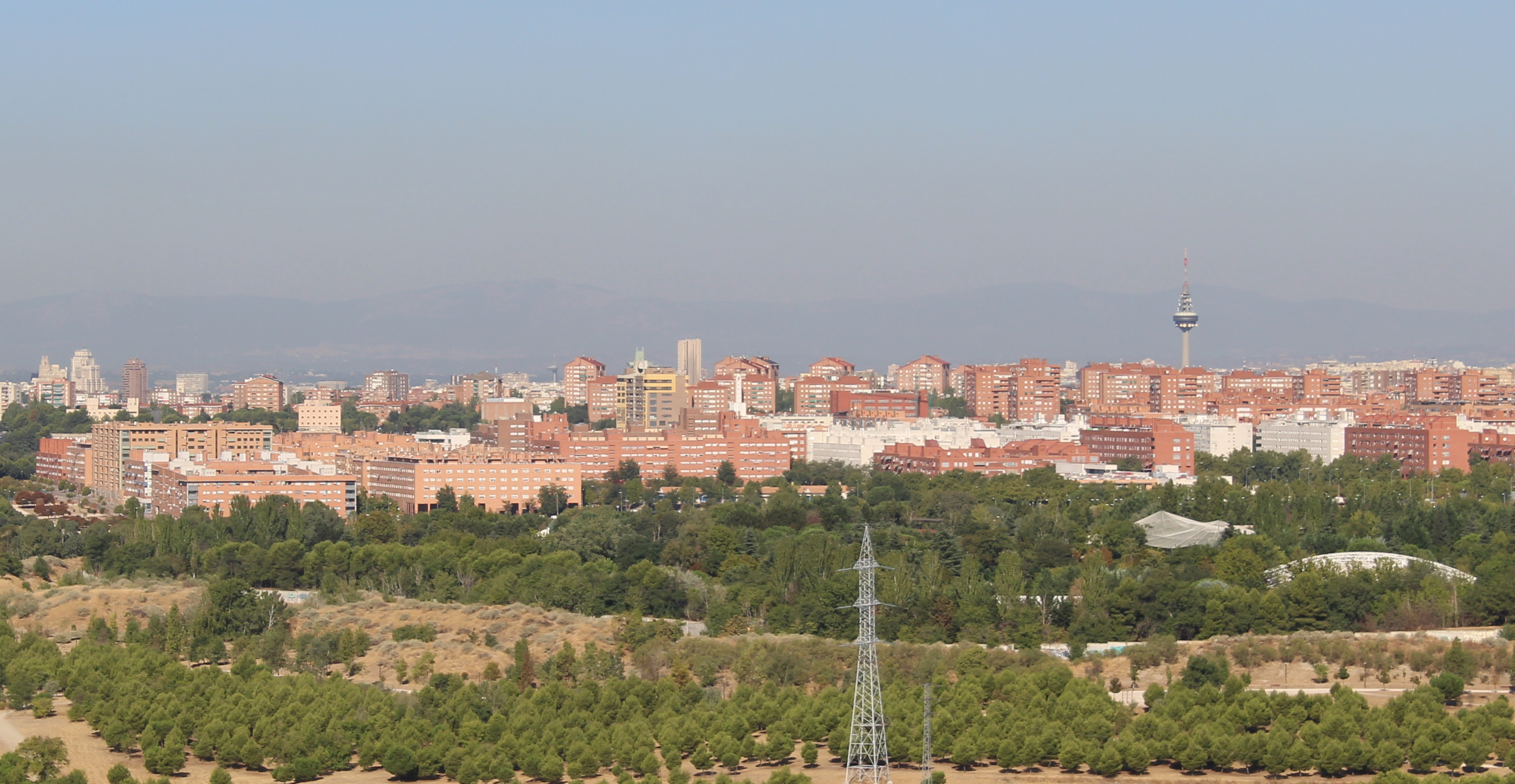

- Country: Spain
- Region: Community of Madrid
- Municipality: Madrid
- District: Vicálvaro

Area
  - Total: 2.354258 km^{2} (0.908984 sq mi)

Population (2020)
  - Total: 17,851
  - Density: 7,582.4/km^{2} (19,638/sq mi)

Valdebernardo [baldeβeɾˈnaɾðo] is an administrative neighborhood (barrio) of Madrid belonging to the district of Vicálvaro.

It was formally constituted as independent entity in 2017, after the administrative reorganization of the district carried out by the Ayuntamiento de Madrid. The urbanization planning, the so-called PAU (Programa de Actuación Urbanística) dates back to the 1980s, and it was assumed by the regional administration in 1989. There was a project to erect a 92 m high monumental armillary sphere in the neighborhood, yet the project failed to materialize. Two perpendicular boulevards (Indalecio Prieto and José Prat) conform the spine of the area. It has an area of 2.354258 km^{2} (0.908984 sq mi). As of 1 February 2020, it has a population of 17,851.
