= Amposta (Madrid) =

Coordinates: 40°25′49″N 3°37′10″W

- City neighborhood
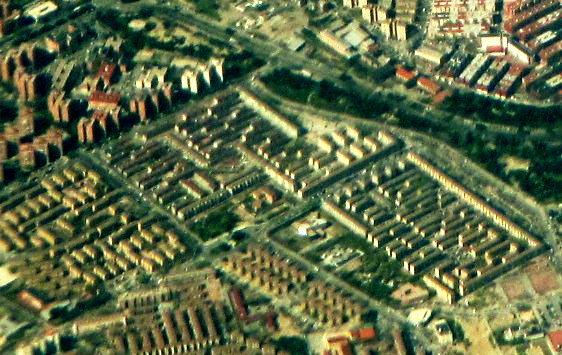
- Interactive map of Amposta
- Country: Spain
- Region: Community of Madrid
- Municipality: Madrid
- District: San Blas-Canillejas

Area
  - Total: 0.370250 km^{2} (0.142954 sq mi)

Population (2020)
  - Total: 8,971
  - Density: 24,230/km^{2} (62,750/sq mi)

Amposta is an administrative neighborhood (barrio) of Madrid belonging to the district of San Blas-Canillejas.

It has an area of 0.370250 km^{2} (0.142954 sq mi). As of 1 March 2020, it has a population of 8,971.
