= Canillejas =

City neighborhood in Madrid, Spain

Coordinates: 40°27′N 3°37′W

- City neighborhood
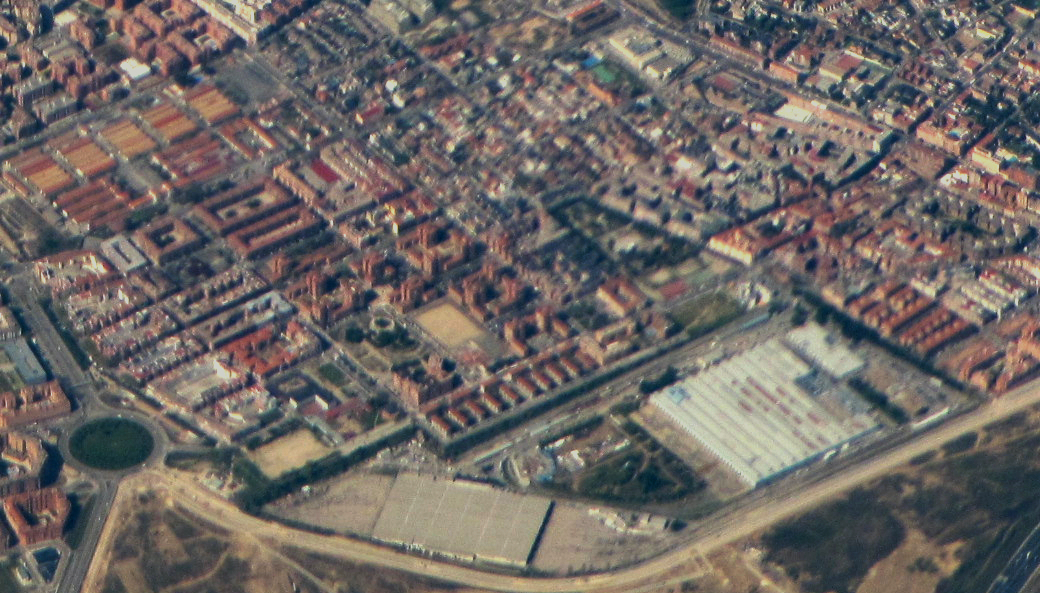
- Interactive map of Canillejas
- Country: Spain
- Region: Community of Madrid
- Municipality: Madrid
- District: San Blas-Canillejas

Area
  - Total: 1.598075 km^{2} (0.617020 sq mi)

Population (2020)
  - Total: 29,288
  - Density: 18,327/km^{2} (47,467/sq mi)

Canillejas is an administrative neighborhood (barrio) of Madrid, belonging to the San Blas-Canillejas district. It is named after the former namesake municipality, absorbed by Madrid in 1949. It has an area of 1.598075 km^{2} (0.617020 sq mi). As of 1 March 2020, it has a population of 29,288.

== Overview ==
Canillejas is a middle class area and is close to the Barajas Airport. It has grown extensively in recent decades. It was the last suburb before reaching the Campos (countryside), but has since been flanked by new growth. Heading towards the center of the city, its main street becomes the Calle De Alcalá, which has many of Madrid's landmarks, including the bullring, Retiro Park and eventually ending in Puerta del Sol.

It is also the site of Santa María la Blanca church which is notable especially for fine wooden lattice ceilings carved in the mid-16th century in the Mudéjar style, which were hidden under a plaster vault for hundreds of years and were uncovered in 2020.

The Fiestas de Canillejas takes place from 1 to 8 September.
