= Palomas (Madrid) =

Coordinates: 40°27′13″N 3°37′5″W

- Ward of Madrid
- Country: Spain
- Aut. community: Madrid
- Municipality: Madrid
- District: Hortaleza

Palomas is a ward (barrio) of Madrid, the capital city of Spain. The ward belongs to the district of Hortaleza.
