= Lista (Madrid) =

Coordinates: 40°25′58″N 3°40′28″W

- City neighborhood
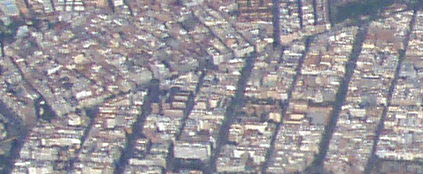

- Interactive map of Lista
- Country: Spain
- Region: Community of Madrid
- Municipality: Madrid
- District: Salamanca

Area
  - Total: 0.520399 km^{2} (0.200927 sq mi)

Population (2020)
  - Total: 21,362
  - Density: 41,049/km^{2} (106,320/sq mi)

Lista is an administrative neighborhood (barrio) of Madrid belonging to the district of Salamanca. It has an area of 0.520399 km^{2} (0.200927 sq mi). As of 1 March 2020, it has a population of 21,362. The Hospital Universitario de la Princesa is located in the neighborhood.
