= Corralejos =

City neighborhood in Madrid, Spain

Coordinates: 40°27′52″N 3°35′24″W

- City neighborhood
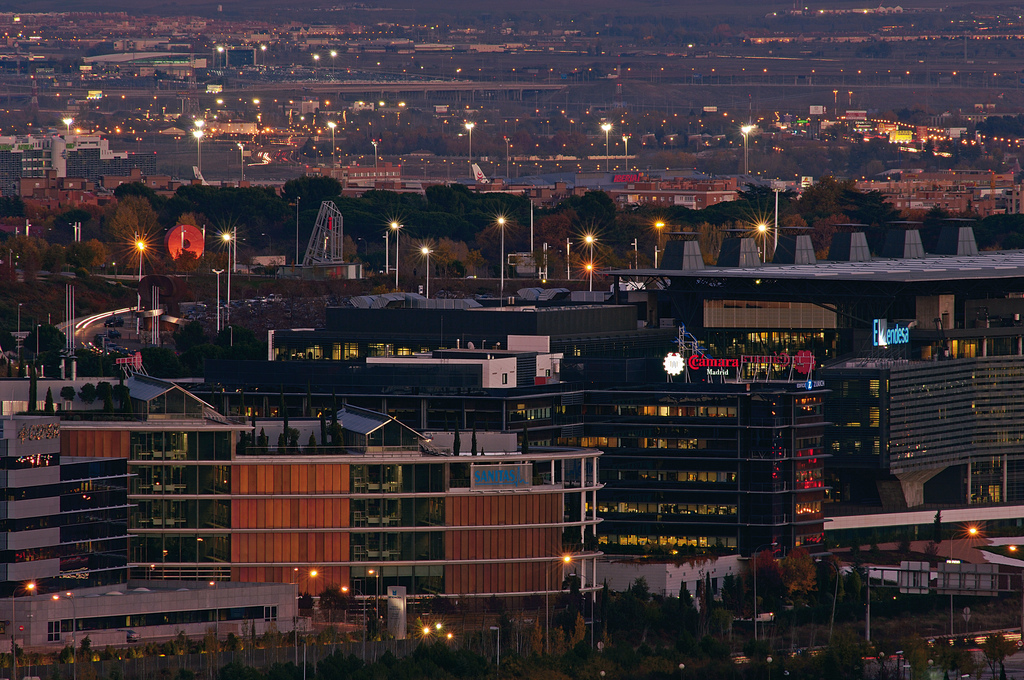

- Corralejos in Madrid
- Country: Spain
- Region: Community of Madrid
- Municipality: Madrid
- District: Barajas

Area
  - Total: 4.633048 km^{2} (1.788830 sq mi)

Population (2020)
  - Total: 7,808
  - Density: 1,685/km^{2} (4,365/sq mi)

Corralejos is a neighborhood (barrio) of Madrid belonging to the district of Barajas.

It has an area of 4.633048 km^{2} (1.788830 sq mi). As of 1 February 2020, it has a population of 7,808. The neighborhood hosts the IFEMA fair facilities and the Palacio de Congresos, as well as the Juan Carlos I Park.
