= Colina (Madrid) =

Coordinates: 40°27′24″N 3°39′43″W

- Ward of Madrid
- Interactive map of Colina
- Country: Spain
- Aut. community: Madrid
- Municipality: Madrid
- District: Ciudad Lineal

Colina is a ward (barrio) of Madrid belonging to the district of Ciudad Lineal.
