= Los Rosales (Madrid) =

Coordinates: 40°21′37″N 3°41′8″W

- Ward of Madrid
- Interactive map of Los Rosales
- Country: Spain
- Aut. community: Community of Madrid
- Municipality: Madrid
- District: Villaverde

Los Rosales is a ward (barrio) of Madrid, the capital of Spain. The barrio belongs to the district of Villaverde.
