= Buenavista (Madrid) =

Coordinates: 40°22′00″N 3°45′18″W

- Ward of Madrid
- Interactive map of Buenavista
- Country: Spain
- Aut. community: Madrid
- Municipality: Madrid
- District: Carabanchel

Buenavista is a ward (barrio) of Madrid belonging to the district of Carabanchel.
