= Rosas (Madrid) =

Coordinates: 40°26′10″N 3°35′58″W

- City neighborhood
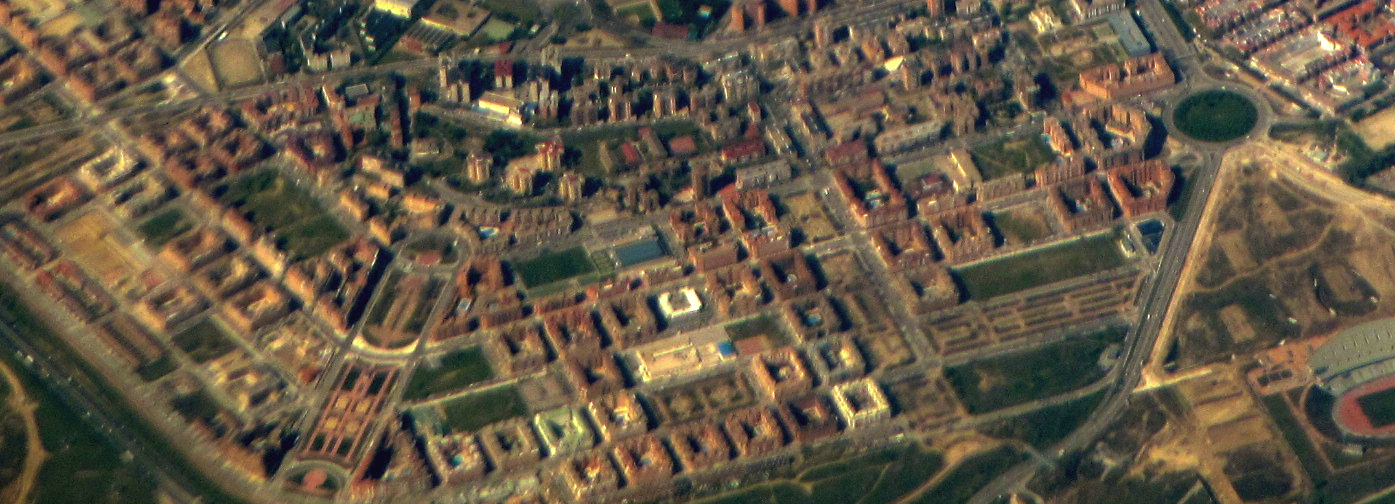
- Aerial view of the urbanised area

- Country: Spain
- Region: Community of Madrid
- Municipality: Madrid
- District: San Blas-Canillejas

Area
  - Total: 9.388024 km^{2} (3.624736 sq mi)

Population (2020)
  - Total: 31,953
  - Density: 3,403.6/km^{2} (8,815.3/sq mi)

Rosas (or Las Rosas) is an administrative neighborhood of Madrid belonging to the district of San Blas-Canillejas.

It comprises part of the Ensanche Este de San Blas, to the west of the M-40 as well as large non-urbanised plots to the east of the latter motorway, including a sepiolite extraction site, whose mining below the phreatic level has induced the formation of a series of small lagoons. The former athletics stadium known as La Peineta (currently the Metropolitano Stadium, the home football stadium of Atlético Madrid) is located in the neighborhood.

It has an area of 9.388024 km^{2} (3.624736 sq mi). As of 1 March 2020, it has a population of 31,953.
