= Valdefuentes (Madrid) =

Ward of Madrid, Spain

Coordinates: 40°29′26″N 3°37′26″W

- Ward of Madrid
- Country: Spain
- Aut. community: Community of Madrid
- Municipality: Madrid
- District: Hortaleza

Valdefuentes is a ward (barrio) of Madrid, Spain, belonging to the district of Hortaleza. It is a quiet, residential neighborhood in Hortaleza, with the Vaguada de la Oca Park and natural areas nearby.
