= Portazgo (Madrid) =

Coordinates: 40°23′33″N 3°38′59″W

- City neighborhood
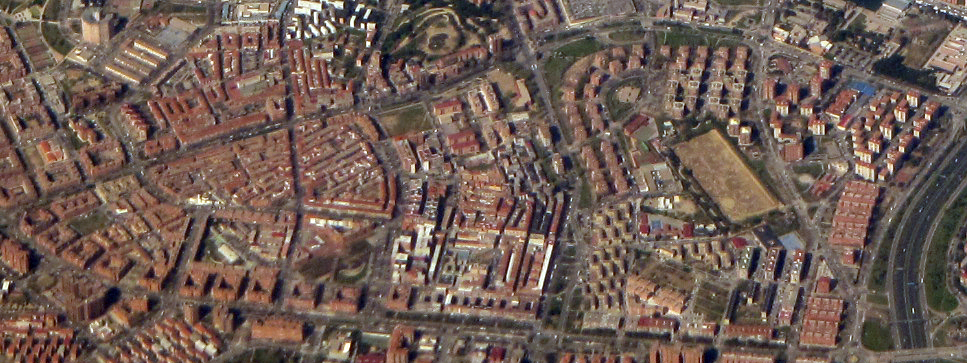

- Country: Spain
- Region: Community of Madrid
- Municipality: Madrid
- District: Puente de Vallecas

Area
  - Total: 1.245274 km^{2} (0.480803 sq mi)

Population (2020)
  - Total: 29,094
  - Density: 23,364/km^{2} (60,511/sq mi)

Portazgo is an administrative neighborhood (barrio) of Madrid belonging to the district of Puente de Vallecas. It has an area of 1.245274 km^{2} (0.480803 sq mi). As of 1 February 2020, it has a population of 29,094.
