= San Diego (Madrid) =

Coordinates: 40°23′47″N 3°40′2″W

- City neighborhood
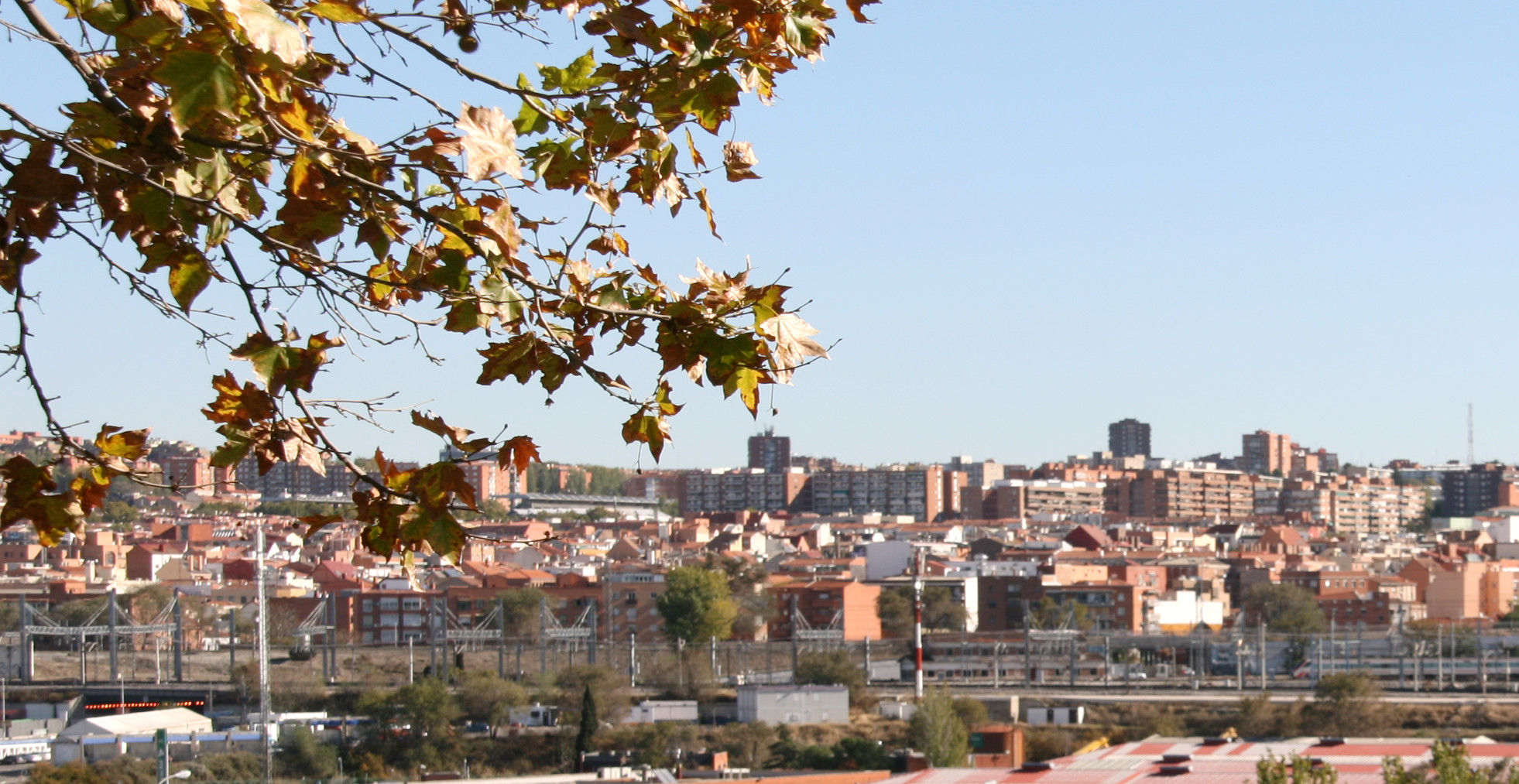

- Country: Spain
- Region: Community of Madrid
- Municipality: Madrid
- District: Puente de Vallecas

San Diego is an administrative neighborhood (barrio) of Madrid belonging to the district of Puente de Vallecas.

== Description ==
San Diego is one of the six administrative neighborhoods comprising the district of Puente de Vallecas. It has a surface of 106.99 ha. It has a sizeable immigrant population; in 2010 34.91% of residents were immigrants. The population in 2016 was 38,953 inhabitants.

== Bibliography ==
- Fernández Montes, Matilde (2007). "Vallecas, identidades compartidas, identidades enfrentadas: La ciudad, el pueblo y el campo, el suburbio y el barrio". Revista de Dialectología y Tradiciones Populares. 62 (1). Madrid: Consejo Superior de Investigaciones Científicas: 33–83. ISSN 0034-7981.
- García Almirall, Pilar (2011). "Informe socio-residencial de San Diego, en Madrid" (PDF). Centre de Política de Sòl i Valoracions. Universitat Politècnica de Catalunya.
