= Bellas Vistas =

Coordinates: 40.452458°N 3.70719°W

- City neighborhood
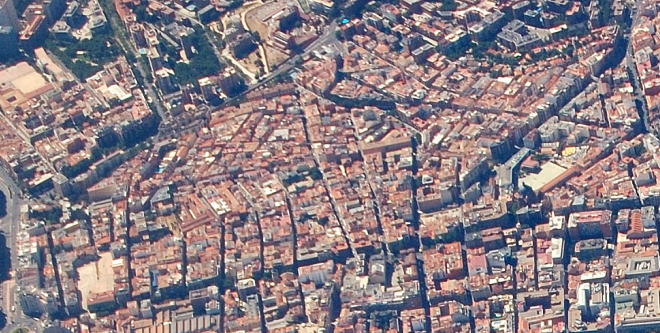
- Interactive map of Bellas Vistas
- Country: Spain
- Region: Community of Madrid
- Municipality: Madrid
- District: Tetuán

Area
  - Total: 0.716261 km^{2} (0.276550 sq mi)

Population (2020)
  - Total: 29,993
  - Density: 41,874/km^{2} (108,450/sq mi)

Bellas Vistas is an administrative neighborhood (barrio) of Madrid, part of the district of Tetuán. It has an area of 0.716261 km^{2} (0.276550 sq mi). As of 1 February 2020, it has a population of 29,993. It was created as slum of the north of the city, on the west side of the Road of France, currently the calle de Bravo Murillo.
