= Piovera (Madrid) =

Ward of Madrid in Spain

Coordinates: 40°27′13″N 3°38′25″W

- Neighborhood
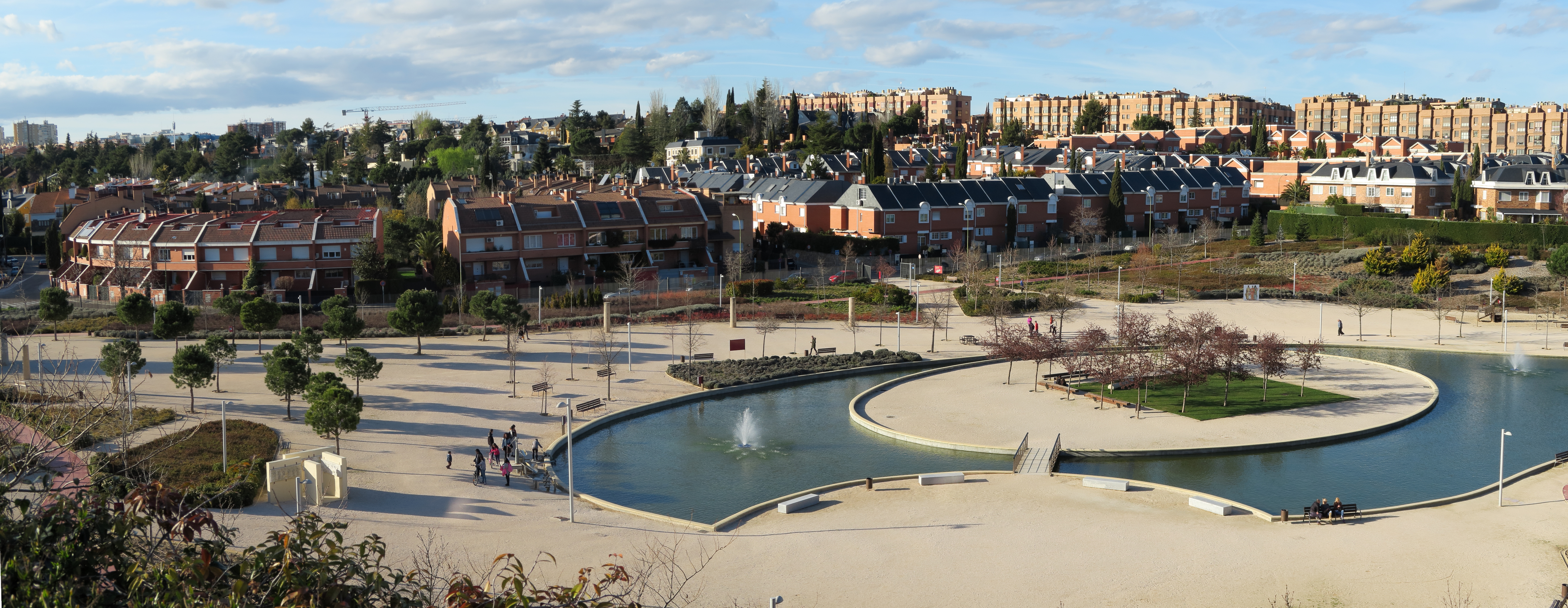

- Country: Spain
- Autonomous community: Community of Madrid
- Municipality: Madrid
- District: Hortaleza

Piovera (aka La Piovera) is an administrative neighborhood (barrio) of Spain's capital city Madrid, and belongs to the district of Hortaleza.

Featuring a residential area consisting of single detached dwellings, the neighborhood is inhabited by affluent people, and it hosts several embassies.
