= Valverde (Madrid) =

City neighborhood in Madrid, Spain

Coordinates: 40°30′21″N 3°41′9″W

- City neighborhood
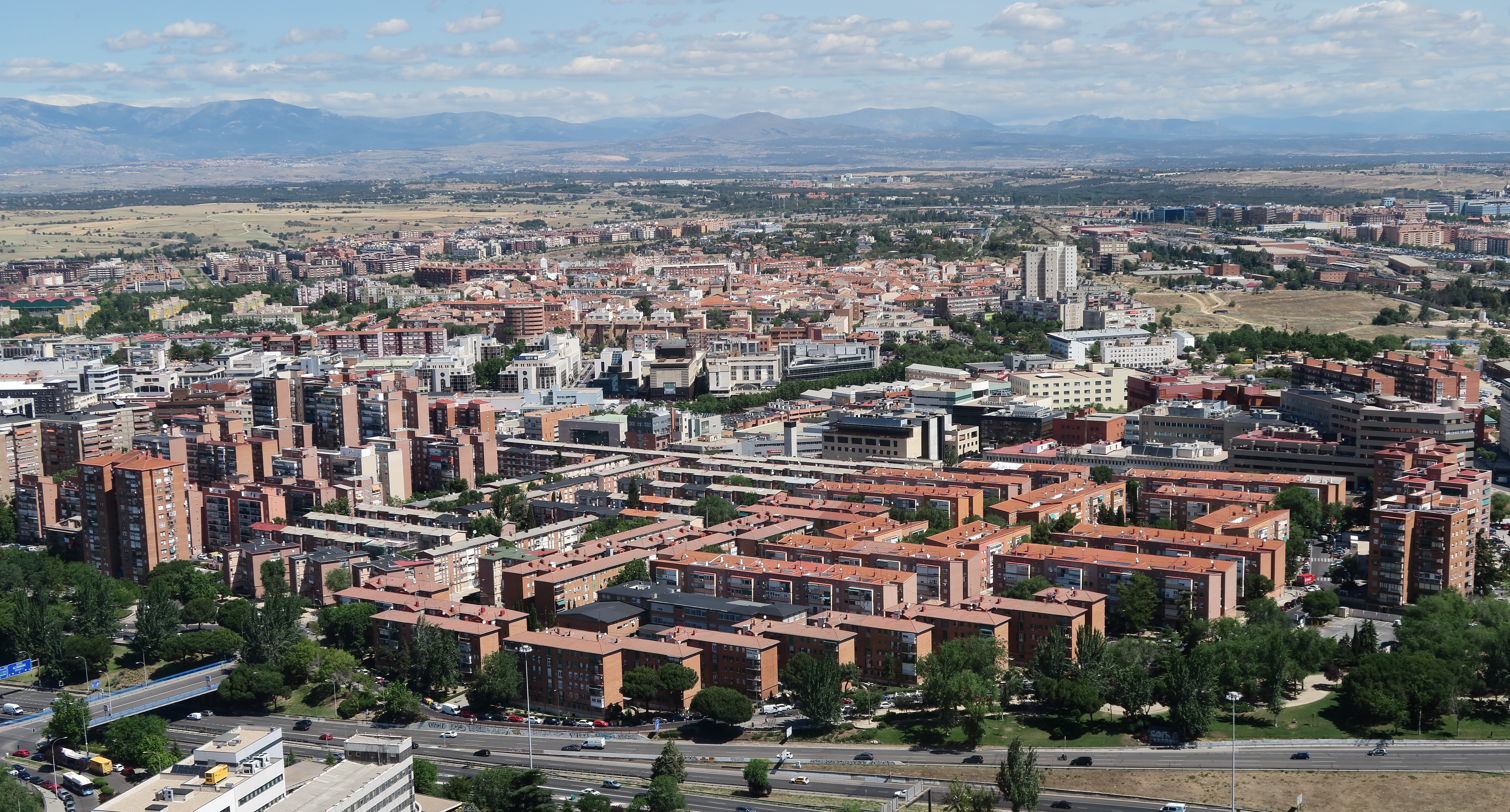

- Country: Spain
- Region: Community of Madrid
- Municipality: Madrid
- District: Fuencarral-El Pardo

Area
  - Total: 8.977802 km^{2} (3.466349 sq mi)

Population (2020)
  - Total: 65,022
  - Density: 7,242.5/km^{2} (18,758/sq mi)

Valverde is an administrative neighborhood (barrio) of Madrid belonging to the district of Fuencarral-El Pardo. It has an area of 8.977802 km^{2} (3.466349 sq mi). As of 1 March 2020, it has a population of 65,022. The historic centre of Fuencarral (Fuencarral Pueblo), belongs to the Valverde neighborhood. The Hospital Universitario Ramón y Cajal is also located in the neighborhood.
