= Vallehermoso (Madrid) =

Coordinates: 40°26′34″N 3°42′42″W

- City neighborhood
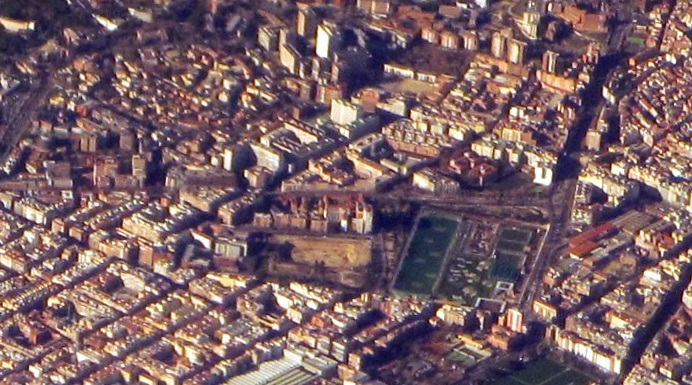

- Country: Spain
- Region: Community of Madrid
- Municipality: Madrid
- District: Chamberí

Area
  - Total: 1.068709 km^{2} (0.412631 sq mi)

Population (2020)
  - Total: 20,480
  - Density: 19,160/km^{2} (49,630/sq mi)

Vallehermoso is an administrative neighborhood (barrio) of Madrid belonging to the district of Chamberí. It has an area of 1.068709 km^{2} (0.412631 sq mi). As of 1 February 2020, it has a population of 20,480. The Vallehermoso Stadium, the traditional venue in the city for athletics competitions, is located in the neighborhood. The stadium re-opened in 2019.
