= Fuentelarreina =

Coordinates: 40°28′55″N 3°44′33″W

- City neighborhood
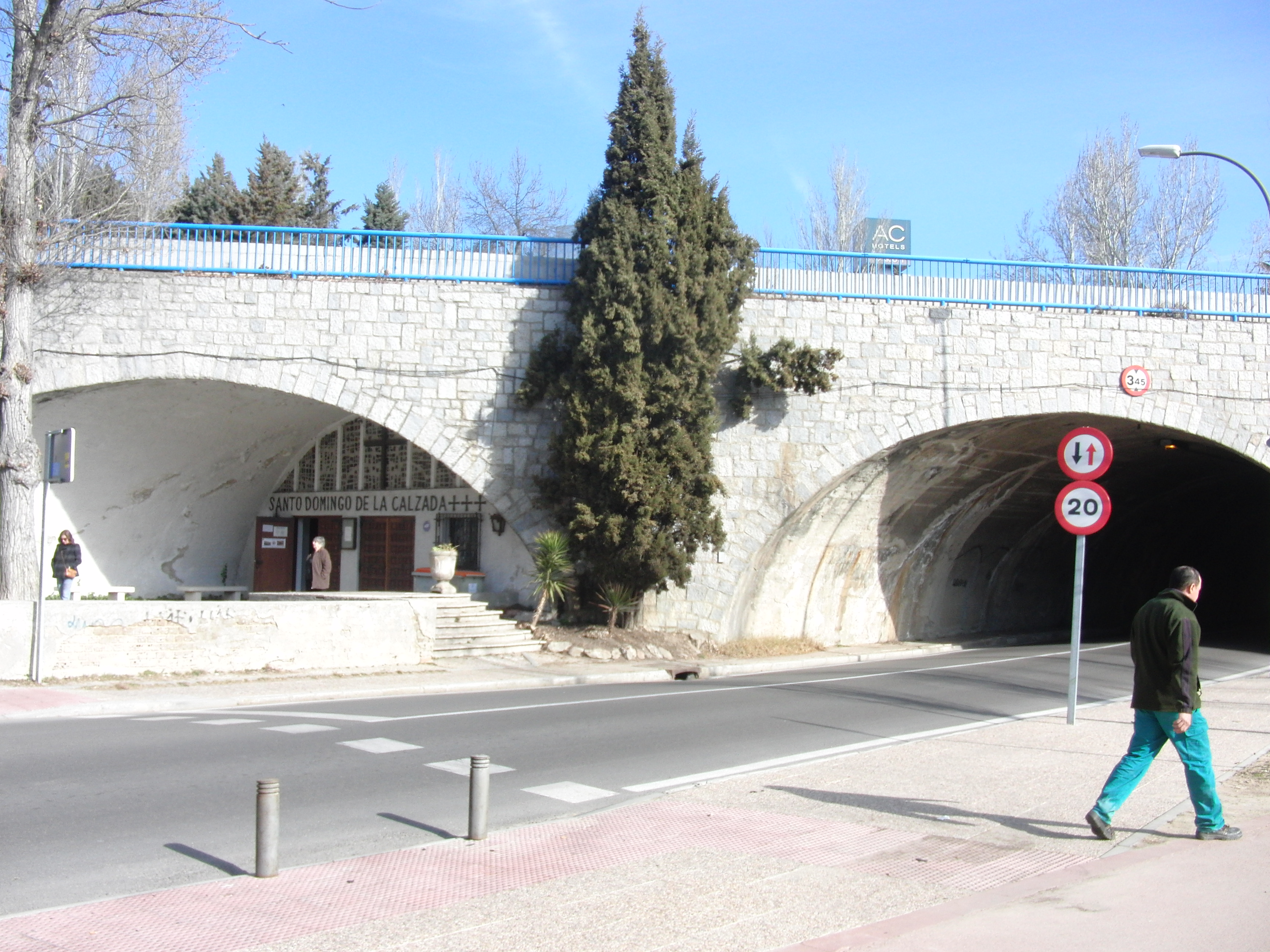
- Interactive map of Fuentelarreina
- Country: Spain
- Region: Community of Madrid
- Municipality: Madrid
- District: Fuencarral-El Pardo

Fuentelarreina is an administrative neighborhood (barrio) of Madrid belonging to the district of Fuencarral-El Pardo.
