= Jerónimos (Madrid) =

Coordinates: 40°24′50″N 3°41′27″W

Los Jerónimos
- Neighborhood of Madrid
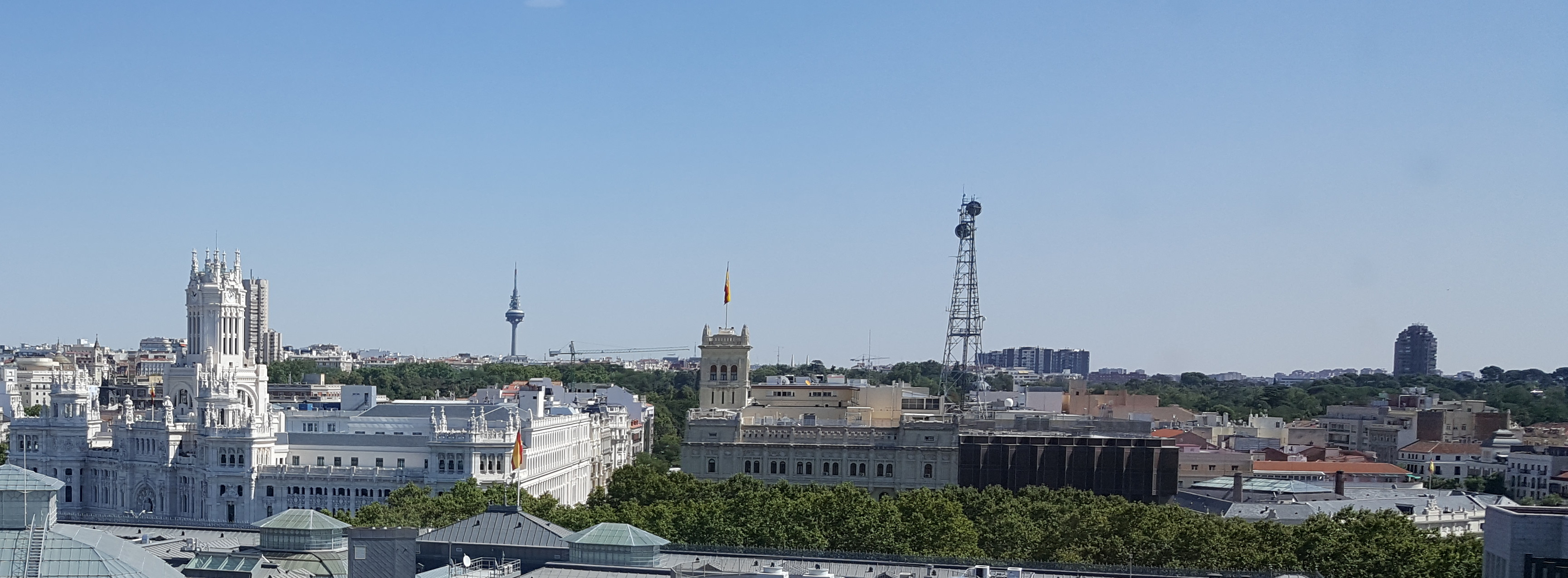
- Interactive map of Los Jerónimos
- Country: Spain
- Autonomous community: Madrid
- Municipality: Madrid
- District: Retiro

Area
  - Total: 1.900627 km^{2} (0.733836 sq mi)

Los Jerónimos is an administrative neighborhood (barrio) of Madrid belonging to the district of Retiro. It is 1.900627 km² in size. The Retiro Park, the Town Hall and the Prado Museum are located within its limits.
