= Comillas (Madrid) =

Coordinates: 40°23′34″N 3°42′50″W

- City neighborhood
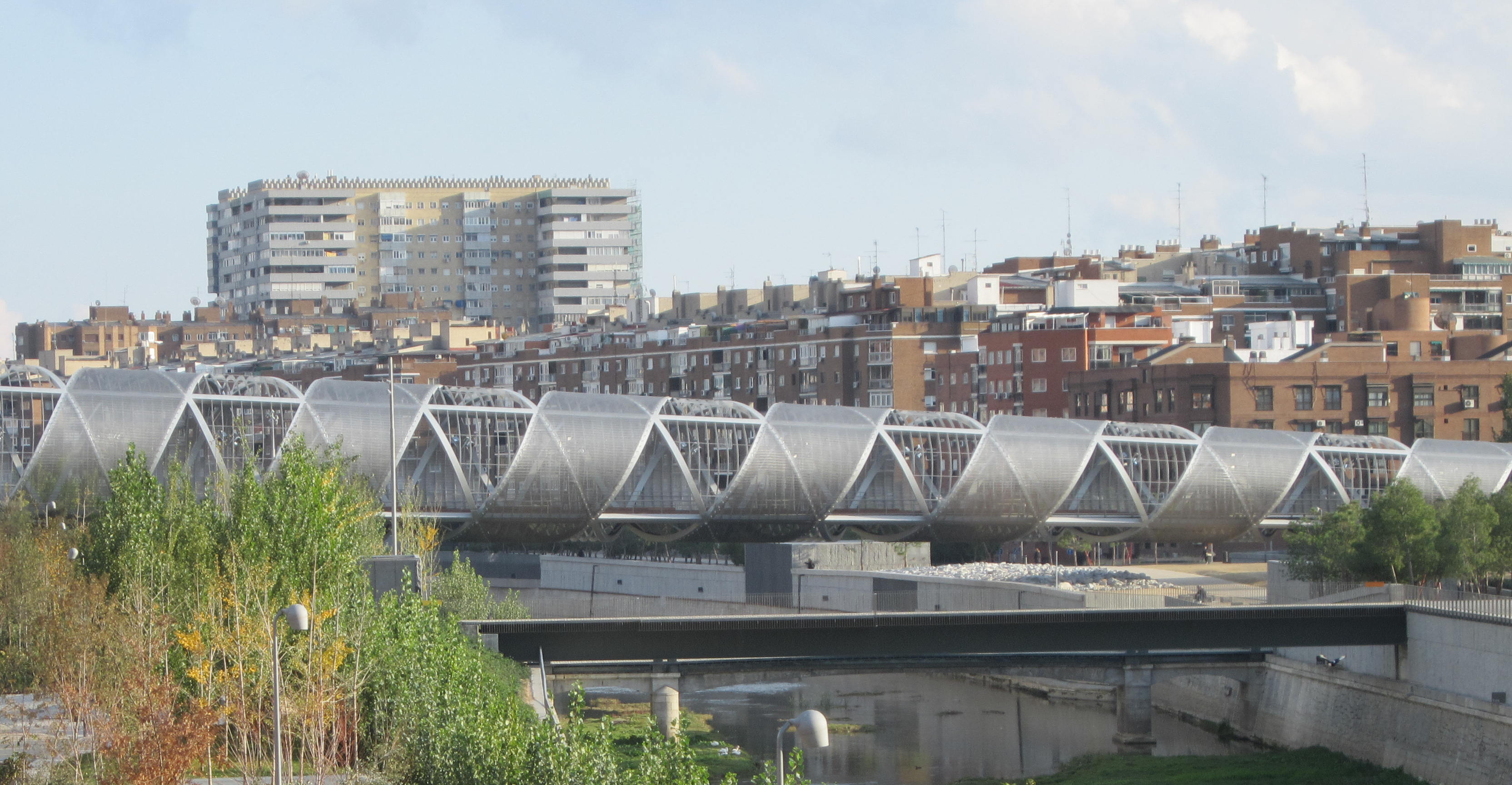
- Interactive map of Comillas
- Country: Spain
- Region: Community of Madrid
- Municipality: Madrid
- District: Carabanchel

Comillas is an administrative neighborhood (barrio) of Madrid belonging to the district of Carabanchel. It is 0.665999 km^{2} in size. With a perimeter of 4,257 m, it is limited by the A-42/paseo de Santa María de la Cabeza, the Antonio de Leyva Street and the Manzanares.
