= Lucero (Madrid) =

Coordinates: 40°24′38″N 3°44′9″W

- City neighborhood
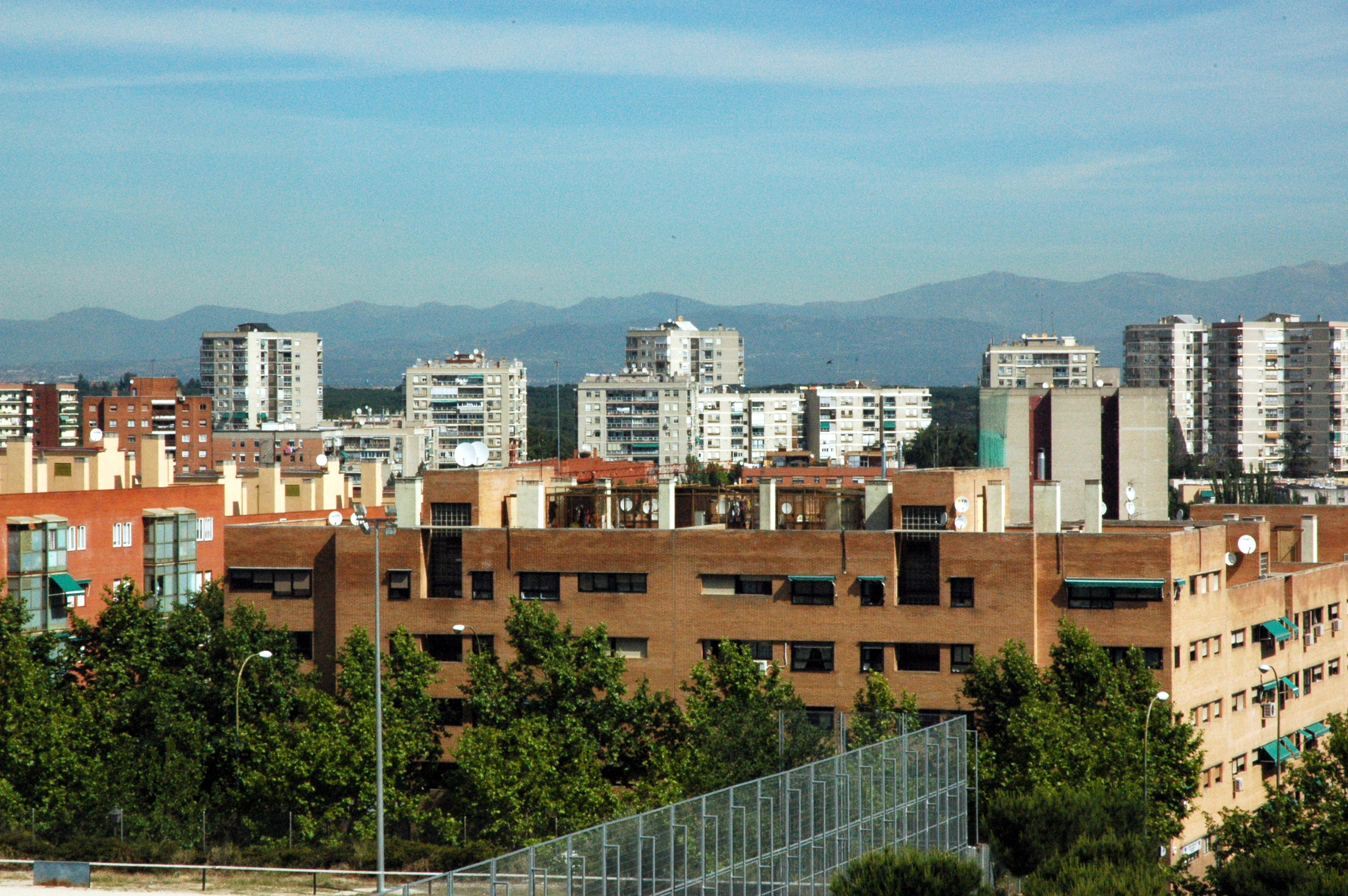
- Interactive map of Lucero
- Country: Spain
- Region: Community of Madrid
- Municipality: Madrid
- District: Latina

Lucero ([luˈθe.ɾo], "Brightness") is an administrative neighborhood (barrio) of Madrid belonging to the district of Latina.
