= San Blas-Canillejas =

Coordinates: 40.426001°N 3.612764°W

- District of Madrid
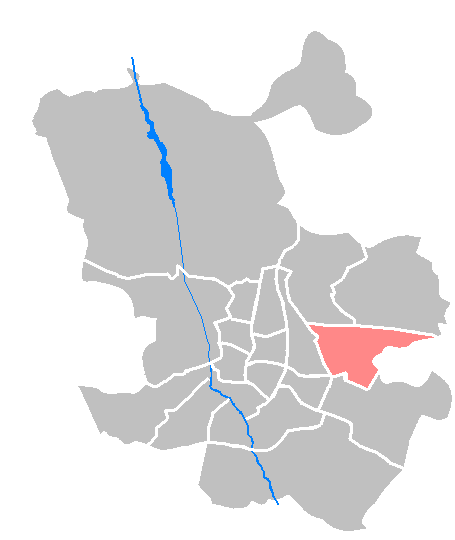
- Country: Spain
- Aut. community: Madrid
- Municipality: Madrid

Government
  - Councillor-President: Almudena Maíllo del Valle (PP, 2023)

Area
  - Total: 22.36 km^{2} (8.63 sq mi)

Population
  - Total: 157,367
  - Density: 7,035.3/km^{2} (18,221/sq mi)
- Postal code: 28032
- Madrid district number: 20

San Blas-Canillejas is a district to the east of Madrid's city centre. The population of the district is an estimated 149,909.

== Geography ==
=== Subdivision ===
The district is administratively divided into 8 wards (Barrios):

- Amposta
- Arcos
- Canillejas
- Hellín
- Rejas
- Rosas
- Salvador
- Simancas

== History ==
The municipality of Canillejas was one of the oldest towns in the Community of Madrid, annexed to the city in 1949. When Madrid was divided into different districts, it did not manage to recover the name of Canillejas as the name of the district, something different from what happened with other municipalities that conserved their names, such as Barajas, Vicálvaro, Carabanchel or Villaverde.
