= Marroquina =

Coordinates: 40°24′40″N 3°38′28″W

- City neighborhood
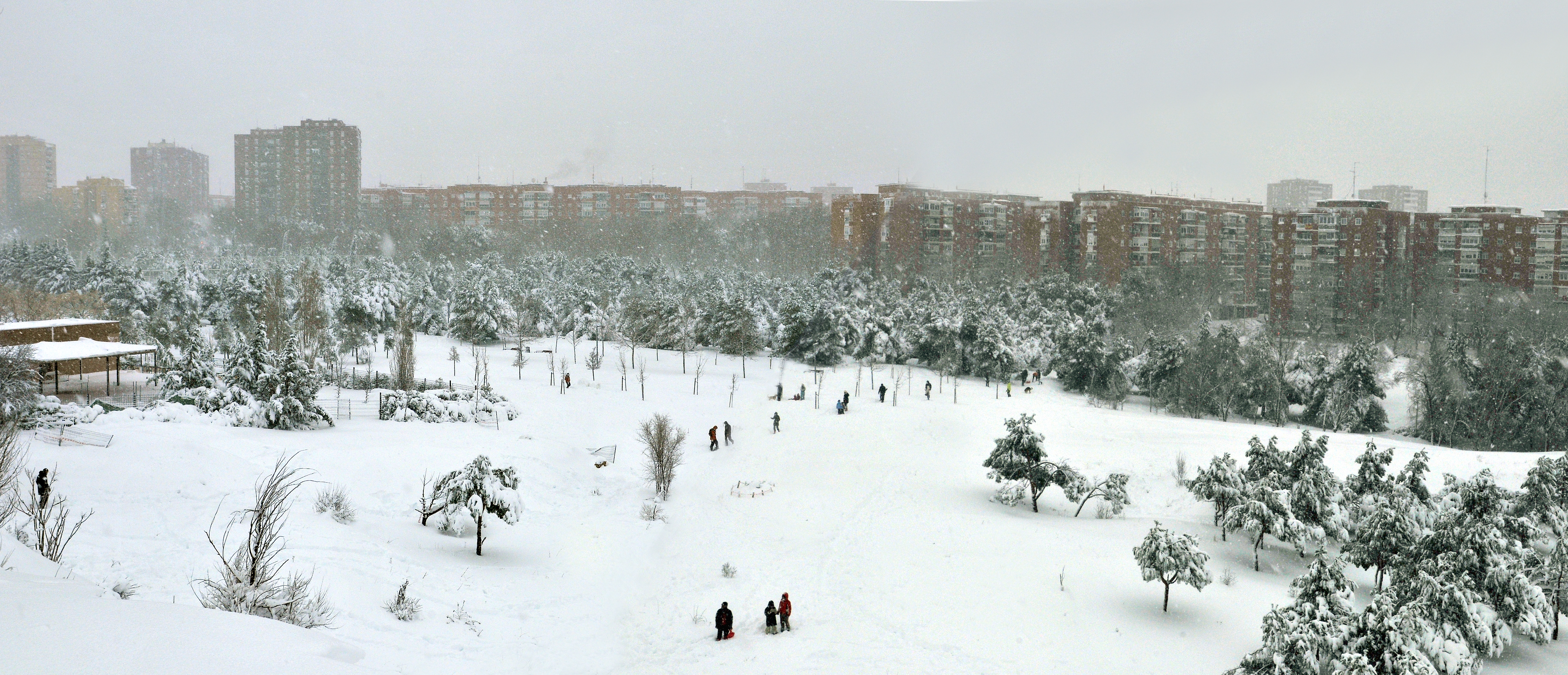
- Interactive map of Marroquina
- Country: Spain
- Autonomous community: Madrid
- Municipality: Madrid
- District: Moratalaz

Area
  - Total: 1.789256 km^{2} (0.690836 sq mi)

Marroquina is an administrative neighborhood (barrio) of Madrid belonging to the district of Moratalaz. It is 1.789256 km^{2} in size and has a 6,746 m perimeter.
