= Gaztambide (Madrid) =

Coordinates: 40°26′5″N 3°42′53″W

- Ward of Madrid
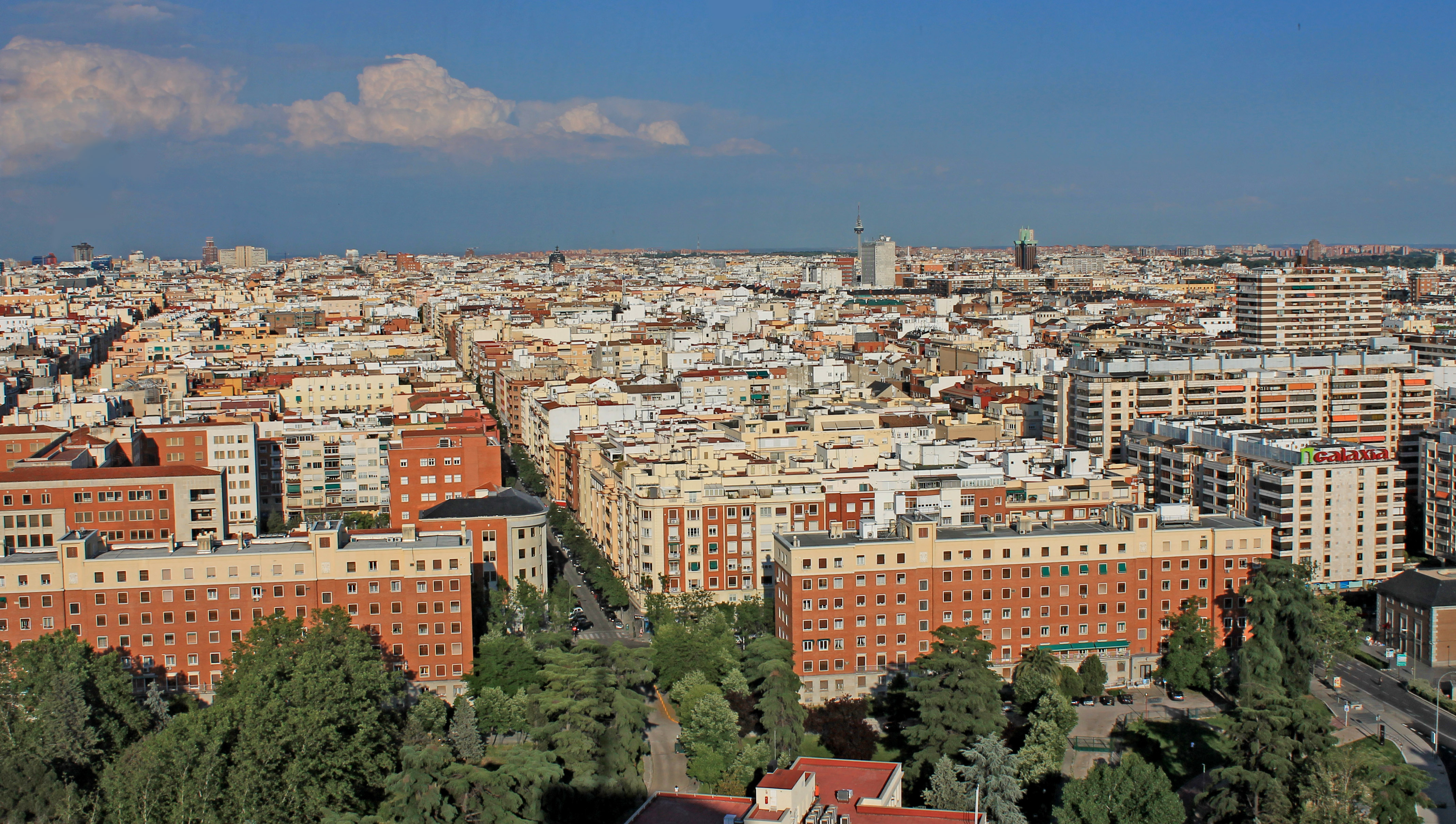
- Interactive map of Gaztambide
- Country: Spain
- Autonomous community: Madrid
- Municipality: Madrid
- District: Chamberí

Area
  - Total: 0.506596 km^{2} (0.195598 sq mi)

Population
  - Total: 23,038
  - Density: 45,000/km^{2} (120,000/sq mi)

Gaztambide is an administrative neighborhood (barrio) of Madrid belonging to the district of Chamberí. It has an area of 0.506596 km^{2} (0.195598 sq mi). As of 1 February 2021, it has a population of 23,038.
