= San Pascual (Madrid) =

Coordinates: 40°26′33″N 3°39′9″W

- Ward of Madrid
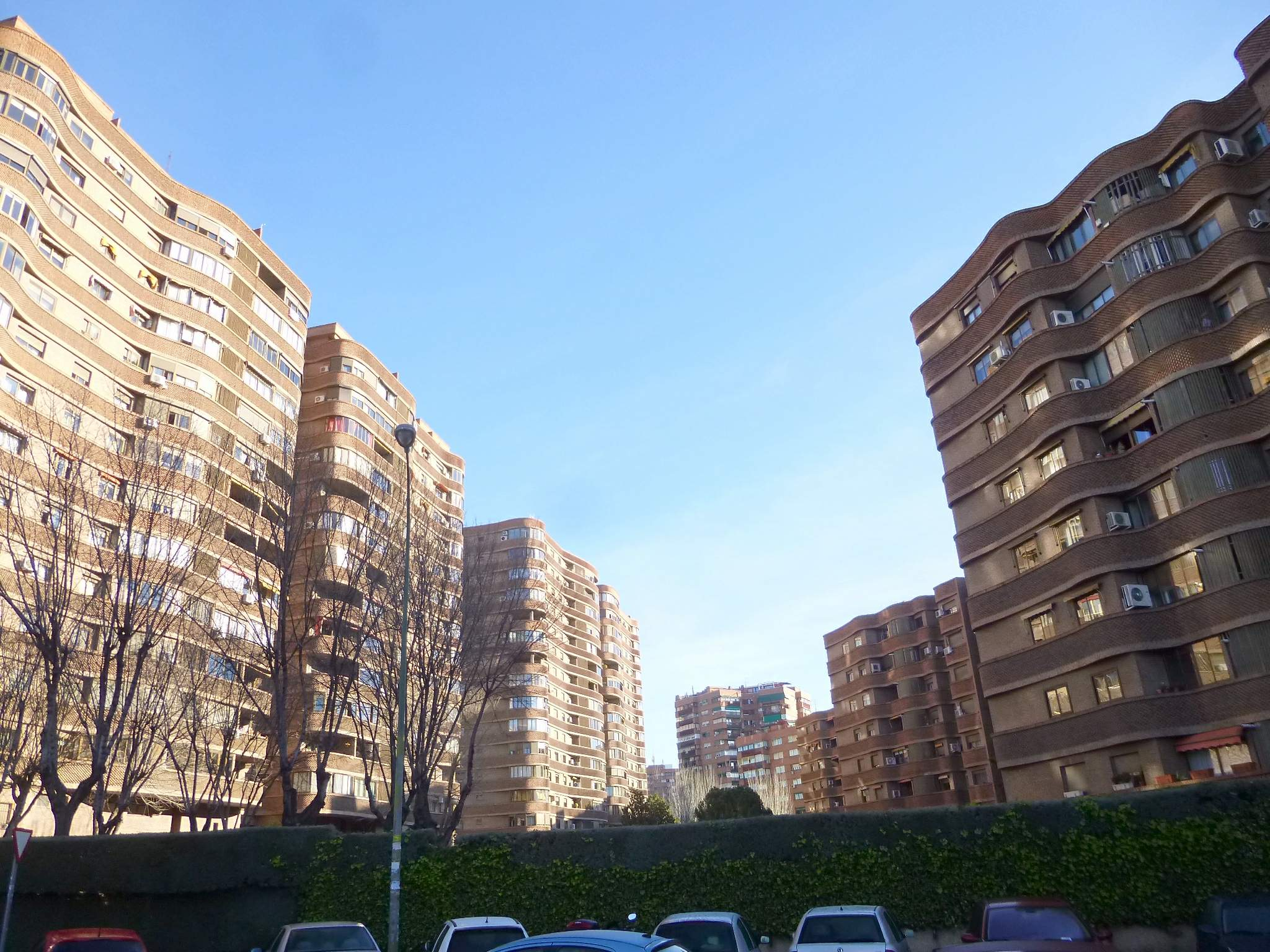
- Country: Spain
- Autonomous community: Madrid
- Municipality: Madrid
- District: Ciudad Lineal

San Pascual is a ward (barrio) of Madrid belonging to the district of Ciudad Lineal.
