= Palomeras Sureste =

Coordinates: 40°23′16″N 3°38′22″W

- City neighborhood
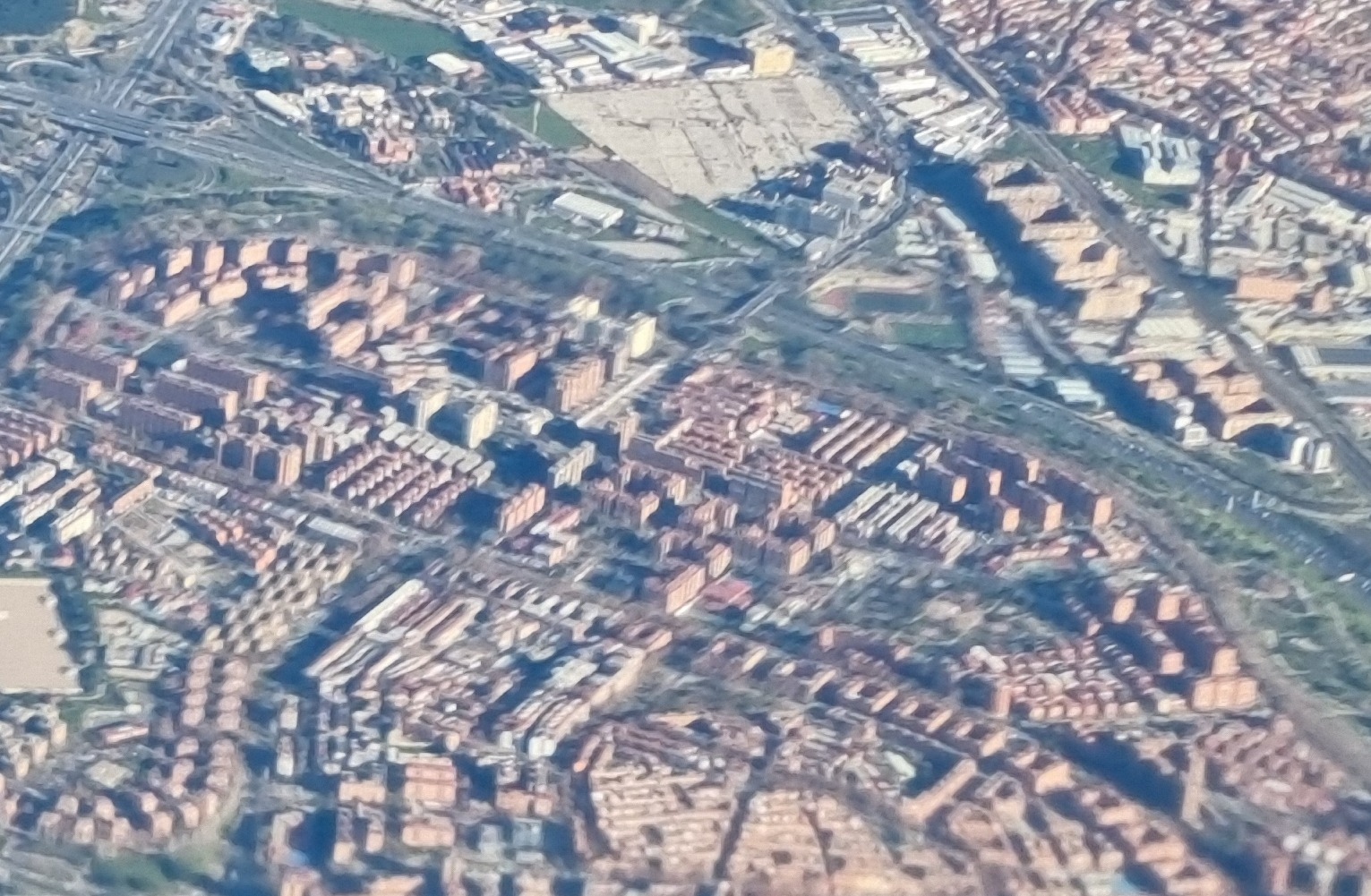

- Country: Spain
- Autonomous community: Madrid
- Municipality: Madrid
- District: Puente de Vallecas

Palomeras Sureste is a neighborhood of Madrid belonging to the district of Puente de Vallecas.
