= Butarque =

Coordinates: 40°20′37″N 3°40′47″W

- Neighborhood of Madrid
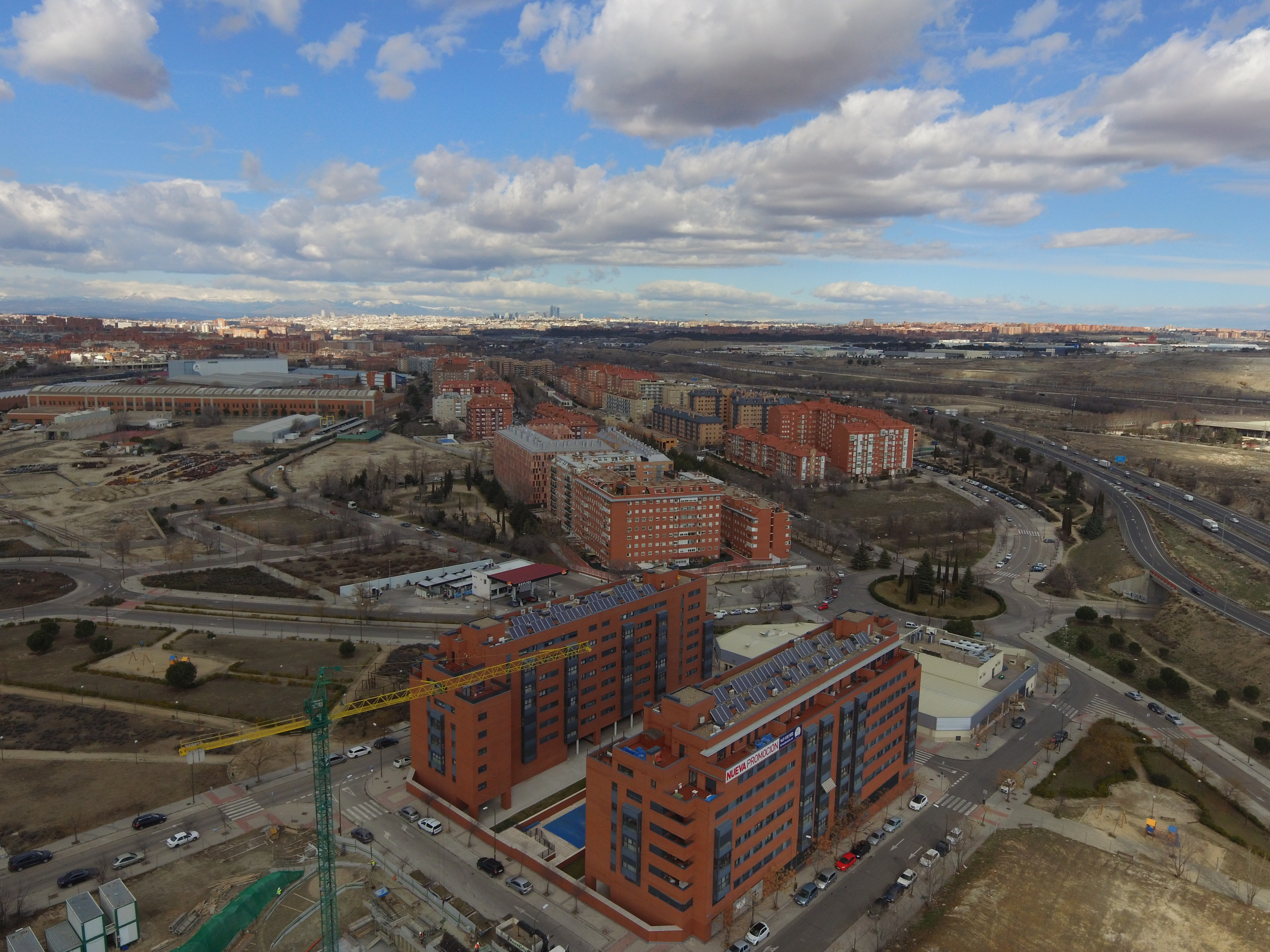
- Interactive map of Butarque
- Country: Spain
- Aut. community: Community of Madrid
- Municipality: Madrid
- District: Villaverde

Butarque is an administrative neighborhood (barrio) of Madrid, the capital of Spain. The ward belongs to the district of Villaverde.
