= Fontarrón =

- Neighborhood of Madrid
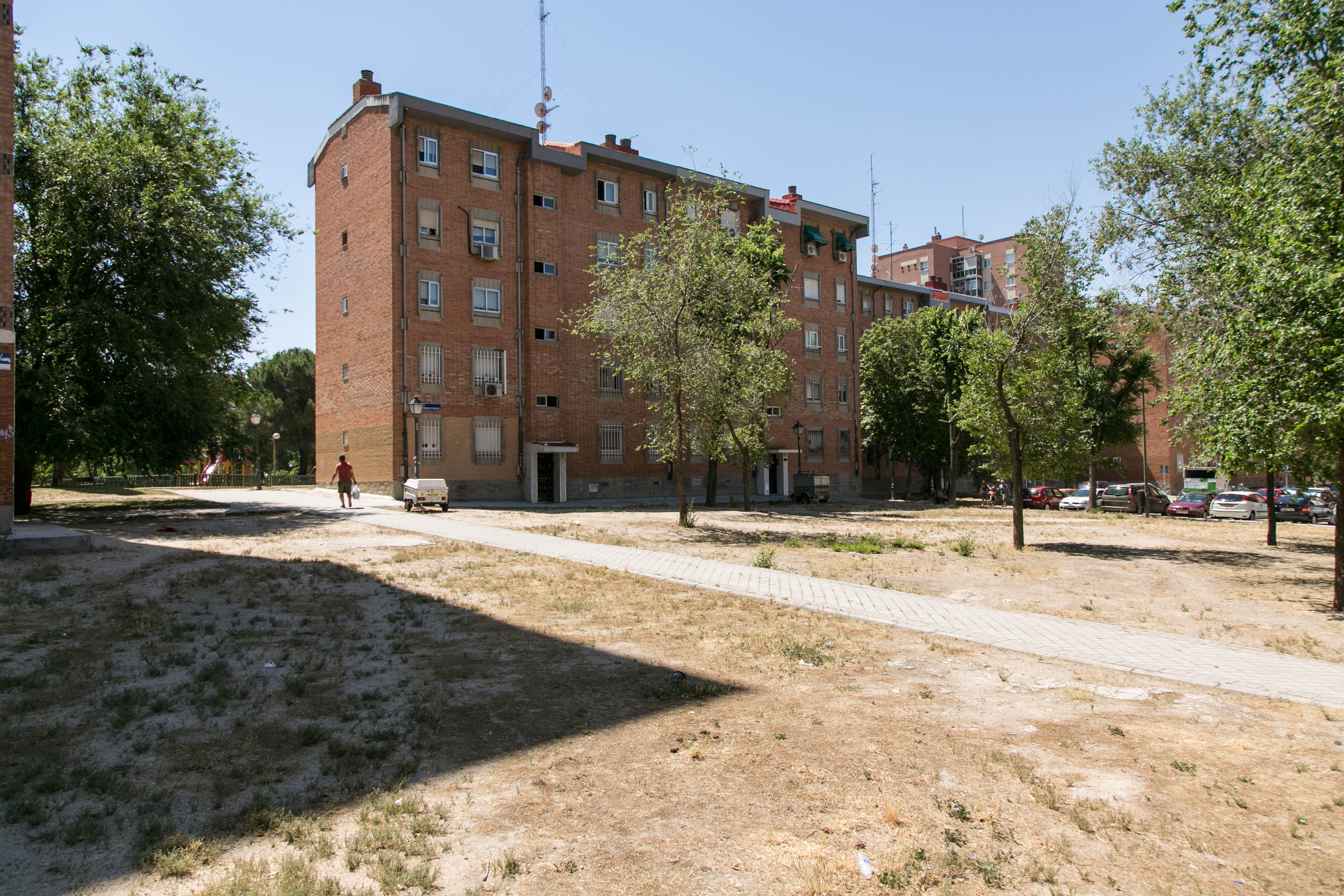
- Interactive map of Fontarrón
- Country: Spain
- Autonomous community: Madrid
- Municipality: Madrid
- District: Moratalaz

Area
  - Total: 0.964574 km^{2} (0.372424 sq mi)

Fontarrón is an administrative neighborhood (barrio) of Madrid belonging to the district of Moratalaz. It is 0.964574 km^{2} in size.
