= Mar de Cristal (Madrid Metro) =

Madrid Metro station

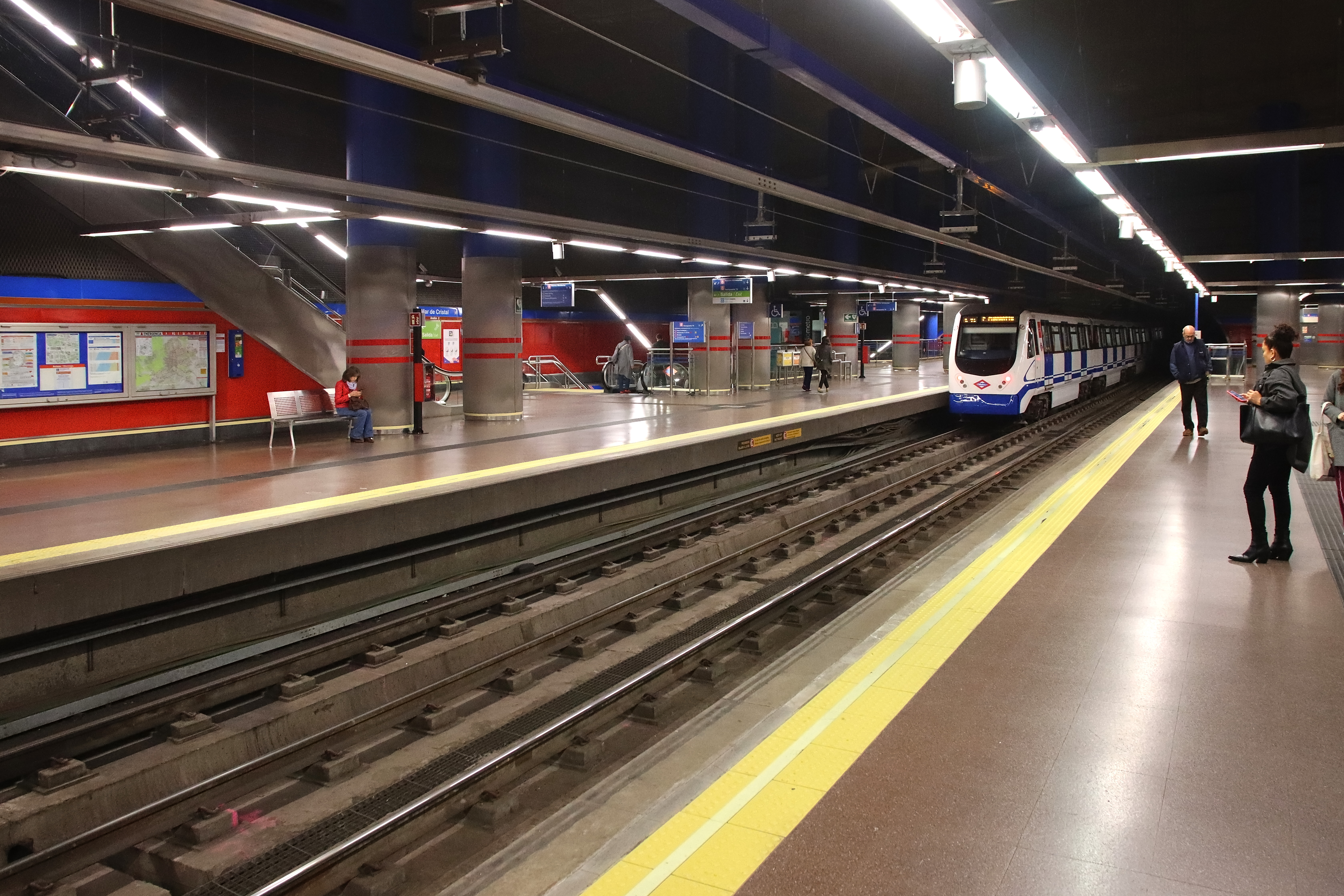
- Line 4 platforms

General information
- Location: Hortaleza, Madrid; Spain
- Coordinates: 40.4694241°N 3.6383243°W
- System: Madrid Metro station
- Owner: CRTM
- Operator: CRTM

Construction
- Structure type: Underground
- Accessible: Yes

Other information
- Fare zone: A

History
- Opened: 27 April 1998; 28 years ago

Services
Preceding station	Madrid Metro	Following station
Canillas towards Argüelles	Line 4	San Lorenzo towards Pinar de Chamartín
Pinar del Rey towards Nuevos Ministerios	Line 8	Feria de Madrid towards Aeropuerto T4
Location
- Location within Madrid

Mar de Cristal [ˈmaɾ ðe kɾisˈtal] is a station on Line 4 and Line 8 of the Madrid Metro, located under the Glorieta Mar de Cristal ("Sea of Crystal Roundabout"). It is located in fare Zone A.
