= Virgen del Cortijo (Madrid Metro) =

Madrid metro station

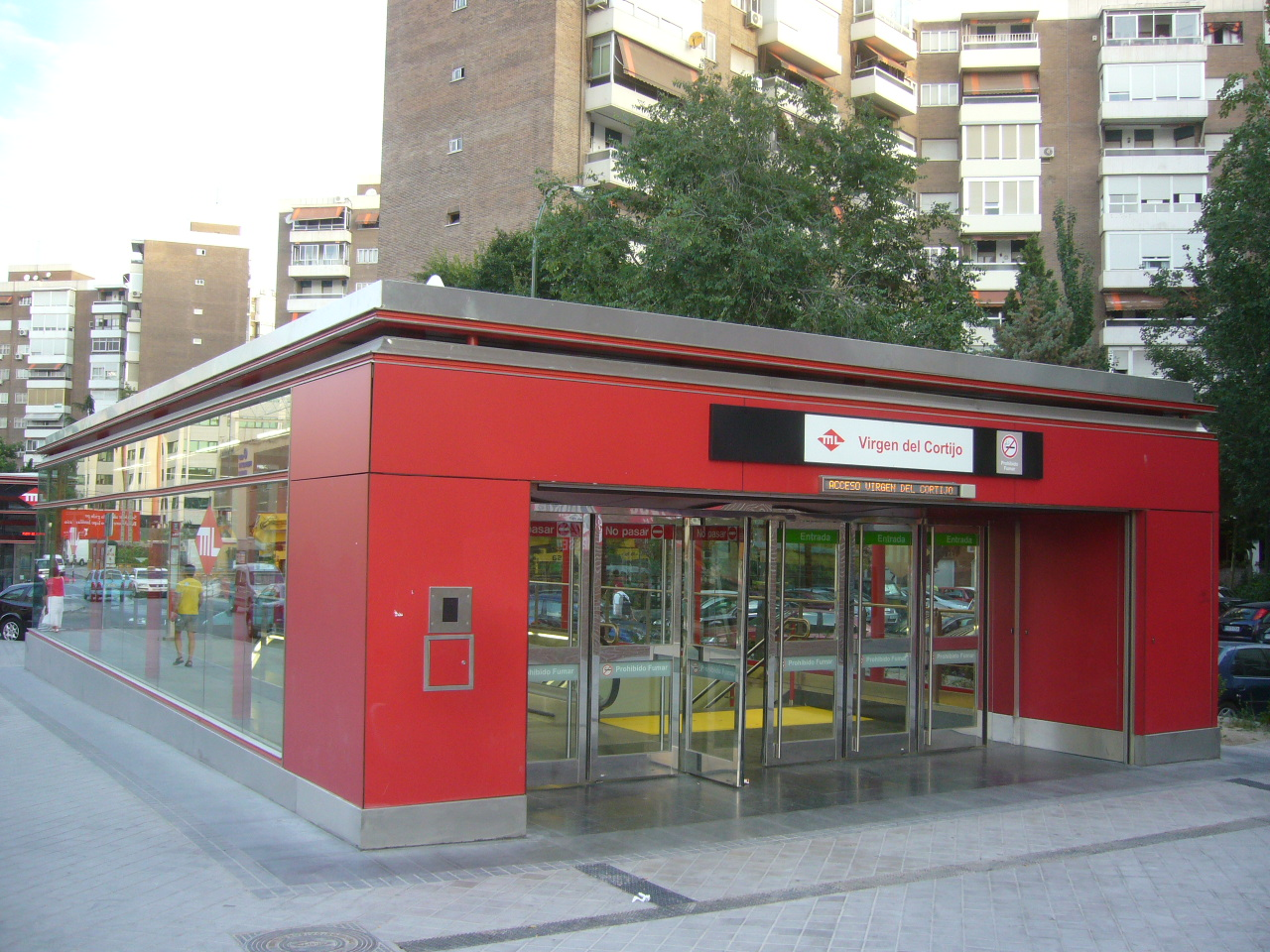

General information
- Location: Hortaleza, Madrid; Spain
- Coordinates: 40.487342°N 3.6609833°W
- System: Madrid Metro station
- Owner: CRTM
- Operator: CRTM

Other information
- Fare zone: A

History
- Opened: 24 May 2007; 19 years ago

Services
Preceding station	Madrid Metro	Following station
Fuente de la Mora towards Pinar de Chamartín	Line ML-1	Antonio Saura towards Las Tablas
Location
- Location within Madrid

Virgen del Cortijo [ˈbiɾxen del koɾˈtixo] is a station on Line 1 of the Metro Ligero. It is located in fare Zone A.
