= Antonio Saura (Madrid Metro) =

Metro station of the Metro Ligero

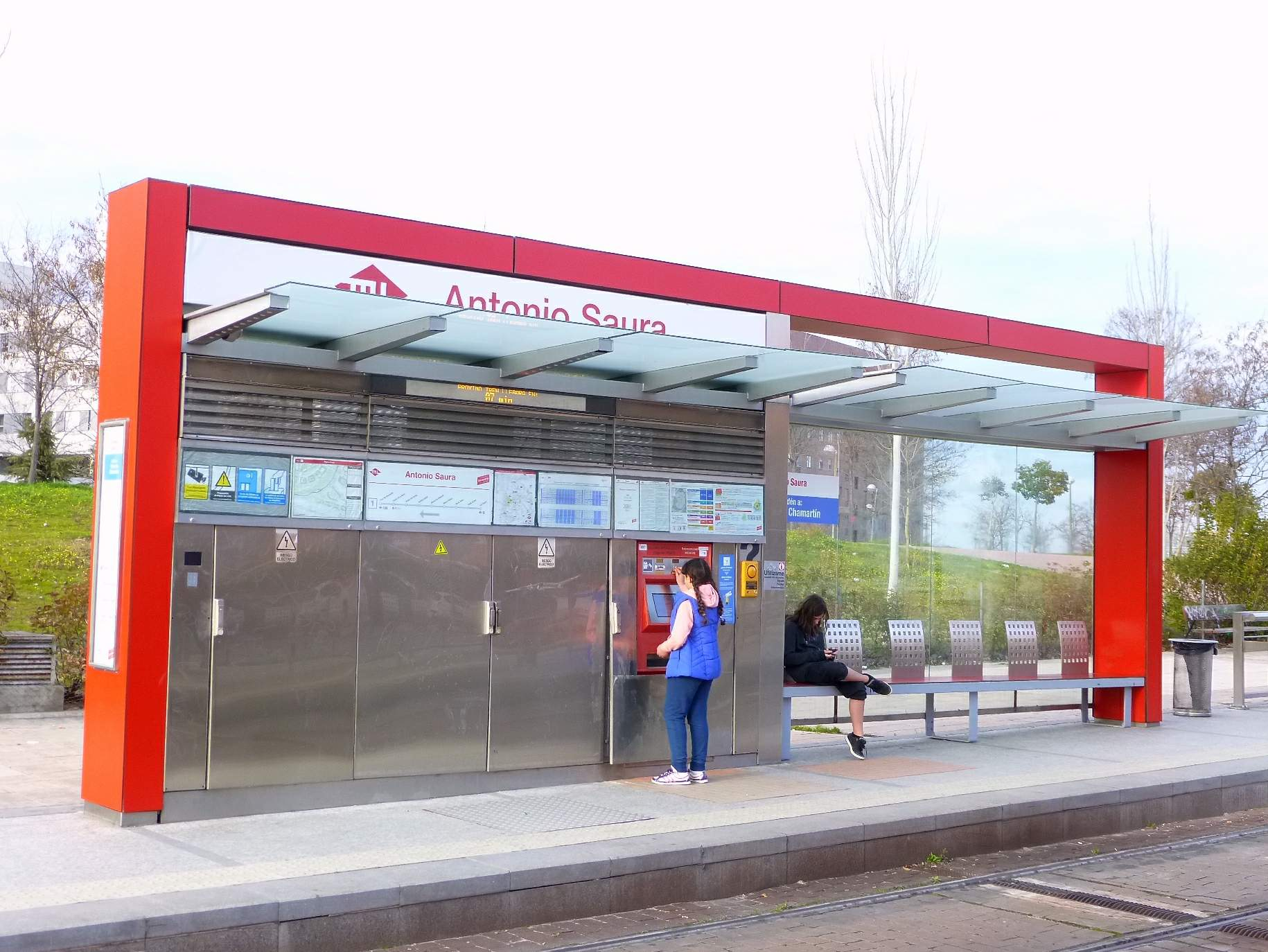

General information
- Location: Hortaleza, Madrid; Spain
- Coordinates: 40.4854564°N 3.6535315°W
- System: Madrid Metro station
- Owner: CRTM
- Operator: CRTM

Other information
- Fare zone: A

History
- Opened: 24 May 2007; 19 years ago

Services
Preceding station	Madrid Metro	Following station
Virgen del Cortijo towards Pinar de Chamartín	Line ML-1	Álvarez de Villaamil towards Las Tablas
Location
- Location within Madrid

Antonio Saura [anˈtonjo ˈsawɾa] is a station on Line 1 of the Metro Ligero. It is located in fare Zone A.
