= Canillas (Madrid Metro) =

Madrid Metro station

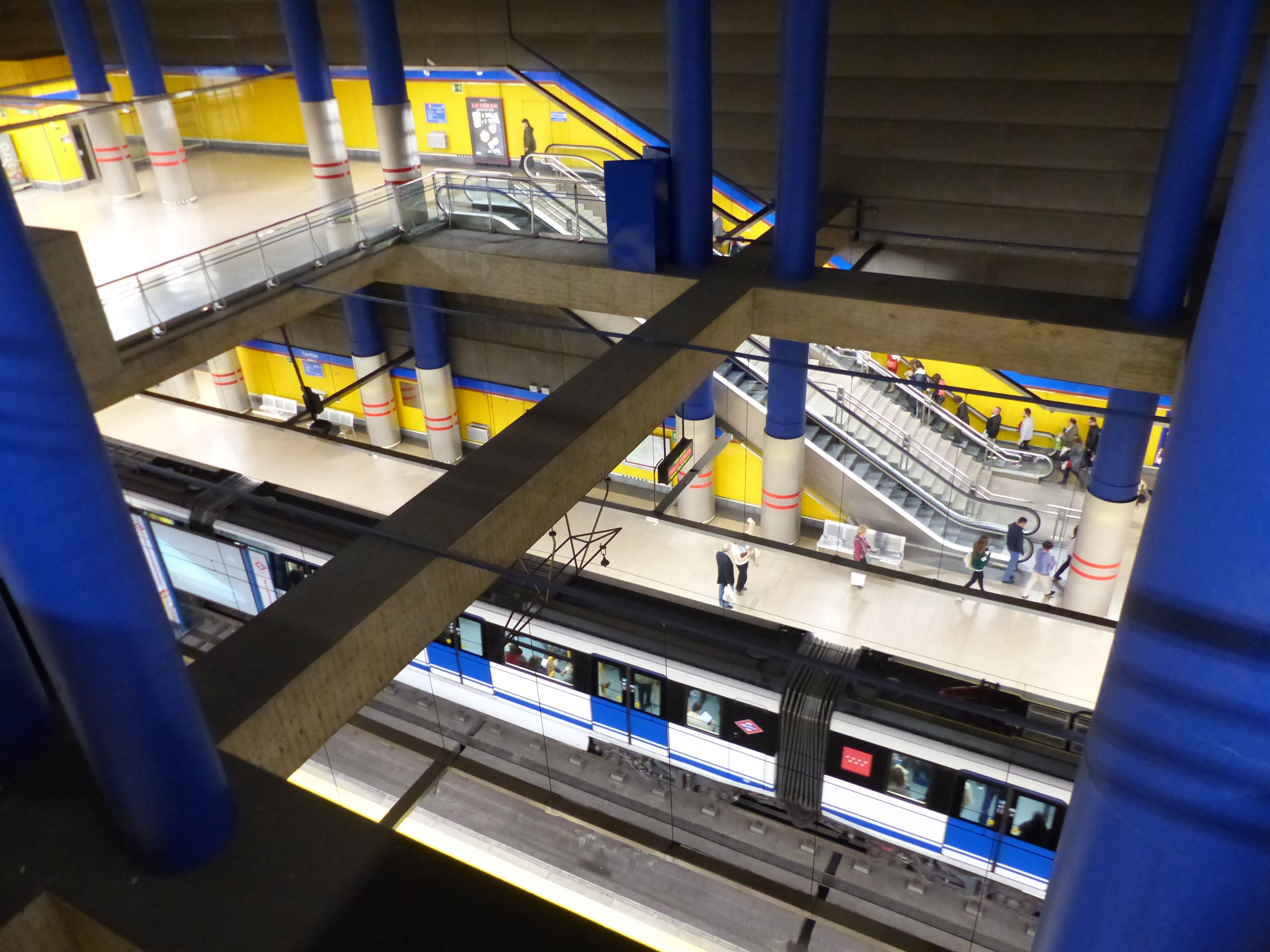

General information
- Location: Hortaleza, Madrid; Spain
- Coordinates: 40.4638092°N 3.6355935°W
- System: Madrid Metro station
- Owner: CRTM
- Operator: CRTM

Construction
- Structure type: Underground
- Accessible: No

Other information
- Fare zone: A

History
- Opened: 27 April 1998; 28 years ago

Services
Preceding station	Madrid Metro	Following station
Esperanza towards Argüelles	Line 4	Mar de Cristal towards Pinar de Chamartín
Location
- Location within Madrid

Canillas [kaˈni.ʝas] is a station on Line 4 of the Madrid Metro, located in the barrio of Canillas. It is located in fare Zone A.
