= Hortaleza (Madrid Metro) =

Madrid Metro station

- Platform of the station

General information
- Location: Hortaleza, Madrid; Spain
- Coordinates: 40.4753716°N 3.6525732°W
- System: Madrid Metro station
- Owner: CRTM
- Operator: CRTM

Construction
- Structure type: Underground
- Accessible: Yes

Other information
- Fare zone: A

History
- Opened: 11 April 2007; 19 years ago

Services
Preceding station	Madrid Metro	Following station
Parque de Santa María towards Argüelles	Line 4	Manoteras towards Pinar de Chamartín
Location
- Location within Madrid

Hortaleza [oɾtaˈleθa] is a station on Line 4 of the Madrid Metro, in the Hortaleza district. It is located in fare Zone A.
