= Álvarez de Villaamil (Madrid Metro) =

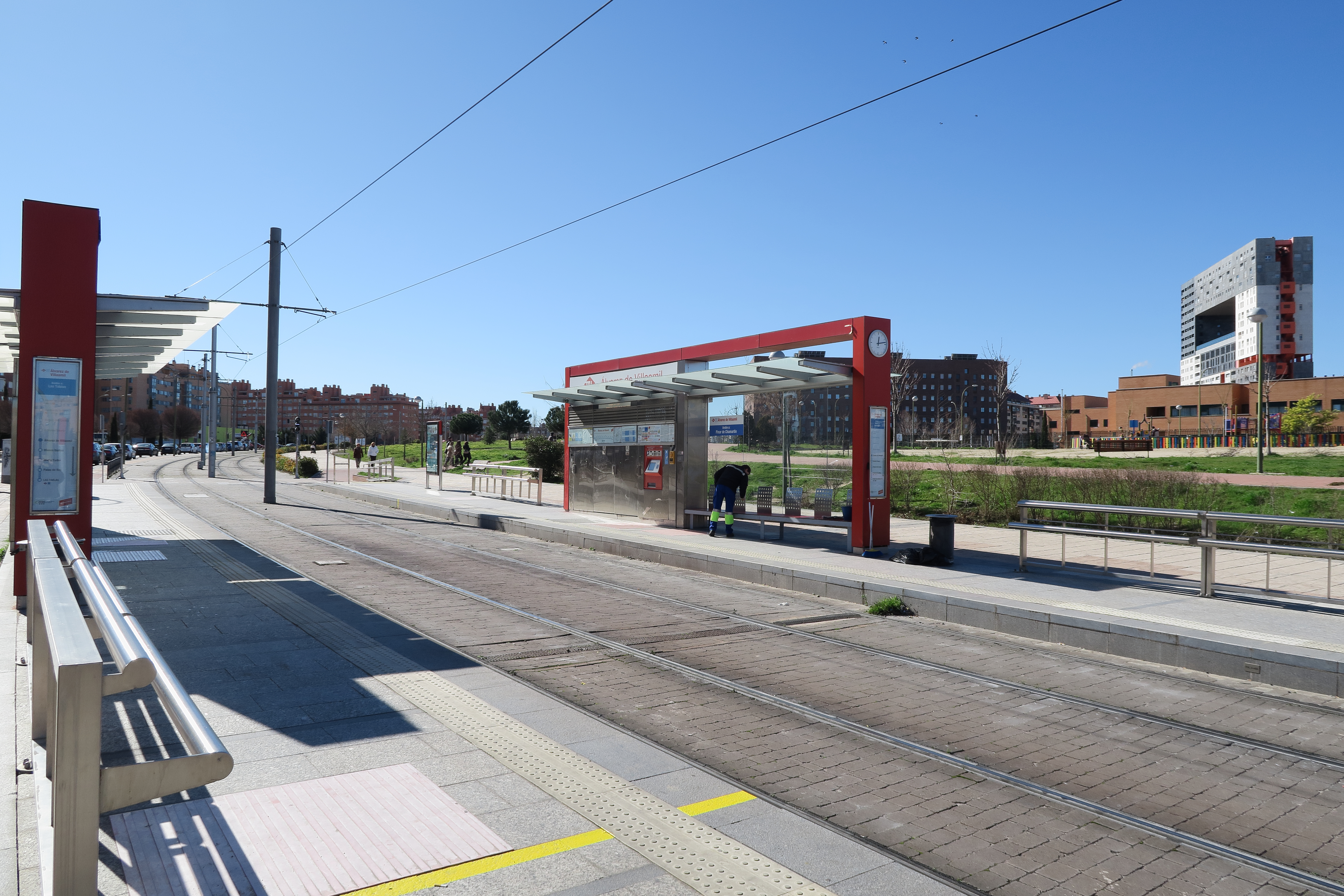

General information
- Location: Hortaleza, Madrid; Spain
- Coordinates: 40.4890452°N 3.6513597°W
- System: Madrid Metro station
- Owner: CRTM
- Operator: CRTM

Other information
- Fare zone: A

History
- Opened: 24 May 2007; 19 years ago

Services
Preceding station	Madrid Metro	Following station
Antonio Saura towards Pinar de Chamartín	Line ML-1	Blasco Ibáñez towards Las Tablas
Location
- Location within Madrid

Álvarez de Villaamil [ˈalβaɾeθ ðe ˌβiʝaaˈmil] is a station on Line 1 of the Metro Ligero. It is located in fare Zone A.
