= María Tudor (Madrid Metro) =

Spanish train station

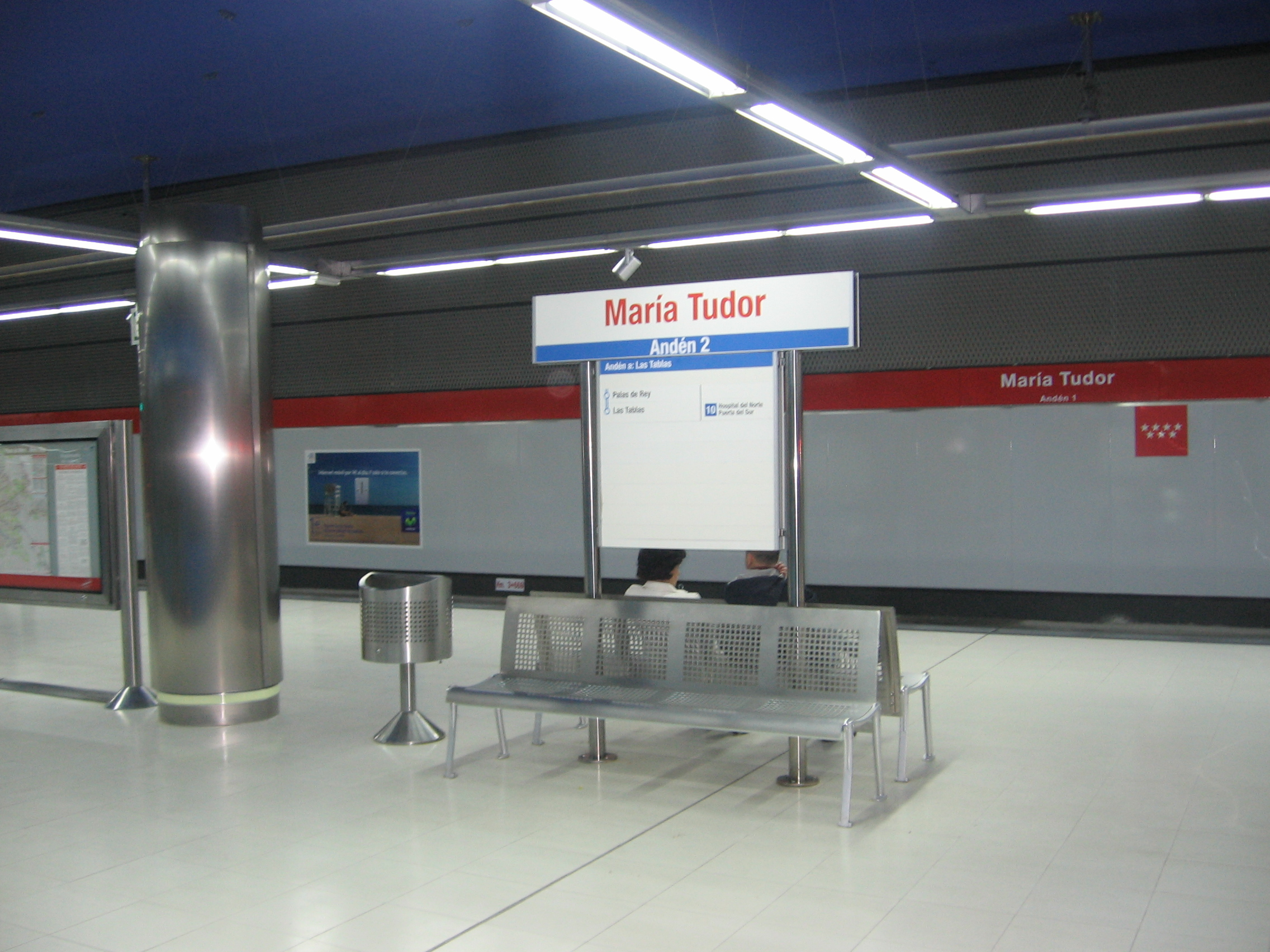

General information
- Location: Hortaleza, Madrid; Spain
- Coordinates: 40.4971648°N 3.6588846°W
- System: Madrid Metro station
- Owner: CRTM
- Operator: CRTM

Other information
- Fare zone: A

History
- Opened: 24 May 2007; 19 years ago

Services
Preceding station	Madrid Metro	Following station
Blasco Ibáñez towards Pinar de Chamartín	Line ML-1	Palas de Rey towards Las Tablas
Location
- Location within Madrid

María Tudor [maˈɾi.a tuˈðoɾ] is a station on Line 1 of the Metro Ligero. It is located in fare Zone A.

The station is named after Quen Mary I, who reigned England and Ireland between 1553 and 1558, as well as being the Queen of Spain through her marriage to Spanish King Phillip II, from 1554-1558.
