= Line 4 (Madrid Metro) =

Rapid transit line of the Madrid Metro

Coordinates: 40.4251°N 3.6835°W

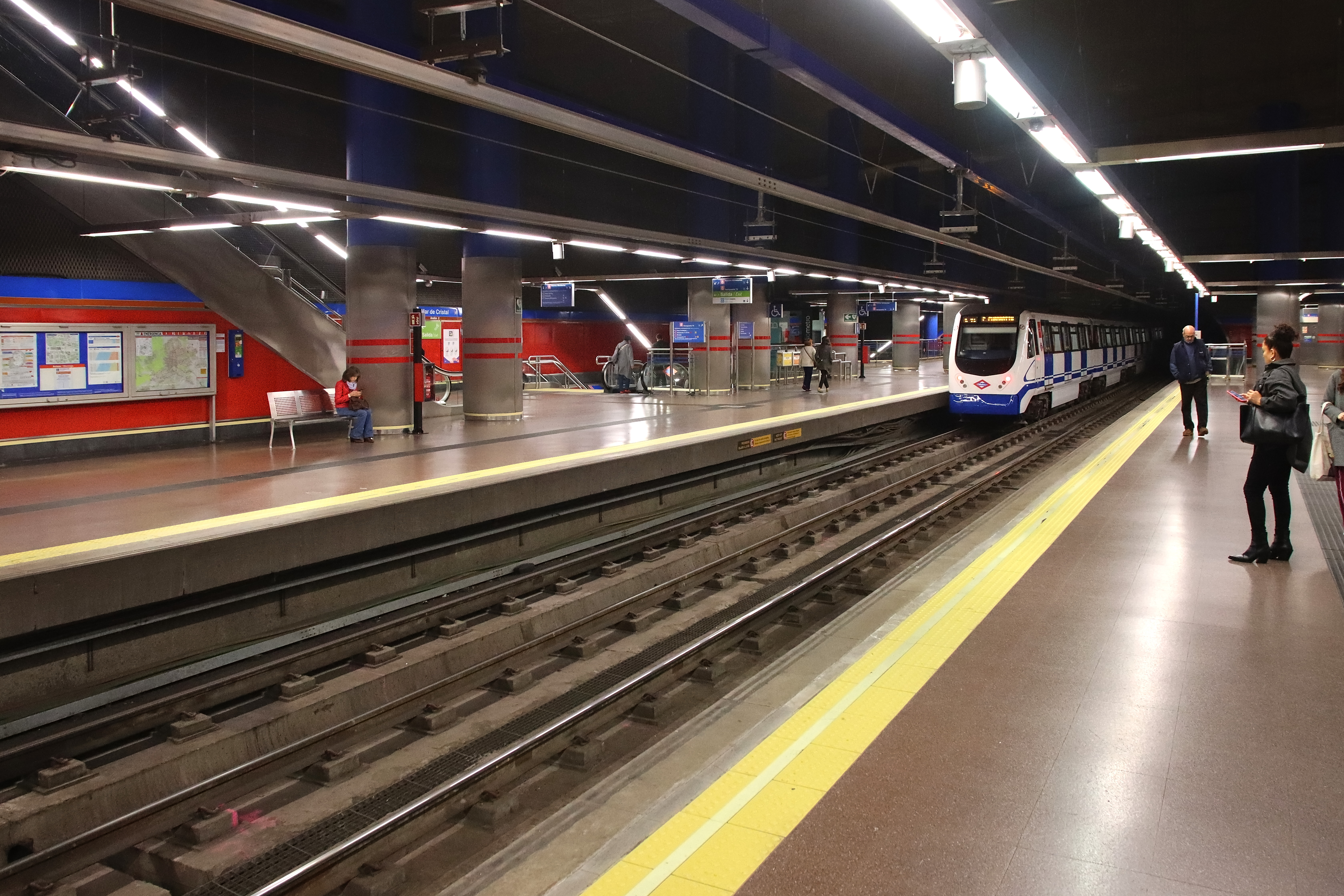
- A Class 3000 train at Mar de Cristal station

Overview
- Native name: Línea 4
- Owner: CRTM
- Locale: Madrid
- Termini: Pinar de Chamartín; Argüelles
- Stations: 23
- Website: www.metromadrid.es/en/linea/linea-4

Service
- Type: Rapid transit
- System: Madrid Metro
- Operator: CRTM
- Rolling stock: CAF 3000

History
- Opened: 24 March 1944; 82 years ago
- Last extension: 2007

Technical
- Line length: 16.0 km (9.9 mi)
- Character: Underground
- Track gauge: 1,445 mm (4 ft 8 7/8 in)

Line 4 is a rapid transit line of the Madrid Metro connecting the west and center of Madrid with the said city's northeastern end, running between Argüelles and Pinar de Chamartín. It consists of a total of 23 narrow-gauge stations with 60-metre platforms. Altogether, its route measures just under 15 kilometers, with a journey that lasts approximately 38 minutes. It is operated by a single train model, the 3000 series of the CAF company, which circulates in compositions of 4 cars. This represents a limitation on its maximum passenger capacity per train, which is compensated by one of the highest frequencies in the entire network.

Originally opened in March 1944, it was originally called the "Línea de los Bulevares" ("Boulevard Line"), with only 8 stations in its original version. Its expansion has occurred exclusively at one end, the eastern end, an atypical peculiarity in the Madrid suburban area. At first, this was produced by absorbing some stations on one of the branches of line 2. Subsequently, new sections were inaugurated as the capital expanded spatially, each incorporating a few stations. The inaugurations of sections in 1973, 1979 and 1998 stood out, making this line grow slowly and progressively. The last group of stations was inaugurated in 2007, more than 60 years after the line's genesis. This long period of time means that the most modern stations (more spacious, functional and accessible for people with reduced mobility) contrast clearly with the older ones (narrower, closed and rarely accessible).

The route of the line is not easy to describe precisely, except in the case of the most central stations. Broadly speaking, its oldest part was characterized by presenting a straight line layout without major technical complications (beyond some pronounced angles), acquiring a more complex and curvilinear shape towards the northeast. The inaugural section begins in the heart of Argüelles, runs along the Alberto Aguilera axis, crosses Paseo de la Castellana and continues along Calle de Goya. Subsequently, the extensions caused the line to run under Conde del Peñalver Street and, after some short windings, take the López de Hoyos axis, in the direction of Hortaleza. Once in this district, it draws its final curve, covering a good part of it, until it reaches Pinar de Chamartín. Thus, the line has stations in the districts of Moncloa-Aravaca, Chamberí, Centro, Salamanca, Chamartín, Ciudad Lineal and Hortaleza, all of which are located in tariff zone A.

== History ==
Line 4 originally opened on 23 March 1944 between Goya and Argüelles.

In 1958, the line took up a branch of what is now Line 2 from Goya to Diego de León, which originally opened on 17 September 1932. In the 1970s, the line was extended in two stages: from Diego de León to Alfonso XIII in 1973, and later to Esperanza in 1979.

On 1 April 1998, the line was extended from Esperanza to Mar de Cristal, allowing for a connection with the newly opened Line 8. Later that year on 15 December, the line was extended to Parque de Santa María. On 11 April 2007, an extension further to the current terminus at Pinar de Chamartin opened. At this station, passengers can transfer to Line 1 as well as Metro Ligero Line 1 (ML-1). This station uses an island platform is for departures and a side platform for arrivals.

== Rolling stock ==
Line 4 has used four-car trains of the CAF class 3400 since 2007.

== Stations ==
District	Station	Opened	Zone	Connections
Ciudad Lineal	Pinar de Chamartín	2007	A	Madrid Metro: Metro Ligero:
Hortaleza	Manoteras	2007	A	
Hortaleza	Hortaleza	2007	A	
Hortaleza	Parque de Santa María	1998	A	
Hortaleza	San Lorenzo	1998	A	
Hortaleza	Mar de Cristal	1998	A	Madrid Metro:
Hortaleza	Canillas	1998	A	
Hortaleza	Esperanza	1979	A	
Ciudad Lineal	Arturo Soria	1979	A	
Ciudad Lineal / Chamartín	Avenida de la Paz	1979	A	
Chamartín	Alfonso XIII	1973	A	
Chamartín	Prosperidad	1973	A	
Chamartín / Salamanca	Avenida de América	1973	A	Madrid Metro:
Salamanca	Diego de León	1932	A	Madrid Metro:
Salamanca	Lista	1932	A	
Salamanca	Goya	1924	A	Madrid Metro:
Salamanca	Velázquez	1944	A	
Salamanca	Serrano	1944	A	
Centro / Chamberí	Colón	1944	A	
Centro / Chamberí	Alonso Martínez	1944	A	Madrid Metro:
Centro / Chamberí	Bilbao	1919	A	Madrid Metro:
Centro / Chamberí	San Bernardo	1925	A	Madrid Metro:
Centro / Chamberí / Moncloa-Aravaca	Argüelles	1941	A	Madrid Metro:

== See also ==
- Madrid
- Transport in Madrid
- List of Madrid Metro stations
- List of metro systems
