= Fuente de la Mora (Madrid Metro) =

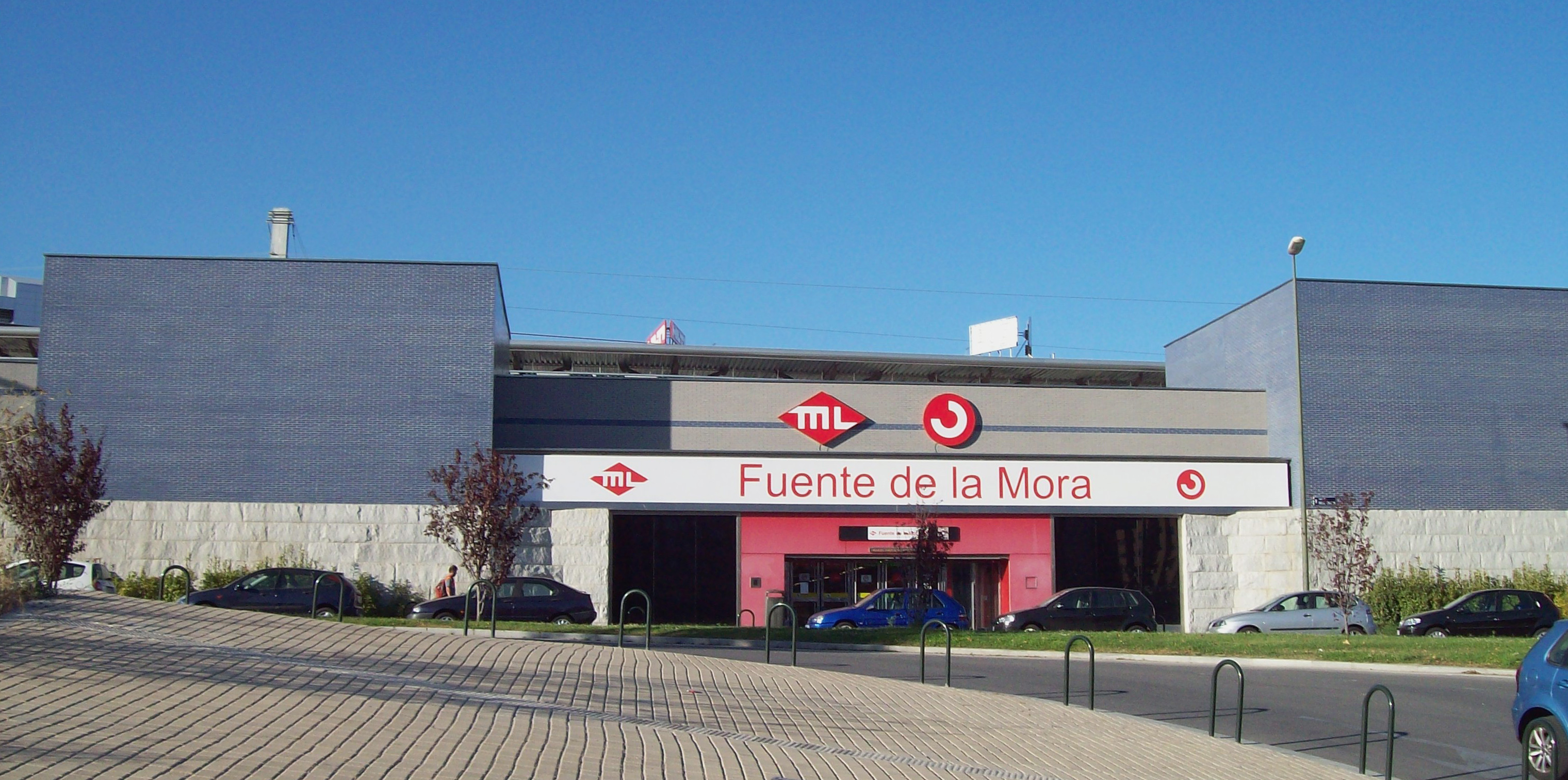

General information
- Location: Hortaleza, Madrid; Spain
- Coordinates: 40.4846851°N 3.6631068°W
- System: Madrid Metro station
- Owner: CRTM
- Operator: CRTM

Other information
- Fare zone: A

History
- Opened: 24 May 2007; 19 years ago

Services
Preceding station	Madrid Metro	Following station
Pinar de Chamartín Terminus	Line ML-1	Virgen del Cortijo towards Las Tablas
Preceding station	Cercanías Madrid	Following station
Chamartín towards Príncipe Pío	C-1	Valdebebas towards Aeropuerto T4
Chamartín Terminus	C-2 CIVIS	San Fernando de Henares towards Guadalajara
Location
- Location within Madrid

Fuente de la Mora [ˈfwente ðe la ˈmoɾa] is a station on Line 1 of the Metro Ligero. It is located in fare Zone A.
