= Parque de Santa María (Madrid Metro) =

Madrid Metro station

- Platforms of the station

General information
- Location: Hortaleza, Madrid; Spain
- Coordinates: 40.4771155°N 3.6452396°W
- System: Madrid Metro station
- Owner: CRTM
- Operator: CRTM

Construction
- Structure type: Underground
- Accessible: Yes

Other information
- Fare zone: A

History
- Opened: 15 December 1998; 27 years ago

Services
Preceding station	Madrid Metro	Following station
San Lorenzo towards Argüelles	Line 4	Hortaleza towards Pinar de Chamartín
Location
- Location within Madrid

Parque de Santa María ([ˈpaɾke ðe ˈsanta maˈɾi.a], "St. Mary's Park," named for the nearby Parroquia Santa María del Parque) is a station on Line 4 of the Madrid Metro. It is located in fare Zone A.
