= Esperanza (Madrid Metro) =

Madrid Metro station

- Platforms of the station

General information
- Location: Hortaleza, Madrid; Spain
- Coordinates: 40.4594456°N 3.6458138°W
- System: Madrid Metro station
- Owner: CRTM
- Operator: CRTM

Construction
- Structure type: Underground
- Accessible: No

Other information
- Fare zone: A

History
- Opened: 4 January 1979; 47 years ago

Services
Preceding station	Madrid Metro	Following station
Arturo Soria towards Argüelles	Line 4	Canillas towards Pinar de Chamartín
Location
- Location within Madrid

Esperanza [espeˈɾanθa] is a metro station on Line 4 of the Madrid Metro. It is located in fare Zone A. It is named for the Esperanza ("Hope") housing development.

Manu Chao's 2001 album Próxima Estación: Esperanza is named after the metro station.
