= Arturo Soria (Madrid Metro) =

Madrid Metro station

- Platform of the station

General information
- Location: Ciudad Lineal, Madrid; Spain
- Coordinates: 40.4558288°N 3.6561813°W
- System: Madrid Metro station
- Owner: CRTM
- Operator: CRTM

Construction
- Structure type: Underground
- Accessible: No

Other information
- Fare zone: A

History
- Opened: 4 January 1979; 47 years ago

Services
Preceding station	Madrid Metro	Following station
Avenida de la Paz towards Argüelles	Line 4	Esperanza towards Pinar de Chamartín
Location
- Location within Madrid

Arturo Soria [aɾˈtuɾo ˈsoɾja] is a station on Line 4 of the Madrid Metro. It is located on the calle Arturo Soria, named for the urban planner Arturo Soria y Mata (1844–1920). It is located in fare Zone A.
