= San Lorenzo (Madrid Metro) =

Madrid Metro station

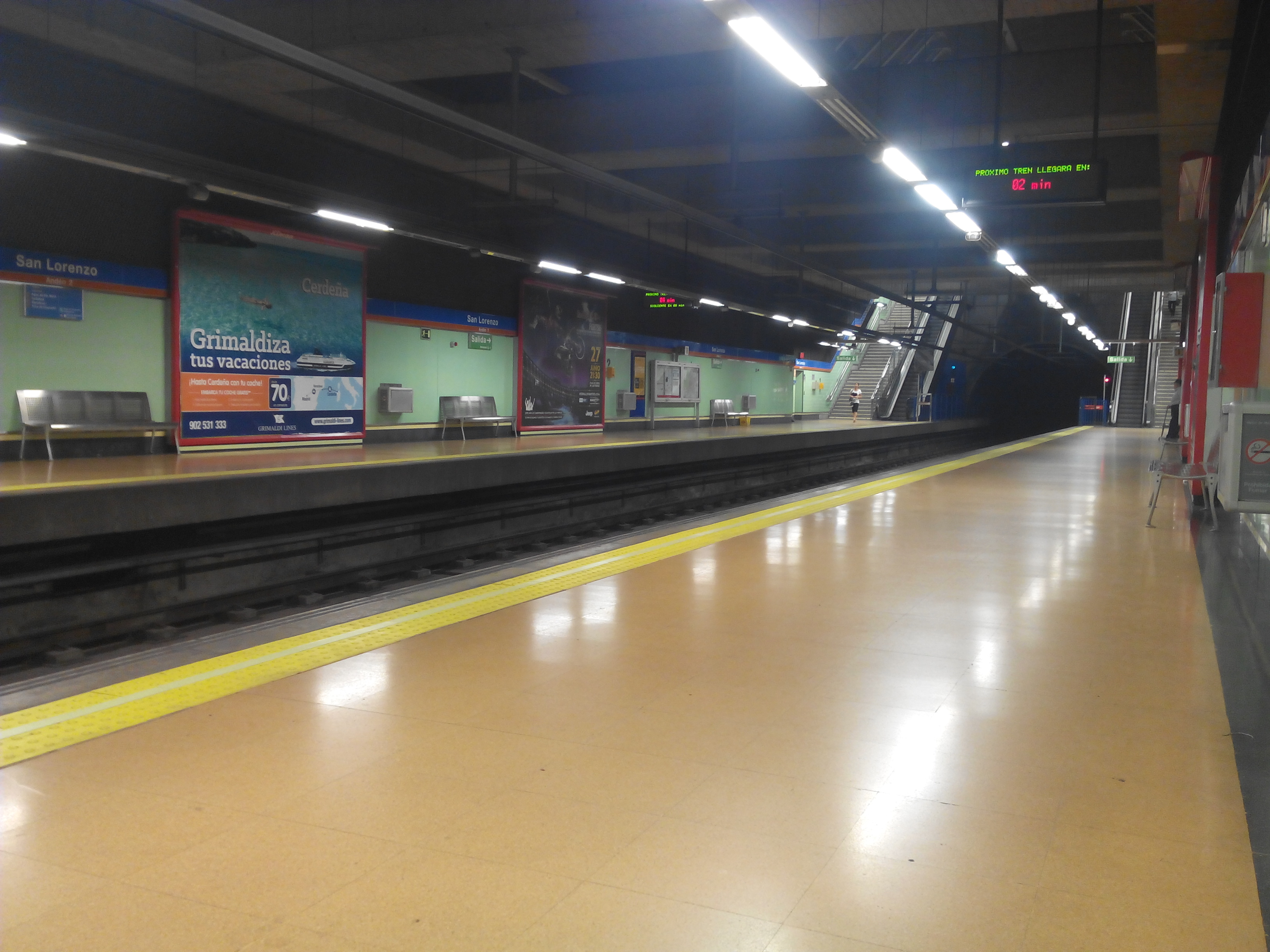

General information
- Location: Hortaleza, Madrid; Spain
- Coordinates: 40.4744713°N 3.6395754°W
- System: Madrid Metro station
- Owner: CRTM
- Operator: CRTM

Construction
- Structure type: Underground
- Accessible: Yes

Other information
- Fare zone: A

History
- Opened: 15 December 1998; 27 years ago

Services
| Preceding station | Madrid Metro | Following station |
|---|---|---|
| Mar de Cristal towards Argüelles | Line 4 | Parque de Santa María towards Pinar de Chamartín |
Location
- Location within Madrid

San Lorenzo [ˈsan loˈɾenθo] is a station on Line 4 of the Madrid Metro, located in the barrio of San Lorenzo. It is located in fare Zone A.
