= Avenida de la Paz (Madrid Metro) =

Madrid Metro station

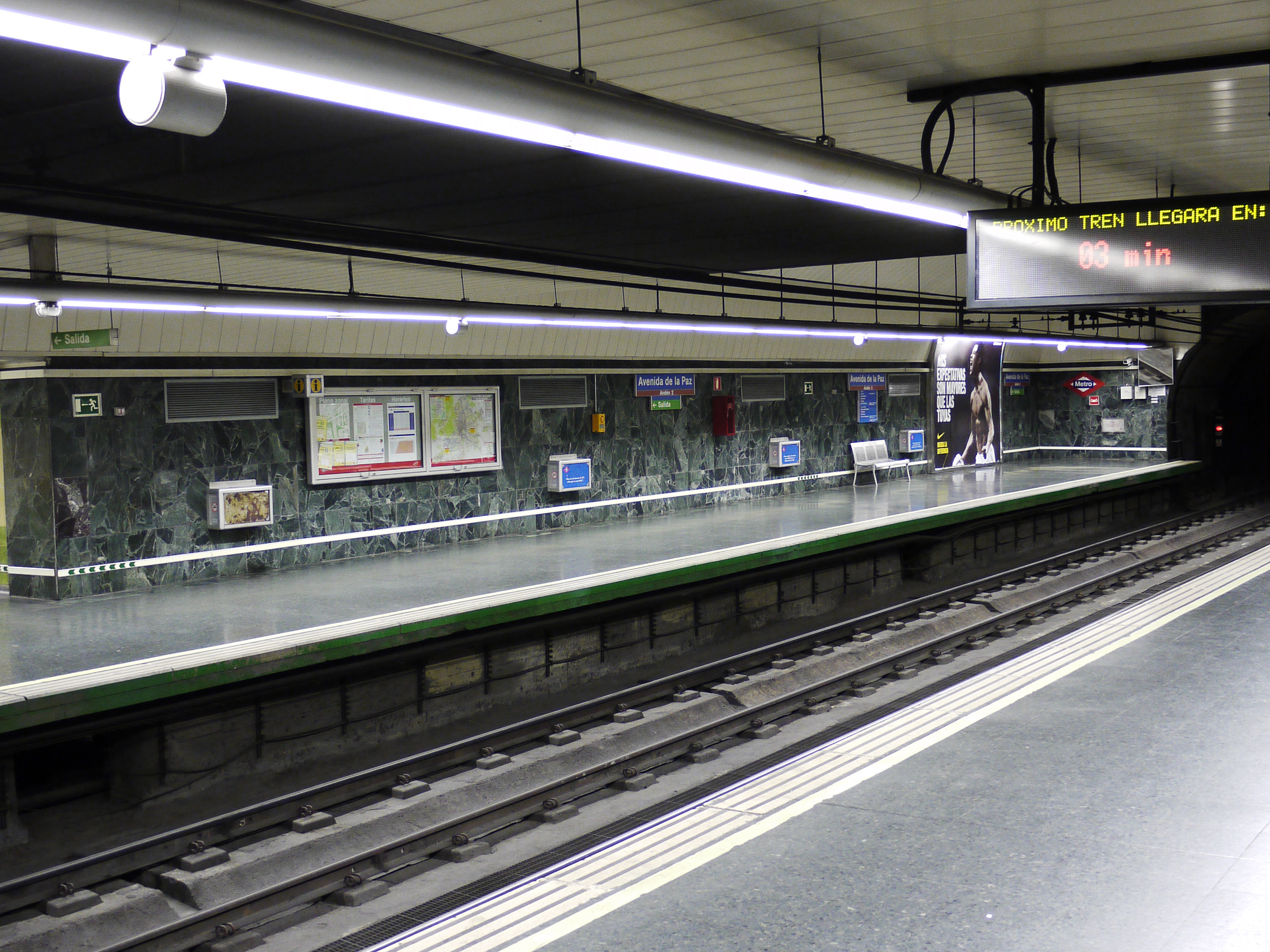

General information
- Location: Chamartín / Ciudad Lineal, Madrid; Spain
- Coordinates: 40.453539°N 3.661183°W
- System: Madrid Metro station
- Owner: CRTM
- Operator: CRTM

Construction
- Structure type: Underground
- Accessible: No

Other information
- Fare zone: A

History
- Opened: 4 January 1979; 47 years ago

Services
Preceding station	Madrid Metro	Following station
Alfonso XIII towards Argüelles	Line 4	Arturo Soria towards Pinar de Chamartín
Location
- Location within Madrid

Avenida de la Paz ([aβeˈniða ðe la ˈpaθ]; "Peace Avenue") is a station on Line 4 of the Madrid Metro. It is located in fare Zone A.
