= A Theory of ISIS =

2017 book by Mohamed Mahmoud Ould Mohamedou

- Cover of the 2017 Pluto Books edition
- Author: Mohamed Mahmoud Ould Mohamedou
- Language: English
- Publisher: Pluto Press
- Publication date: 2017

A Theory of ISIS is a 2017 book by political historian Mohamed Mahmoud Ould Mohamedou which argues that the Islamic State constituted an original and hybrid form of political violence that merged post-colonialism, post-modernity, and post-globalisation thus impacting domestic, regional, and global politics and security. It is the first scholarly attempt at conceptualizing and historicizing the Islamic State armed group. It was published in hardback and paperback in the United Kingdom by Pluto Press in October 2017, and in the United States by the University of Chicago Press in February 2018, in hardback and paperback.

== Arguments and themes ==
Highlighting the importance of periodization and spatialization in writing histories of political violence, the book argues that a layered "conceptual geology of IS" holds the key to its understanding, and is to be found in three different but related dimensions: first, a continuation of the earlier armed radical Islamist group Al-Qaeda and that group's regional context; second, degenerated political developments in Iraq in the aftermath of the 2003 invasion of Iraq by the US and the Syrian civil war after 2011; and, third, the wider rise of a novel type of political violence linked to resurgent practices of the colonial era and military interventionism. The book concludes that the latter dimension constitutes the most important legacy of the group, and that such post-modern violence is more anchored in the Western metropolis than in the battlefields of Afghanistan, Iraq, and Syria. The book examines the place the Islamic State occupies in contemporary international history and politics. It critiques the dominant existing literature on the group, and more generally on radical Islamism as lacking historical contextualization and historical conceptualization – specifically focus on the religiosity of the armed group, which Mohamedou calls "ornamental and theatrical". In that regard, the book stands in contrast to works on the Islamic State and on Al-Qaeda by authors such as Gilles Kepel, Lawrence Wright, and Fawaz Gerges, sharing more ground with the analyses of Mahmood Mamdani, Faisal Devji and François Burgat.

== Trilogy ==
The book is part of a trilogy by Mohamedou on the geopolitical implications of the September 11, 2001 terrorist attacks, examining the events and their aftermath on international relations and transnational forms of political violence. The first volume, Contre-Croisade – Le 11 Septembre et le Retournement du Monde was published by L'Harmattan (Paris) in 2004 (under the title Contre-Croisade – Origines et Conséquences du 11 Septembre) with an expanded edition in 2011.The second volume, Understanding Al Qaeda – The Transformation of War was published in 2007 by Pluto Press in the United Kingdom and the University of Michigan Press in the United States, with an expanded edition in 2011 under the title Understanding Al Qaeda – Changing War and Global Politics.

== Publication history ==
- ISBN 978-0-7453-9909-6 (paperback)
- ISBN 978-0-7453-9911-9 (hardcover)
- ISBN 978-1-78680-169-2 (available through Open Access)
