= Association Sportive Amicale =

Football club in Spain active between 1897 and 1904

- Full name: Association Sportive Amicale
- Short name: AS Amicale
- Founded: 1897
- Dissolved: April 1902
- Ground: Lycée Français de Madrid
- Chairman: William MacAndrews
- League: Centro championship

The Association Sportive Amicale was a football team based in Madrid, Spain, which was founded in 1897 and dissolved in 1904 after being absorbed by Madrid FC. It was founded by students at the Lycée Français de Madrid under the name Association Sportive Française, and together with Sky Foot-Ball Club, it was the first pioneer of football in the Madrid region.

== Beginnings ==
The club was born in 1897, in parallel to the creation of the Sky Football Club, possibly due to the relationship between the students of the French Lyceum and those from the Institución Libre de Enseñanza. The name chosen was Association Sportive Française.

Due to the limited extension of the said sport in the country, there were still no proper venues for its practice, so the enthusiastic players were distributed by different vacant lots and areas of the city in which the players themselves arrived early to paint the lines of the field and prepare the goals to be able to play their matches, but mainly they were held at the Lycée Français de Madrid.

In 1902 it changed its name to the Association Sportive Amicale, becoming commonly known as the Amicale.

== Decline and Collapse ==
Madrid FC's loss in the 1903 Copa del Rey Final caused a convulsive situation within the entity that led to the departure of several of its founding and most important members. The split was led by the Giralt brothers (Mario, José and Armando) and Antonio Neyra, who then refounded the Club Español de Madrid in late 1903. This put Madrid in a very difficult situation as they were suffering from a lack of players. AS Amicale was also struggling, so the directors of Madrid FC, Juan and Carlos Padrós proposed them, an agreement that could benefit everyone: a merger. Amicale accepted in order to survive, and so, on 30 January 1904, Madrid FC absorbed both the French team and Moderno Football Club, emerging as Madrid-Moderno Football Club (Moderno required to impose its name in the new name of the club), the name under which it competed in the 1903–04 Centro Championship, which they won. Thus, AS Amicale was another of the clubs that made it possible for Madrid FC to continue growing. Carlos Padrós was elected president post-merger.

== Notable players ==
Among the ranks of AS Amicale, the figure of Dagniere and Pedro Parages stood out, especially the latter, who joined the discipline of Madrid FC and had a great influence on its future development and successes, even netting twice in the 1906 Copa del Rey Final to help his side to a 4–1 win over Athletic Bilbao. Parages even came to preside the club as its fifth historical president.
