= Prosperidad (Madrid Metro) =

Madrid Metro station

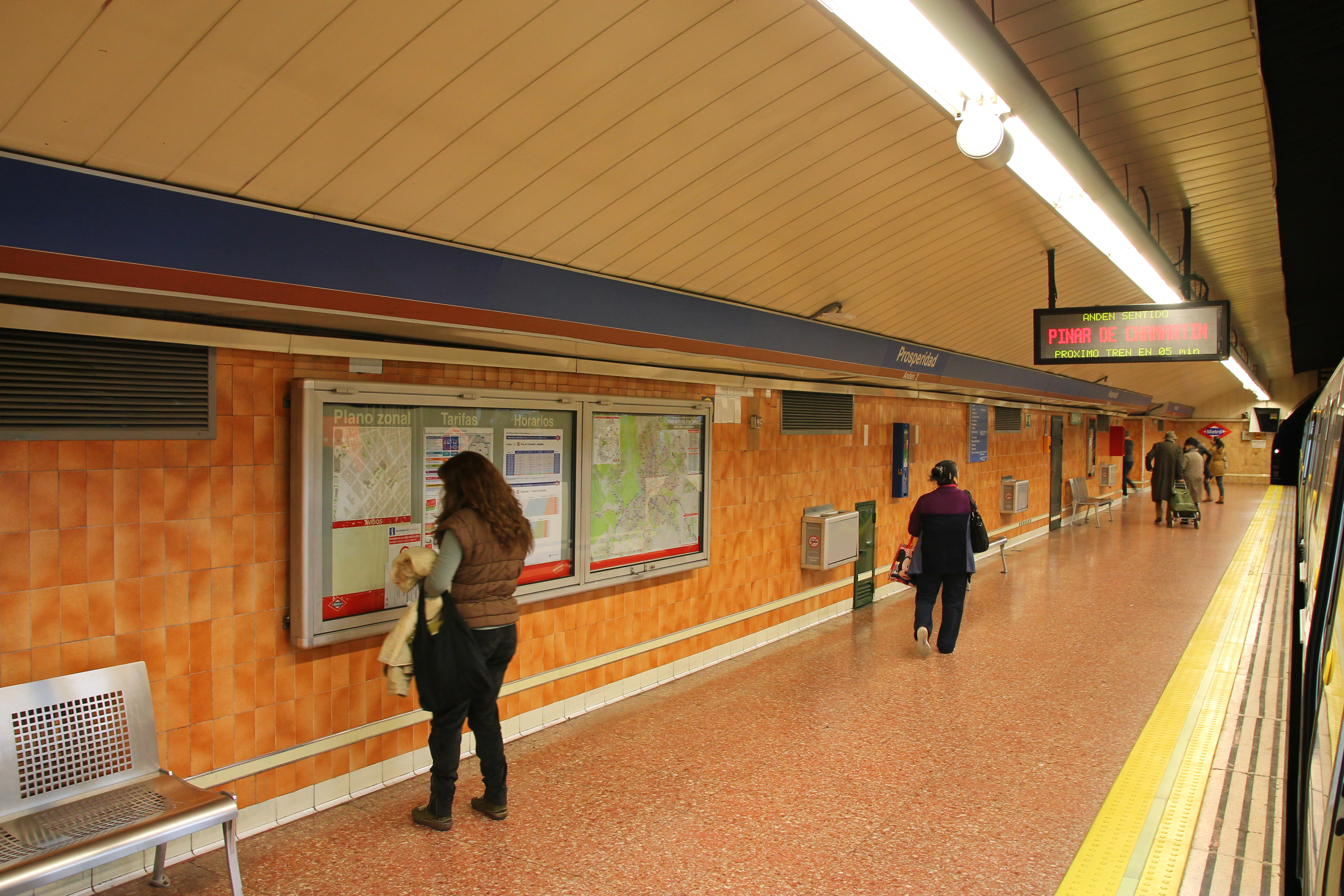

General information
- Location: Chamartín, Madrid; Spain
- Coordinates: 40.4441899°N 3.6748168°W
- System: Madrid Metro station
- Owner: CRTM
- Operator: CRTM

Construction
- Structure type: Underground
- Accessible: No

Other information
- Fare zone: A

History
- Opened: 26 March 1973; 53 years ago

Services
Preceding station	Madrid Metro	Following station
Avenida de América towards Argüelles	Line 4	Alfonso XIII towards Pinar de Chamartín
Location
- Location within Madrid

Prosperidad [pɾospeɾiˈðað] is a station on Line 4 of the Madrid Metro, located under the Plaza Prosperidad ("Prosperity Square"). It is located in fare Zone A.
