= Ventas =

Ventas may refer to:

- Ventas (company), a real estate investment trust (REIT), invests primarily in real estate serving the United States healthcare industry
- Ventas (Madrid), a ward (barrio) of Madrid, Spain belonging to the district of Ciudad Lineal
  - Ventas (Madrid Metro), a station on Line 2 and 5
- Ventas de Zafarraya, a village in Grenada, Spain
