= Costillares (Madrid) =

Coordinates: 40.4744°N 3.6697°W

- Ward of Madrid
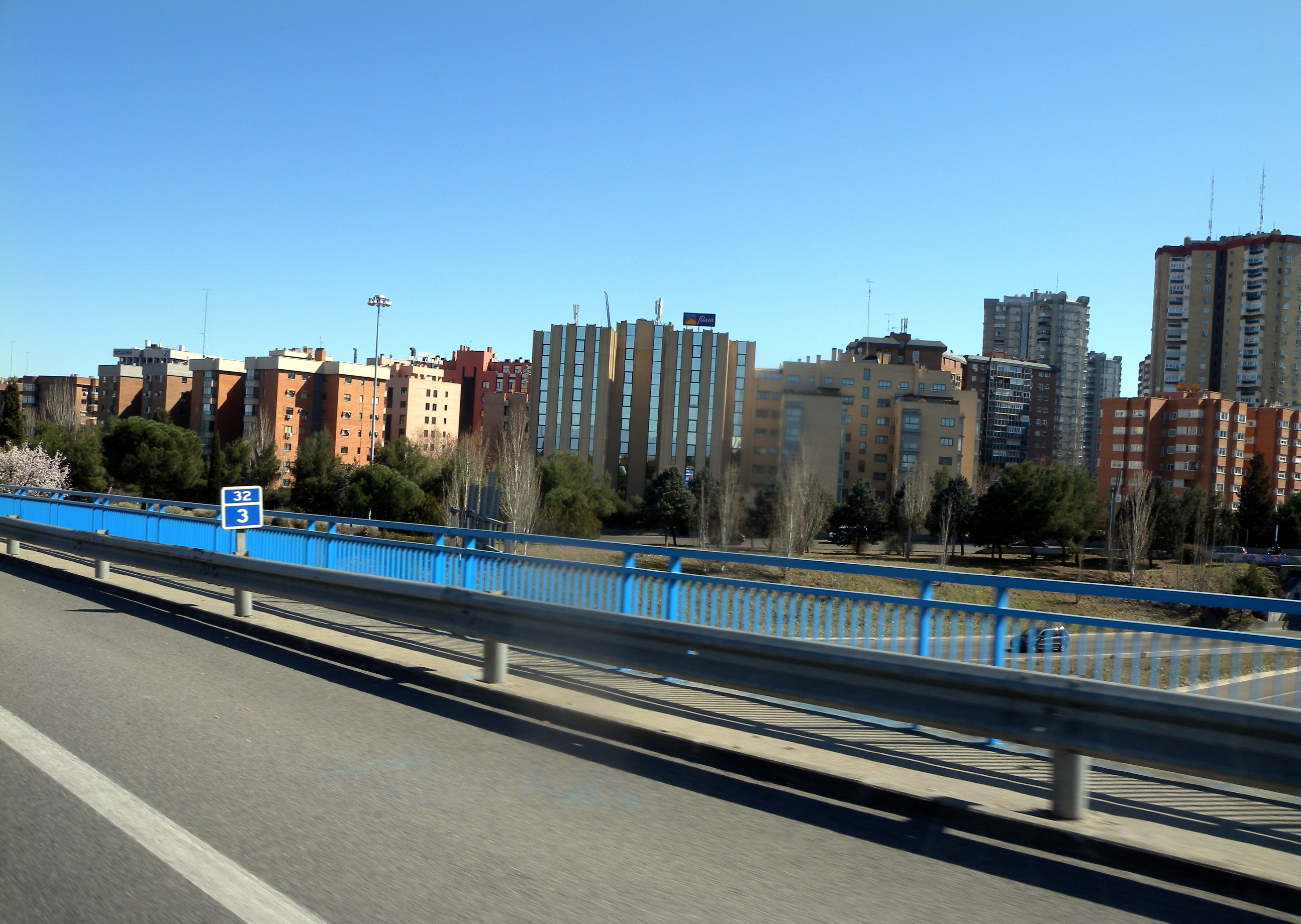
- Interactive map of Costillares
- Country: Spain
- Autonomous community: Madrid
- Municipality: Madrid
- District: Ciudad Lineal

Area
  - Total: 1.409 km^{2} (0.544 sq mi)

Population (2015)
  - Total: 18,601
  - Density: 13,198/km^{2} (34,180/sq mi)

Costillares [kostiˈʝaɾes], also known as Pinar de Chamartín [piˈnaɾ ðe tʃamaɾˈtin], is a neighborhood part of the Ciudad Lineal district, in north Madrid, Spain.

== Neighborhood ==
The neighborhood has 18,601 residents. It is named for a pinar (a small forest of pine trees) near the larger district of Chamartín. The current-day neighborhood, however, is located within the district of Ciudad Lineal.

== Station ==
The station is the terminus for Line 1, Line 4 and the Metro Ligero line 1. As the 1 is one of the most important lines in all of Madrid, the 4 serves the local area of Hortaleza, and the ML1 serves the nearby Cercanías station in the new and expanding neighborhood of Sanchinarro, this station sees a high amount of traffic for being in a relatively low-population neighborhood far removed from the city center.

The station appears in the movie Doctor Zhivago and the neighborhood appears in the Spanish-language movie La cabina.
