= Alfonso XIII (disambiguation) =

Alfonso XIII (1886–1941) was a king of Spain.

Alfonso XIII may refer to:

- Spanish cruiser Alfonso XIII, a Spanish Navy cruiser of the late 19th and early 20th centuries
- Spanish battleship Alfonso XIII, a Spanish Navy dreadnought battleship in commission from 1915 to 1937
- Alfonso XIII (Madrid Metro), a station on the Madrid Metro
- Alfonso XIII Tunnel, one of the Vielha Tunnels in north-west Catalonia
