= Concepción (Madrid) =

Coordinates: 40°26′25″N 3°38′53″W

- Ward of Madrid
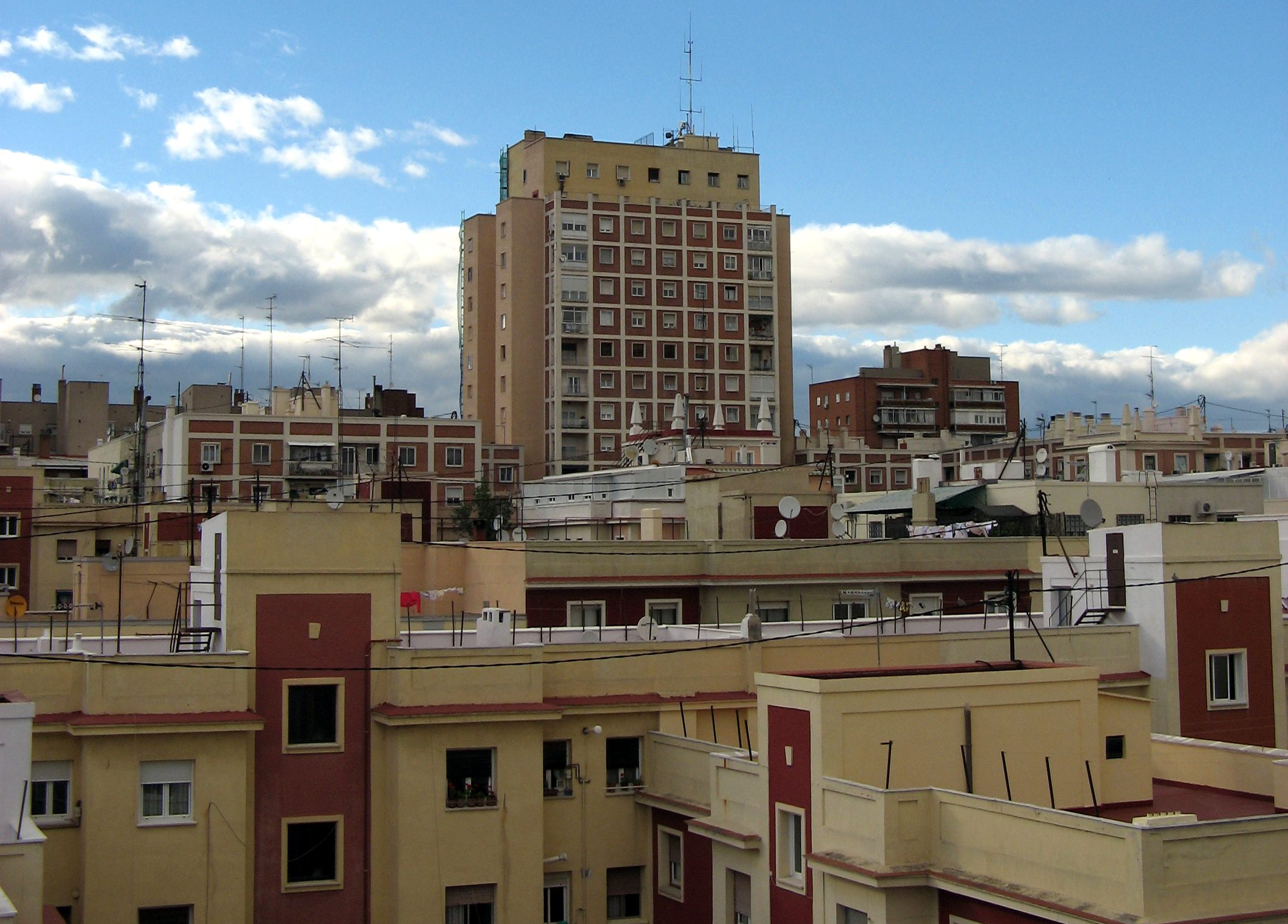
- Interactive map of Concepción
- Country: Spain
- Autonomous community: Madrid
- Municipality: Madrid
- District: Ciudad Lineal

Concepción is a ward (barrio) of Madrid belonging to the district of Ciudad Lineal.
