= Manoteras =

Area of Madrid, Spain

Manoteras is an area of northern Madrid in Spain. It belongs to the district of Hortaleza and the administrative district of Apóstol Santiago. It is situated between the residential areas of Pinar de Chamartin, El Bosque and Sanchinarro.

Manoteras is near the financial city CTBA, Valdebebas Park, Arturo Soria Street, Chamartín station and the hospitals of La Paz, Ramon y Cajal, La Moraleja and Madrid Norte. It has two principal green areas, which are the parks of Doña Guiomar and Manoteras.

The highway by which to access Manoteras is the M-11, which connects it to the east with the International Airport of Madrid and the highway M-40, and to the west with the highways M-30, A-1 and M-607.

The district has municipal transport to the center of Madrid and Hortaleza by bus and metro.
