= Mohamed Mahmoud Ould Mohamedou =

Mauritanian diplomat (1968–2024)

- محمد محمود ولد محمدو
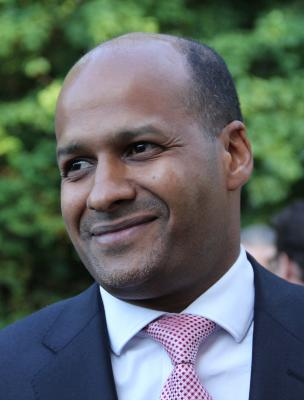
- Mohamedou in 2020

Political historian

Personal details
- Born: 3 April 1968 Atar, Mauritania
- Died: 17 September 2024 (aged 56)
- Education: University of Paris 1 Panthéon-Sorbonne; Harvard University
- Alma mater: CUNY Graduate Center
- Profession: Historian
- Known for: Understanding Al Qaeda, A Theory of ISIS, Contre-Croisade, Iraq and the Second Gulf War
- Awards: International Studies Association Global South Distinguished Scholar 2020-2021; College de France

Mohamed Mahmoud Ould Mohamedou (Arabic: محمد محمود ولد محمدو; 3 April 1968 – 17 September 2024) was a Mauritanian diplomat, political historian and public intellectual. A Harvard University academic, Mohamedou was professor of international history and politics at the Graduate Institute of International and Development Studies in Geneva. His work focused on political violence, state-building, racism, and the history of international relations.

Mohamedou was a member of the Centre on Conflict, Development and Peacebuilding and the Albert Hirschman Centre on Democracy and was regarded as a leading international expert on the new forms of transnational terrorism. Mohamedou was also a visiting professor at Sciences Po Paris in the Doctoral School. Before this he served as the deputy director and academic dean of the Geneva Center for Security Policy. He served as Minister of Foreign Affairs and Cooperation of Mauritania from 2008 until 2009.

== Biography ==
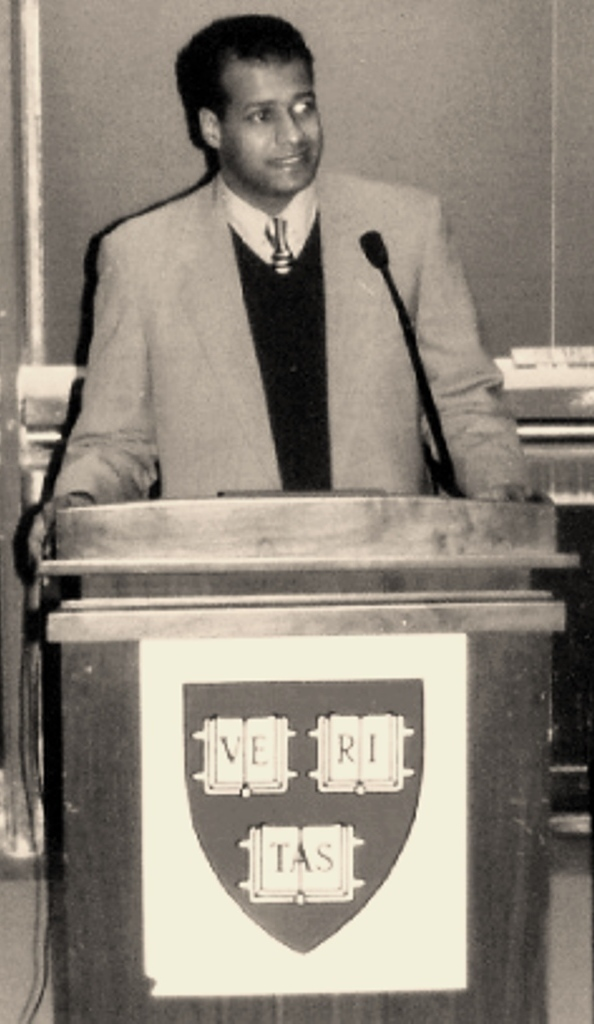
Mohammad-Mahmoud Ould Mohamedou in 1997, Harvard University

Mohamedou was born in Atar, Mauritania on 3 April 1968. He grew up in Paris, Madrid, and New York where his father was Ambassador at the United Nations. In Spain, he studied at the Lycée Français de Madrid where he obtained his Baccalaureate in Economic and Social Sciences in 1986. In France, he received a Diplome d'Etudes Universitaires Generales (DEUG) in International Law at the Pantheon-Sorbonne University Paris I in 1988. In the United States, he earned a Bachelor in International Relations at Hunter College in New York in 1991. He then obtained a Master's in International Relations in 1993 and a Ph.D. in political science at the City University of New York Graduate Center in 1996. There he studied with Arthur Schlesinger, Dankwart Rustow, Ralph Miliband, Irving Leonard Markowitz, Jacqueline Braveboy-Wagner, Stanley Renshon, Kenneth Sherrill, and Kenneth Erickson. Supervised by Howard Lentner, his doctoral dissertation was on "State-Building and Regime Security: A Study of Iraq's Decision-Making Process during the 1991 Second Gulf War". In 1997, he was a Post-doctoral Scholar at the Center for Middle Eastern Studies of Harvard University working with Roger Owen, and in 1998 was appointed Research Associate at the Ralph Bunche Institute on the United Nations in New York, then directed by Benjamin Rivlin.

Mohamedou was Director of Research at the International Council on Human Rights Policy, located in Geneva, from 1998 to 2004, where he oversaw research on national human rights institutions, and media coverage of human rights. He co-authored two reports on the persistence and mutation of racism and on racial and economic exclusion., which were presented at the World Conference on Racism in Durban, South Africa in September 2001.

From 2004 to 2008, Mohamedou was associate director of the Program on Humanitarian Policy and Conflict Research at Harvard University where he founded the Transnational and Non-State Armed Groups Project.

He was appointed ambassador and director of multilateral cooperation at the Ministry of Foreign Affairs and Cooperation in Mauritania in 2008, and subsequently minister of foreign affairs and cooperation. He went back to academia in 2009.

Mohamedou taught in the International History and Politics Department of the Graduate Institute of International and Development Studies in Geneva from 2010, and was chair of that department from 2017 to 2021. He was deputy director and director of executive education at the Graduate Institute of International and Development Studies. He was deputy director and academic dean of the Geneva Centre for Security Policy from 2014 to 2017. He was a lecturer at the Doctoral School at Sciences Po Paris from 2013 and taught summer schools at the London School of Economics and Political Science. Mohamedou was visiting professor at the University of Milan in 2014–2017. He sat on the scientific committee of the Middle East Programme of the European University Institute and on the editorial board of the journals Relations Internationales, Middle East Law and Governance, Etudes Internationales, and Politics and Governance.

From 2014, he was a commissioner in the West Africa Commission on Drugs (WACD) appointed by former United Nations Secretary General Kofi Annan, and, from 2017, a member of the High-Level Panel on Migration set up by the United Nations Economic Commission for Africa (UNECA) and the African Union.

Mohamedou died after a long illness in Geneva, Switzerland, on 17 September 2024, at the age of 56.

== As an author ==
Mohamedou wrote an influential book on Al Qaeda entitled Understanding Al Qaeda: The Transformation of War which was published in 2006 (in the United Kingdom) by Pluto Press, and 2007 (in the United States) by the University of Pennsylvania Press. An expanded and revised version retitled Understanding Al Qaeda: Changing War and Global Politics was released in 2011.

Reviews of the book highlighted its innovative nature, "refreshing and rational" approach, and sharp language reminiscent of critical theorist Slavoj Žižek. Columbia University's Mahmood Mamdani has noted that "Mohamedou provides a much-needed secular understanding of Al Qaeda. Unlike most writers, he insists on understanding the changing significance of Al Qaeda's discourse against a historical backdrop", while Emory University's Abdullahi An-Naim pointed out Mohamedou's "sober analysis" as "essential reading". One reviewer noted that: "[Mohamedou] has presented an entirely new perspective on the subject. This makes the book a must read, for scholars as well as students of international politics." Indeed, Mohamedou's insistence on treating Al Qaeda as a political rather than religious group has led to his characterization as "perhaps the first liberal to attempt a fully secular understanding of Al Qaeda".

In 2017, Mohamedou expanded his analysis of Al Qaeda by examining the case of the Islamic State in A Theory of ISIS: Political Violence and the Transformation of the Global Order. Published by Pluto Press in the United Kingdom and by the University of Chicago Press in the United States, this book offered the first full academic conceptualization and historicization of ISIS. Professor Hamid Dabashi of Columbia University called it "a ground-breaking work of political theory." Reviews of the book noted that "Mohamedou's work fills a gap... [and] his critical outlook on the existent literature on IS provides a novel take on the emergence and decline of the group. Mohamedou provides a unique, historically contextualized vantage point from which to understand the reasons for the rise of IS... a significant contribution to terrorism research.". Others pointed out the book as a "refreshingly nuanced text...[an] essential reading to anyone who wishes to understand the ISIS phenomenon beyond the day-to-day military and national security thinking which has come to dominate much discussion regarding the group...This forcing of thought and reflection is Mohamedou’s greatest strength". Mohamedou "offers a convincing take on the genesis, nature, and trajectory of what was for a time the most powerful terrorist group in the world. In doing so, [he] brings the social sciences into a conceptualization of the so-called Islamic State, beyond its specific geopolitical and radical Islamist nature.".

Mohamedou was also the author of Iraq and the Second Gulf War: State-Building and Regime Security. Originally published in 1998 by Austin & Winfeld in San Francisco and reprinted in 2002, that book has been considered "a model for further studies on the Gulf War".

In French, Mohamedou wrote Contre-Croisade: Origines et Conséquences du 11 Septembre, an in-depth investigation of the events leading up to and after the 11 September attacks, which was published by l'Harmattan in Paris in 2004 and reissued in 2011 under the title Contre-Croisade: Le 11 Septembre et le Retournement du Monde. An Arabic version was published in 2010.

Mohamedou contributed chapters to other books, notably The Handbook of Political Science: A Global Perspective (Sage, 2020) The Routledge Handbook of South-South Relations (Routledge, 2019), Orientalismes/Occidentalismes: A Propos de L'Oeuvre d'Edward Said (Hermann, 2018), The UN and the Global South, 1945 and 2015 (Routledge, 2017), Minding the Gap: African Conflict Management in a Time of Change (CIGI, 2016), La Guerre au Mali (La Découverte, 2013), The Role of the Arab-Islamic World in the Rise of the West (Palgrave, 2012), Violent Non-State Actors in Contemporary World Politics (Columbia University Press, 2010), Rethinking the Foreign Policies of the Global South – Seeking Conceptual Frameworks (Lynne Reinner, 2003), and Governance, and Democratization in the Middle East (Avebury Press, 1998).

Mohamedou published journal articles in the Third World Quarterly, the Harvard Human Rights Journal, Relations Internationales, La Revue Internationale et Strategique, Esprit, The Muslim World, Europe's World, and The Buffalo Human Rights Review,

Among his most influential works was a study on the mutation of the modern forms of war and the rise of transnational terrorism published by Harvard University in 2005 entitled "Non-Linearity of Engagement", from which an op-ed was derived and published in The New York Times and The Boston Globe.

Updating Martin Van Creveld's 1991 "The Transformation of War" and Herfried Munkler's 2005 "The New Wars", Mohamedou's work has been hailed as one of the latter-day most insightful and detached scientific analysis of Al Qaeda, examining in particular the mechanics of its regionalization, franchising, away of what he termed a 'mother Al Qaeda' (Al Qaeda al Oum), and assessing the long-term impact of the new forms of terrorism, 'the militarization of Islamism', and the post-modern and post-colonial nature of ISIS.

Mohamedou also wrote on democratization issues in other media including Le Monde Le Monde Diplomatique; and Libération appeared on BBC World News, BBC2, Al Jazeera, Al Jazeera English, Voice of America, Radio France Internationale, France 2, France3, France 24 Deutsche Welle, VPRO, Swiss television, Swiss Radio, NECN and ABC News, and has been a guest-blogger on "The Washington Note" writing on post-9/11 US policy and American society, and the Arab Spring. A regular public speaker, Mohamedou served on the advisory council of the Dart Center for Journalism and Adviser to the Small Arms Survey.

== Awards and distinctions ==
In May 2016, New African magazine named Mohamedou among the 50 influential African intellectuals.

In November 2017, the College de France awarded Mohamedou its recognition prize at the occasion of a lecture he delivered at the Amphithéâtre Marguerite de Navarre-Marcelin Berthelot in Paris, France.

He was the 2020–2021 recipient of the International Studies Association (ISA) Global South Caucus Distinguished Scholar Award.

In May 2022, he delivered the Fourth Perspectives Lecture at the Max Planck Foundation for International Peace and the Rule of Law.

== Documentary ==
In December 2018, the television news channel Al Jazeera premiered a documentary entitled Rethinking Extremism. in which the work of Mohamedou is showcased. Directed by Dan Davies of Blackleaf Films, the 26-minute documentary travels around the world with Mohamedou as he meets with scholars, experts, and students to discuss the question of violent extremism. In the documentary, Mohamedou offers a critical look at the securitizing logic at play globally since 9/11, and specifically the police state surveillance architecture and construction of terrorism/violent extremism.

== Notable works ==
- State-Building in the Middle East and North Africa: One Hundred Years of Nationalism, Religion, and Politics (IB Tauris Bloomsbury, 2021)
- A Theory of ISIS: Political Violence and the Transformation of the Global Order (University of Chicago Press and Pluto Press, 2017)
- Understanding Al Qaeda: Changing War and Global Politics (Pluto Press, London 2011)
- Iraq and the Second Gulf War: State-Building and Regime Security (Austin and Winfeld, San Francisco 2002)
- Democratisation in the 21st Century (Routledge, London 2016)
- Contre-Croisade: Le 11 Septembre et le Retournement du Monde (L'Harmattan, Paris 2011)
- The Rise and Fall of Al Qaeda (2011)
- Non-Linearity of Engagement (Harvard University 2005)
- The Challenge of Transnational Non-State Armed Groups (Harvard University 2007)

== Other articles ==
- Harvard Human Rights Journal 20th anniversary special issue
- Harvard Human Rights Journal
- Harvard Gazette
- The Muslim Word
- Le Monde
- Libération
- Terrorism.net
