= Alfonso XIII (Madrid Metro) =

Madrid Metro station

- Platform of the station

General information
- Location: Chamartín, Madrid; Spain
- Coordinates: 40.4482482°N 3.6679119°W
- System: Madrid Metro station
- Owner: CRTM
- Operator: CRTM

Construction
- Structure type: Underground
- Accessible: No

Other information
- Fare zone: A

History
- Opened: 26 March 1973; 53 years ago

Services
| Preceding station | Madrid Metro | Following station |
|---|---|---|
| Prosperidad towards Argüelles | Line 4 | Avenida de la Paz towards Pinar de Chamartín |
Location
- Location within Madrid

Alfonso XIII [alˈfonso ˈtɾeθe] is a station on Line 4 of the Madrid Metro, located near the Avenida de Alfonso XIII ("Alfonso XIII Avenue", called the same as the one that inaugurated the Metro in 1919. It is located in fare Zone A.
