= Quintana (Madrid) =

Ward in Madrid, Spain

Coordinates: 40°26′15″N 3°38′32″W

- Ward
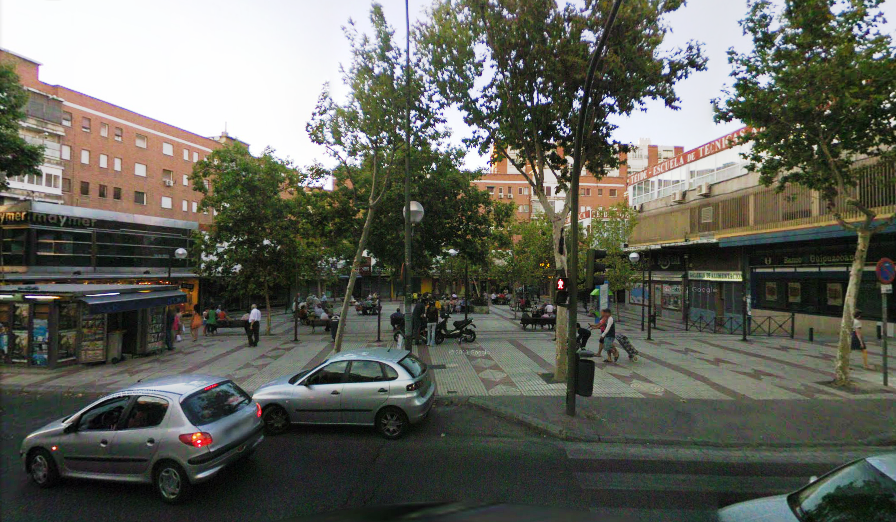
- Country: Spain
- Autonomous community: Madrid
- Municipality: Madrid
- District: Ciudad Lineal

Quintana is a ward (barrio) of Madrid belonging to the district of Ciudad Lineal.
