= Lycée Français de Madrid =

French international school in Madrid, Spain

Coordinates: 40.4575°N 3.6425°W

- Liceo Francés de Madrid

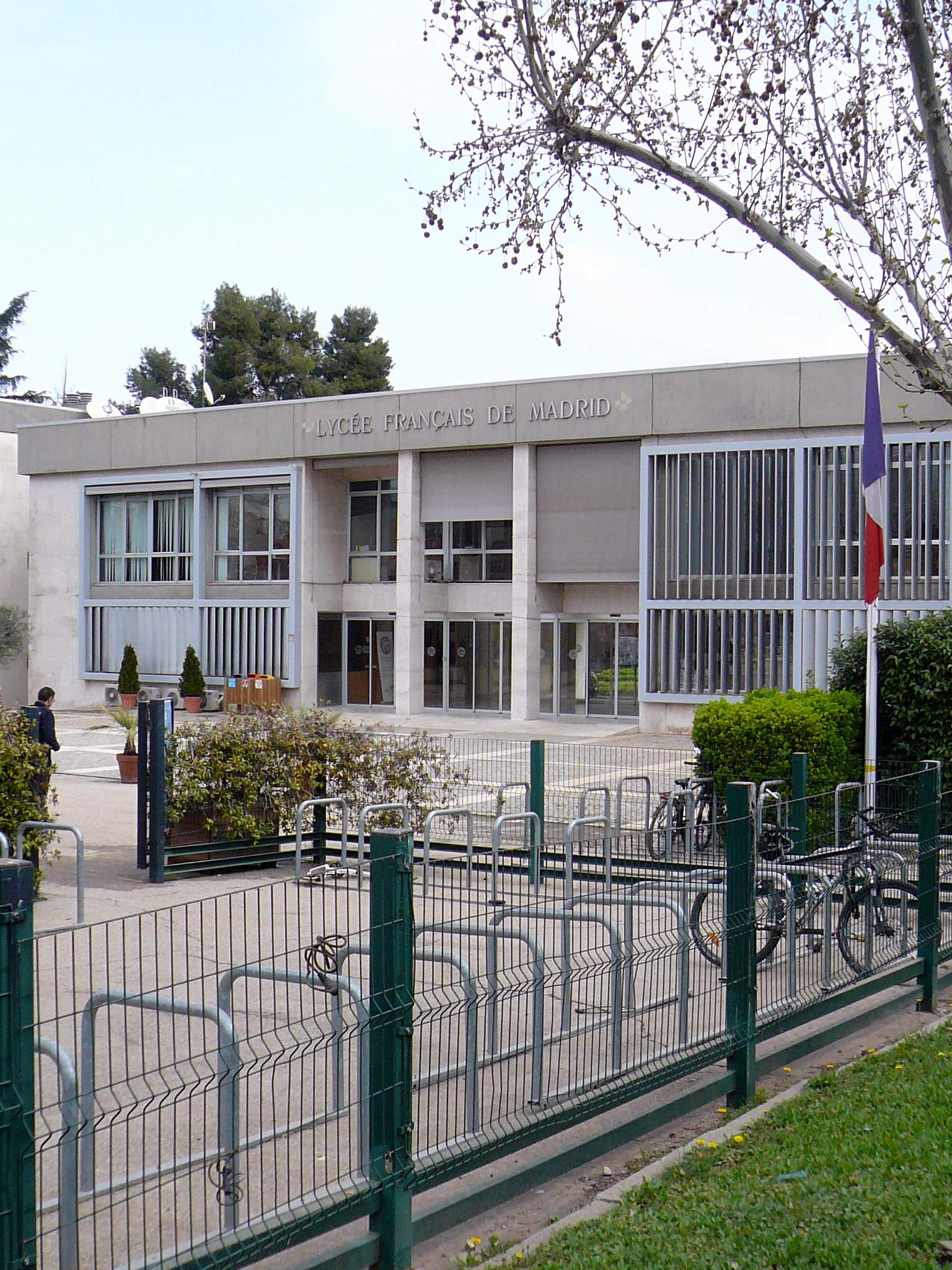
- Conde de Orgaz (Main) campus

Location
- Main: Plaza del Liceo, 1 28043 - Madrid; Saint-Exupéry Campus: Camino Ancho, 85 28109 - Alcobendas Madrid

Information
- Website: lfmadrid.net

Lycée Français de Madrid (LFM, Spanish: Liceo Francés de Madrid) is a French international school in Madrid, Spain. It serves levels maternelle (preschool) through lycée (senior high school). It is directly operated by the Agency for French Education Abroad. It has two campuses: the Conde de Orgaz in Hortaleza, northeast Madrid and Saint-Exupéry in La Moraleja, Alcobendas. As of 2012 it is the world's largest French international school.

== History ==
It was established in an apartment on Calle Santa Isabel in 1885, with 50 students. It previously occupied a campus on Calle Marqués de la Ensenada.

In 1980 the Spanish journalist and writer Enrique Meneses wrote a letter to the editor to El País urging for the school to be saved after an announcement came stating that the school might close due to financial difficulties.

The school celebrated its 125th anniversary in 2011.

== Operations ==
As of 2009 there were 290 teachers and 100 other employees. The French government provides salaries for the teachers.

As of 2009 base tuition was 800 euros per student along with course fees which ranged from 3,700 euros to 4,200 euros per student.

== Campuses ==
The Conde de Orgaz campus was designed by Spanish architect Alfredo Rodriguez Orgaz and two French architects, Pierre Sonrel and Jean Duthilleul. The Conde de Orgaz campus has five libraries, a theatre, athletic facilities, and computer rooms.

Campuses in the Madrid area

== Student body ==
As of 2009 about half of the school's 3,945 students were Spanish and about half came from France and other Francophone countries.

In 2012 the Conde de Orgaz campus had 3,500 students.

As of 2009 the alumni association has over 500 members.

== Athletics ==
The LFM rugby team was established in 1968 by the efforts of Luis Abad "Luison". As of 2012 it was the most common sport among Conde de Orgaz campus students due to rugby's role in the French school curriculum.

== Notable alumni ==
The alumni include actors, economists, and politicians.

- Hiba Abouk - Spanish actress
- José Luis Álvarez - Spanish politician
- Hugues Aufray - French singer
- Miguel Bosé - Spanish musician and actor
- Prince Louis, Duke of Anjou - Legitimist claimant to the French throne
- Miguel Ángel Moratinos - Spanish politician
- Raimundo Saporta - Spanish basketball administrator
- Ramón Tamames - Spanish politician and economist
- Tristán Ulloa - Spanish actor
- Antonio Vega (singer) - Spanish songwriter, singer and composer
- Enzo Zidane - French-Spanish football player and son of former French international player Zinedine Zidane
- Mohamed Mahmoud Ould Mohamedou - Mauritanian Minister of Foreign Affairs, Harvard Scholar and political historian

== See also ==
- Institut français de Madrid
- Liceo Español Luis Buñuel, a Spanish international school near Paris, France
