= François Burgat =

French political scientist

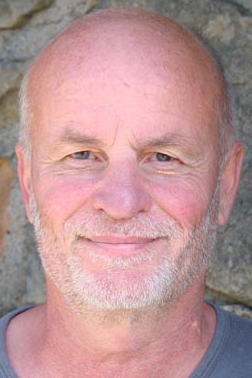
François Burgat

François Burgat, born April 2, 1948, in Chambéry, is a French political scientist and arabist, Research Fellow at the French National Centre for Scientific Research (CNRS) posted at IREMAM (Institut de recherches et d'études sur le monde arabe et musulman) in Aix-en-Provence. He has been the Principal Investigator of the European Research Council research program "When Autoritarism Fails in the Arab World (WAFAW)" (2013-2017).

Having lectured across the world for a wide range of Academic institutions or think tanks such as the World Economic Forum, NATO, the European Union, etc.. He has taught and researched at the University of Constantine, Algeria (1973-1980), at the French CEDEJ in Cairo, Egypt (1989-1993), as the director of the French Centre for Archaeology and Social Sciences in Sana'a, Yemen (1997-2003), then as the director of the Institut Français du Proche Orient (Syria, Jordan, Lebanon, Palestine, Irak) based in Damascus, Syria (2008-2012) and then Beyrouth, Lebanon (2012-2013). He is also a member of the European Council on Foreign Relations (ECFR). He’s been convicted in May 2026 for “glorifying terrorism”. https://sacc-ejc.org/incident/islamic-studies-scholar-francois-burgat-convicted-on-appeal-for-glorifying-terrorism/

== Publications in English ==
- The Islamic Movement in North Africa (U of Texas Press, 1997),
- Face to Face with Political Islam (IB Tauris, 2002),
- Islamism in the shadow of al-Qaeda, Paris, La Découverte 2005, (U. of Texas Press 2008),
- Understanding Political Islam (Manchester University Press, December 20, 2019).
