= Ventas (Madrid) =

Coordinates: 40°25′42″N 3°39′27″W

- City neighborhood
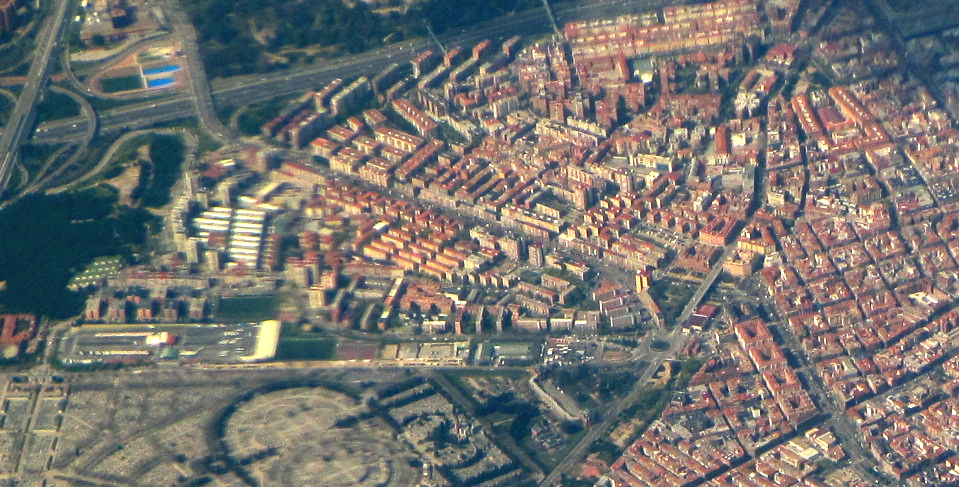

- Country: Spain
- Region: Community of Madrid
- Municipality: Madrid
- District: Ciudad Lineal

Area
  - Total: 3.198045 km^{2} (1.234772 sq mi)

Population (2020)
  - Total: 49,198
  - Density: 15,384/km^{2} (39,844/sq mi)

Ventas is an administrative neighborhood (barrio) of Madrid located within the district of Ciudad Lineal.

It covers an area of 3.198045 km^{2} (1.234772 sq mi). As of 1 March 2020, it has a population of 49,198.

The Almudena Cemetery, the largest in Madrid and considered one of the largest in Western Europe, is located in the neighborhood.

== Green spaces ==
The Pinar de La Elipa is a wooded park located west of the Almudena Cemetery, within the Ventas neighbourhood. It is identified by the Madrid City Council as one of the significant green spaces in the Ciudad Lineal district, alongside El Calero Park, which is situated between the neighbouring areas of Concepción and Quintana.
