= Ciudad Lineal =

Coordinates: 40°27′N 3°39′W

- District
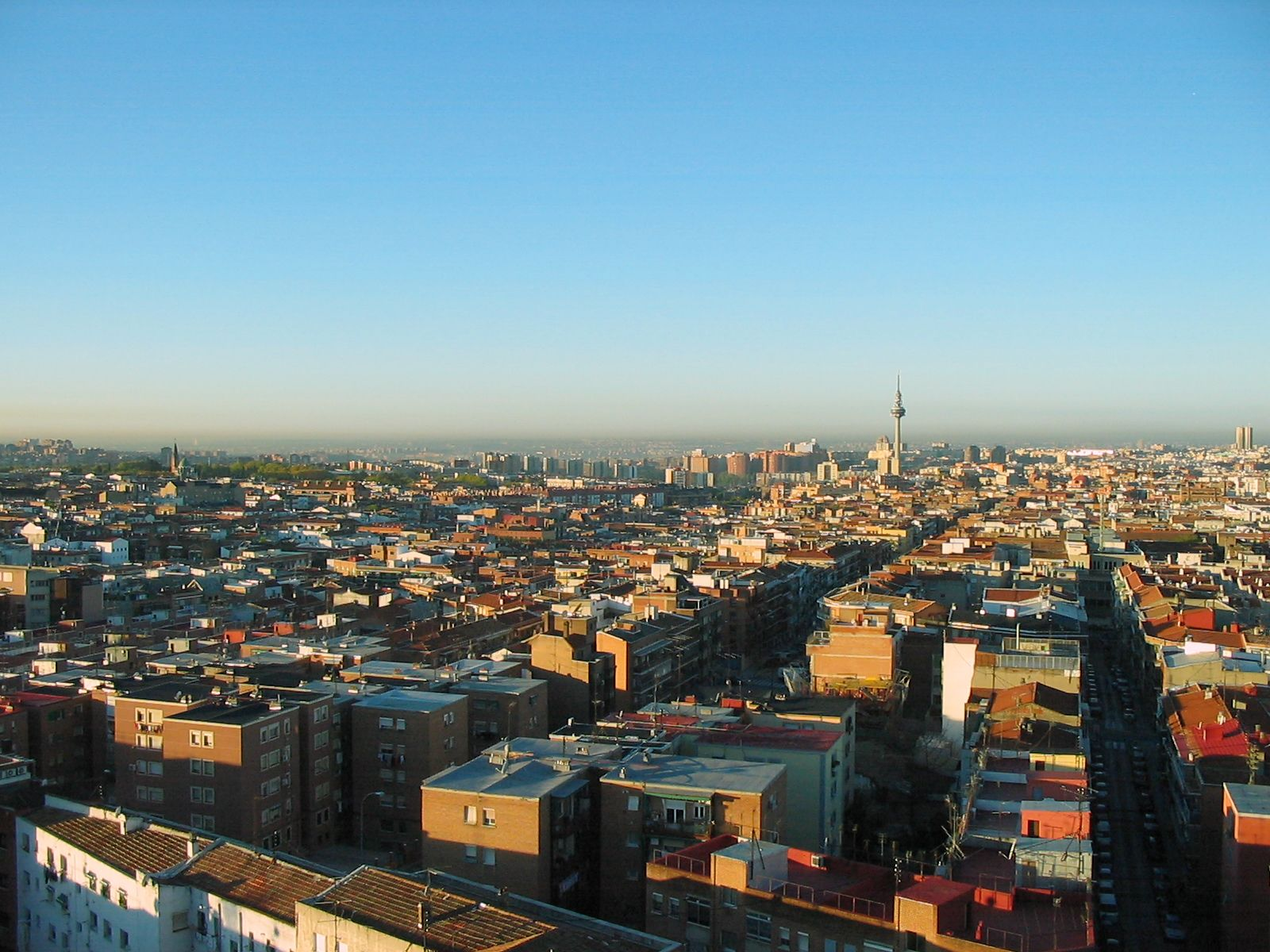
- Interactive map of Ciudad Lineal
- Country: Spain
- Community: Community of Madrid
- Municipality: Madrid
- Wards: List of wards (9): Ventas (151); Pueblo Nuevo (152); Quintana (153); Concepción (154); San Pascual (155); San Juan Bautista (156); Colina (157); Atalaya (158); Costillares (159)

Government
  - Councillor-President: Nadia Álvarez Padilla (PP, 2023)

Area
  - Total: 11.43 km^{2} (4.41 sq mi)

Population
  - Total: 228,171
  - Density: 19,970/km^{2} (51,700/sq mi)
- Postal code(s): 28017, 28027, 28032, 28033, 28043

Ciudad Lineal ([θjuˈðað lineˈal], "Linear City") is one of 21 districts of Madrid, Spain.

== Geography ==
=== Wards ===
The district is administratively divided into nine wards:

- Atalaya
- Colina
- Concepción
- Costillares
- Pueblo Nuevo
- Quintana
- San Juan Bautista
- San Pascual
- Ventas

== History ==
Its name, Linear City, comes from the model of organization of the same name devised by the Spanish architect Arturo Soria y Mata. The ‘Ciudad Lineal’ takes a form of a city 400 meters wide, centered on a tramway (line 70 - closed in 1972) and a thoroughfare running in parallel. The main street in the district, calle de Arturo Soria, bears his name. The city is the current headquarters for the flag carrier airline of Spain, Iberia. Mariano Belmás Estrada was one of the main architects in the early days.
