= Las Tablas (Madrid Metro) =

Madrid Metro station

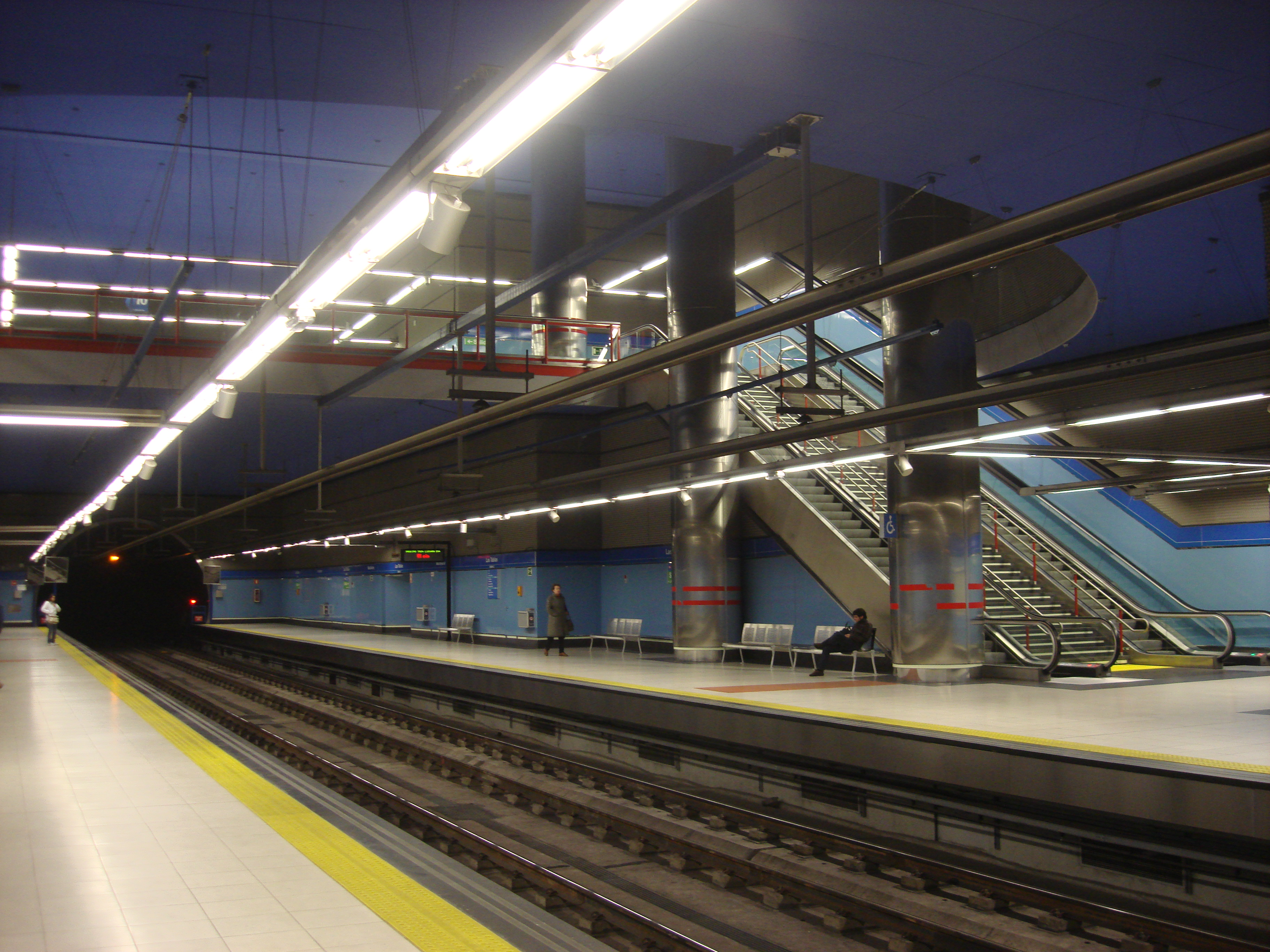

General information
- Location: Fuencarral-El Pardo, Madrid; Spain
- Coordinates: 40.5083299°N 3.669439°W
- System: Madrid Metro station
- Owner: CRTM
- Operator: CRTM

Construction
- Accessible: yes

Other information
- Fare zone: A

History
- Opened: 26 April 2007; 19 years ago

Services
| Preceding station | Madrid Metro | Following station |
|---|---|---|
| Ronda de la Comunicación towards Hospital Infanta Sofía | Line 10 | Montecarmelo towards Puerta del Sur |
| Palas de Rey towards Pinar de Chamartín | Line ML-1 | Terminus |
Location
- Location within Madrid

Las Tablas [las ˈtaβlas] is a station on Line 10 of the Madrid Metro and Line 1 of the Metro Ligero, serving the Las Tablas barrio. It is located in fare Zone A.
