= Argüelles (Madrid Metro) =

Madrid Metro station

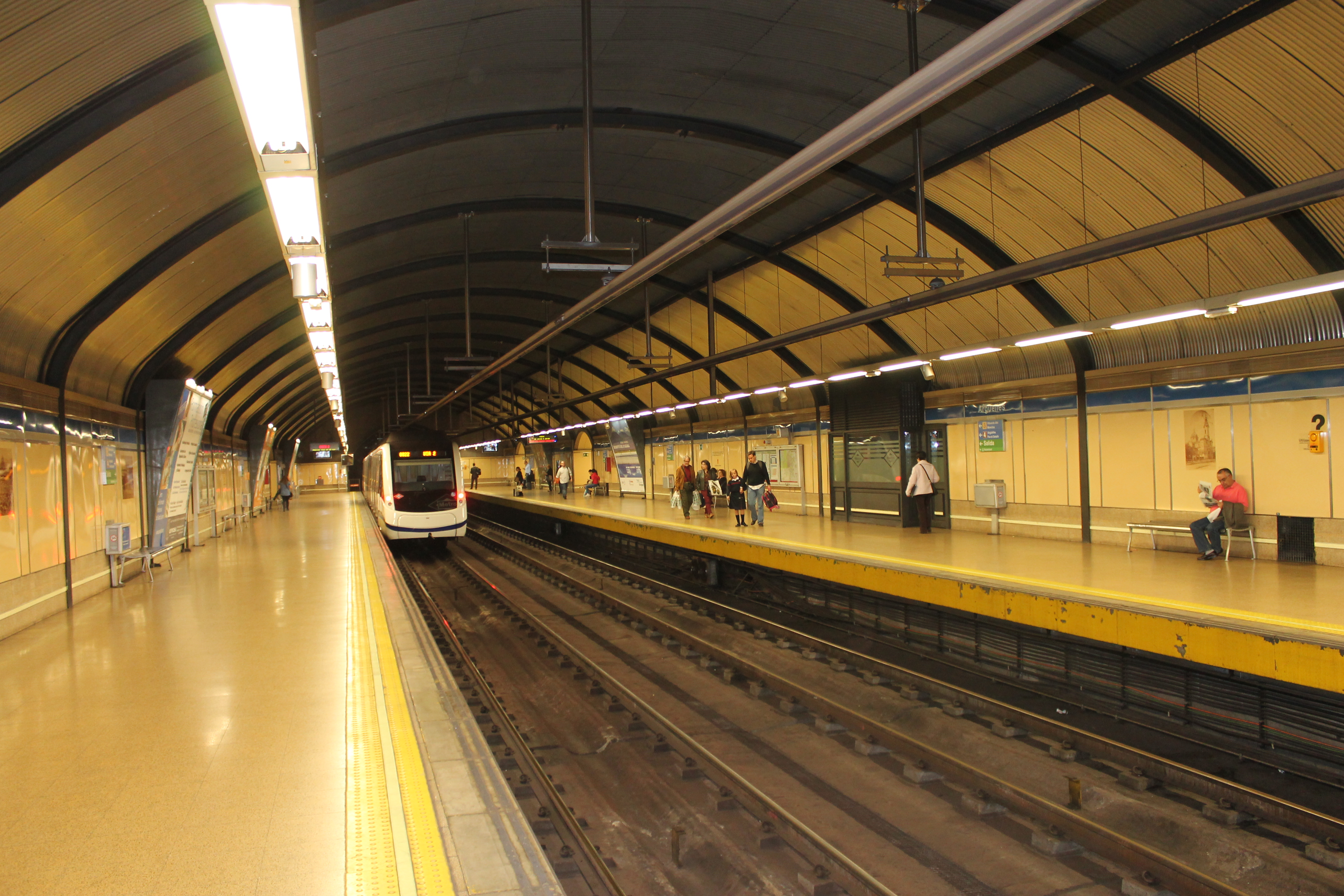
- Line 6 platforms

General information
- Location: Centro / Chamberí / Moncloa-Aravaca, Madrid; Spain
- Coordinates: 40.4306636°N 3.7159686°W
- System: Madrid Metro station
- Owner: CRTM
- Operator: CRTM

Construction
- Structure type: Underground
- Accessible: Yes

Other information
- Fare zone: A

History
- Opened: 15 July 1941; 85 years ago

Services
Preceding station	Madrid Metro	Following station
Ventura Rodríguez towards El Casar	Line 3	Moncloa Terminus
Terminus	Line 4	San Bernardo towards Pinar de Chamartín
Moncloa clockwise / outer	Line 6	Príncipe Pío anticlockwise / inner
Location
- Location within Madrid

Argüelles [aɾˈɣweʝes] is a station on Line 3, Line 4, and Line 6 of the Madrid Metro in Madrid, Spain. It is located underneath the intersection of Princesa and Marqués de Urquijo streets, between the districts of Moncloa-Aravaca and Chamberí, in fare Zone A. The station is named after the neighborhood of Argüelles, which is in turn named after the 19th century Spanish politician Agustín Argüelles.

== History ==
The station was inaugurated on 15 July 1941 when Line 3 was extended from Sol to Argüelles. The platforms were built underneath Princesa street between the intersections with Marqués de Urquijo/Alberto Aguilera and Altamirano streets. The Line 4 platforms were inaugurated on 23 March 1944 when Line 4 first opened. The platforms were built under Alberto Aguilera street between the intersections with Gaztambide and Andrés Mellado streets. Argüelles is a terminus station, and the platforms were built at the same level as the Line 3 platforms, which prevents the line from being extended westward.

The Line 6 platforms were inaugurated on 10 May 1995 when the segment between Laguna and Ciudad Universitaria was opened, converting Line 6 into a circular route. They are deeper than the other platforms, and are located between Marqués de Urquijo and Buen Suceso streets. The station was part of the extensive renovations of Line 3 during the summers of 2004, 2005, and 2006, during which the platforms were expanded from 60 m (200 ft) to 90 m (300 ft) and improvements were made for accessibility.
