= Hortaleza =

Coordinates: 40.469457°N 3.640482°W

- District
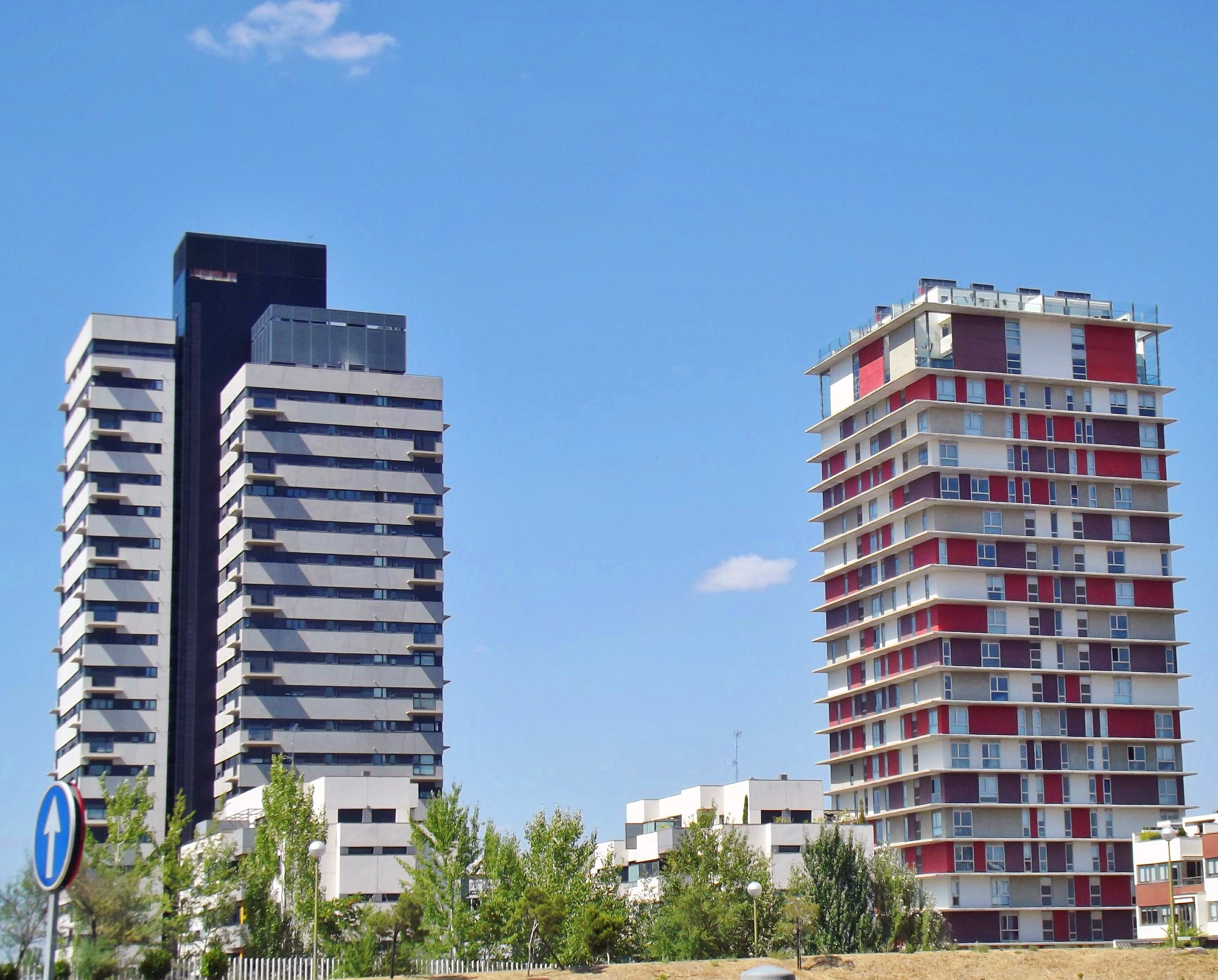
- Interactive map of Hortaleza
- Country: Spain
- Aut. community: Madrid
- Municipality: Madrid

Government
  - Councillor-President: David Pérez (PP, 2023)

Area
  - Total: 27.4 km^{2} (10.6 sq mi)

Population
  - Total: 161,661
  - Density: 5,896.9/km^{2} (15,273/sq mi)
- Postal codes: 28033, 28042, 28043, 28050
- Madrid district number: 16

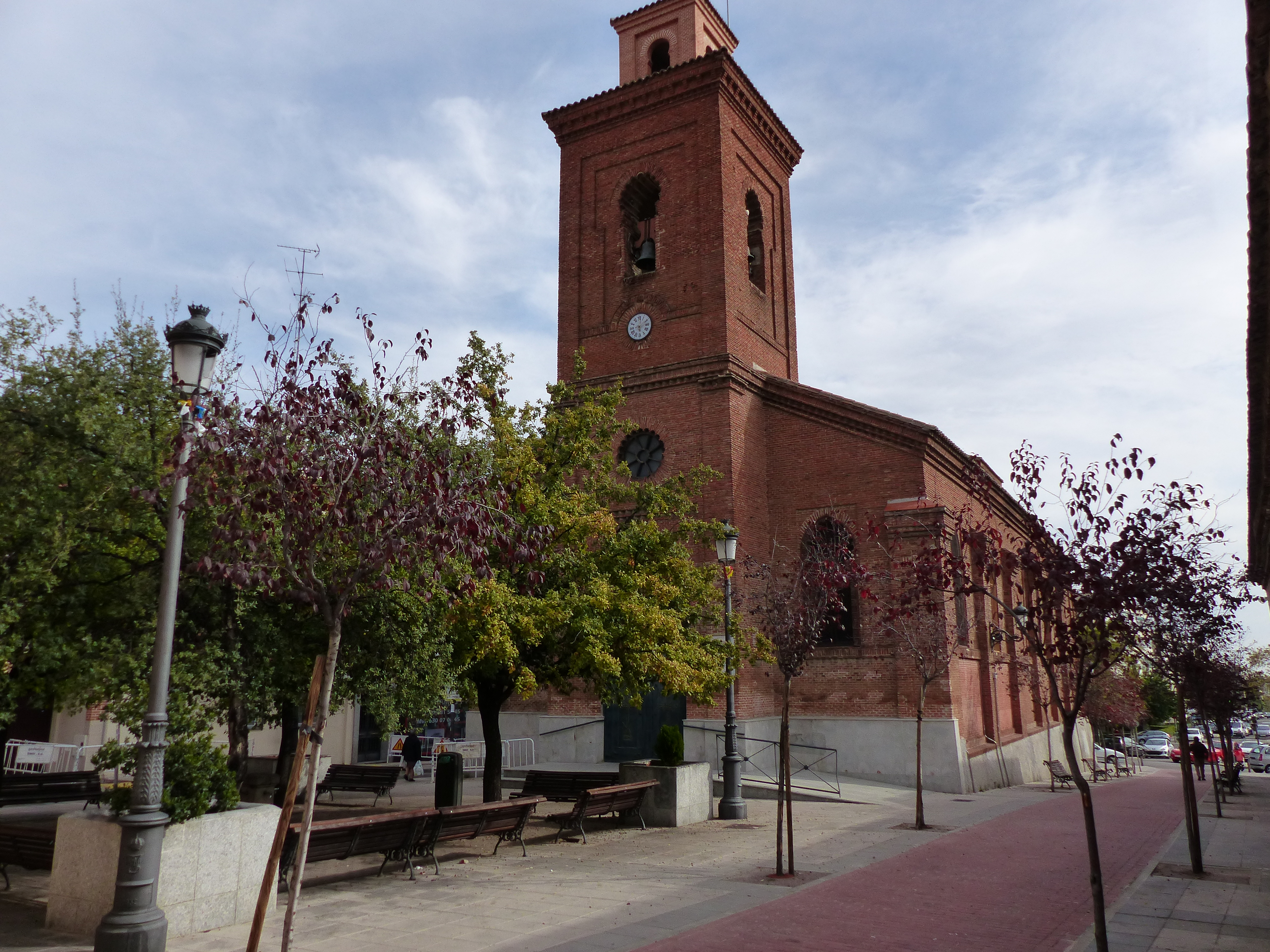
San Matías church 2015

Hortaleza is one of the 21 districts of the city of Madrid, Spain.

== History ==
=== Origin ===
The first recorded human activity in the area of Hortaleza was the existence of a nomadic or semi-nomadic population in the Paleolithic and Neolithic eras, as attested to by the findings of numerous prehistoric tools in sites in the Valdebebas stream and in the historical center of Hortaleza itself, which were discovered at the end of the 19th century by the archaeologist Dr. Javier Pastor Muñoz.

The current neighborhood of Hortaleza developed from the old town of Hortaleza, located on the hill formed between the Manzanares and Jarama rivers. The village was supplied with water by two streams, the Valdebebas and the Abroñigal. The town was most probably founded in the 13th century, with written attestation of it by 1361. It is believed that the town was founded by Mozarabs from Madrid who used it to spend the summer.

== Demographics ==
As of 2005 there were 153,939 residents, 17% of the population were minors, and Hortaleza was one of five Madrid districts with the youngest populations. In 2005, persons from France made up 1,424 of the residents, as a French community formed around the Lycée Français de Madrid main campus.

In Hortaleza, the French are the third largest foreign group after the Ecuadorians and Colombians, and there are more French speakers in Hortaleza than those of Moroccan Arabic, Peruvian Spanish, and Romanian. There is a French bookshop, Frañol, and a French nursery, Pomme D'Api.

=== Famous inhabitants ===
- Luis Aragonés - there is a monument in Cantabrian Sea Street, at the site of Aragonés' childhood home
- Florentino Pérez

== Geography ==
=== Subdivision ===
The district is administratively divided into six wards (Barrios):

- Apóstol Santiago
- Canillas
- Palomas
- Pinar del Rey
- Piovera
- Valdefuentes

Foreigners make up 17.31% of the residents of La Piovera, while 6.16% of the residents of Apóstol Santiago were foreigners. Neighborhoods other than La Piovera have smaller foreigner populations.

Sanchinarro, an independent community before 1950, is a part of Hortaleza. 13,500 houses were scheduled to be in Sanchinarro in a period around 2005. 11,500 apartment units were planned for Ciudad Aeroportuaria-Valdebebas, another development in Hortaleza.

== Education ==
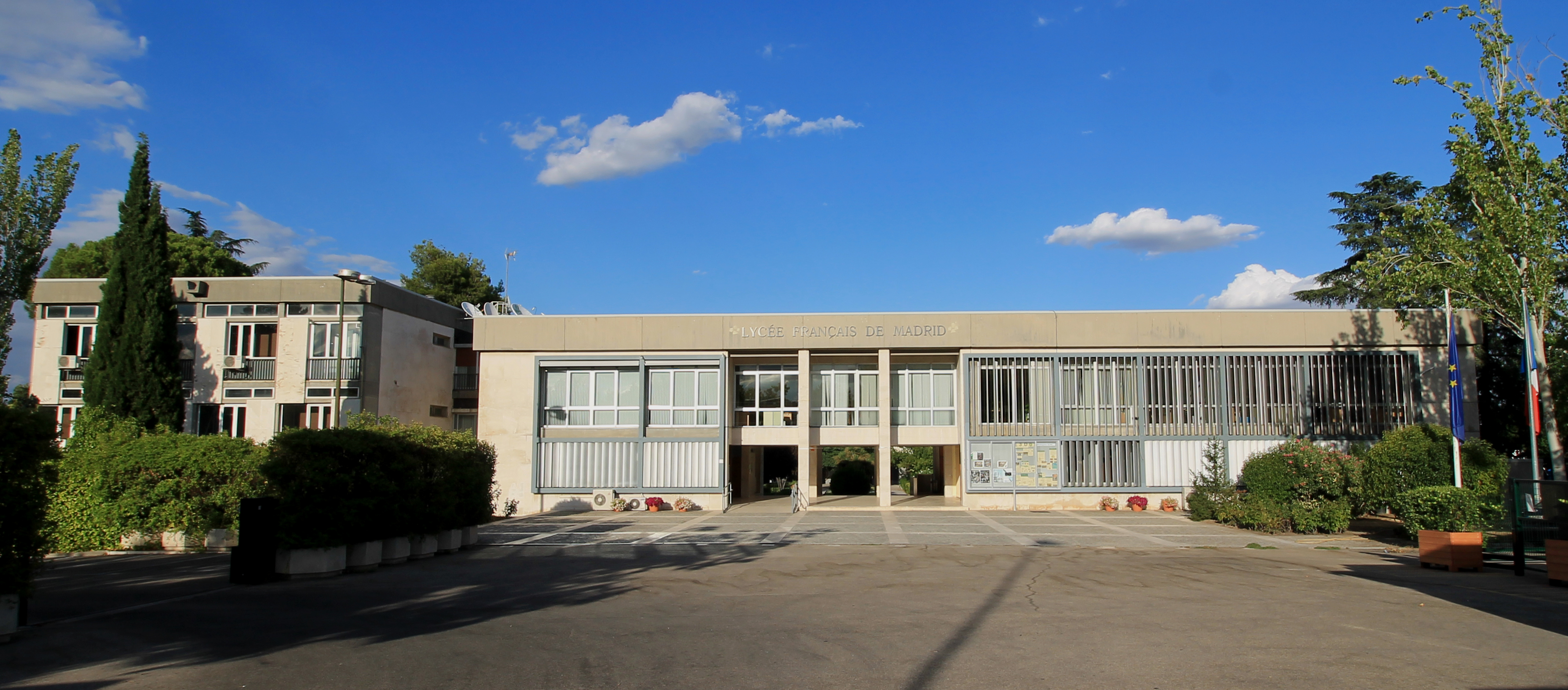
Lycée Français de Madrid Conde de Orgaz campus

- Lycée Français de Madrid Main campus

== Politics ==
As of 2005 the most voted-for political party in Hortaleza was the People's Party (PP).
