= Calle de Bravo Murillo =

Street in Madrid, Spain

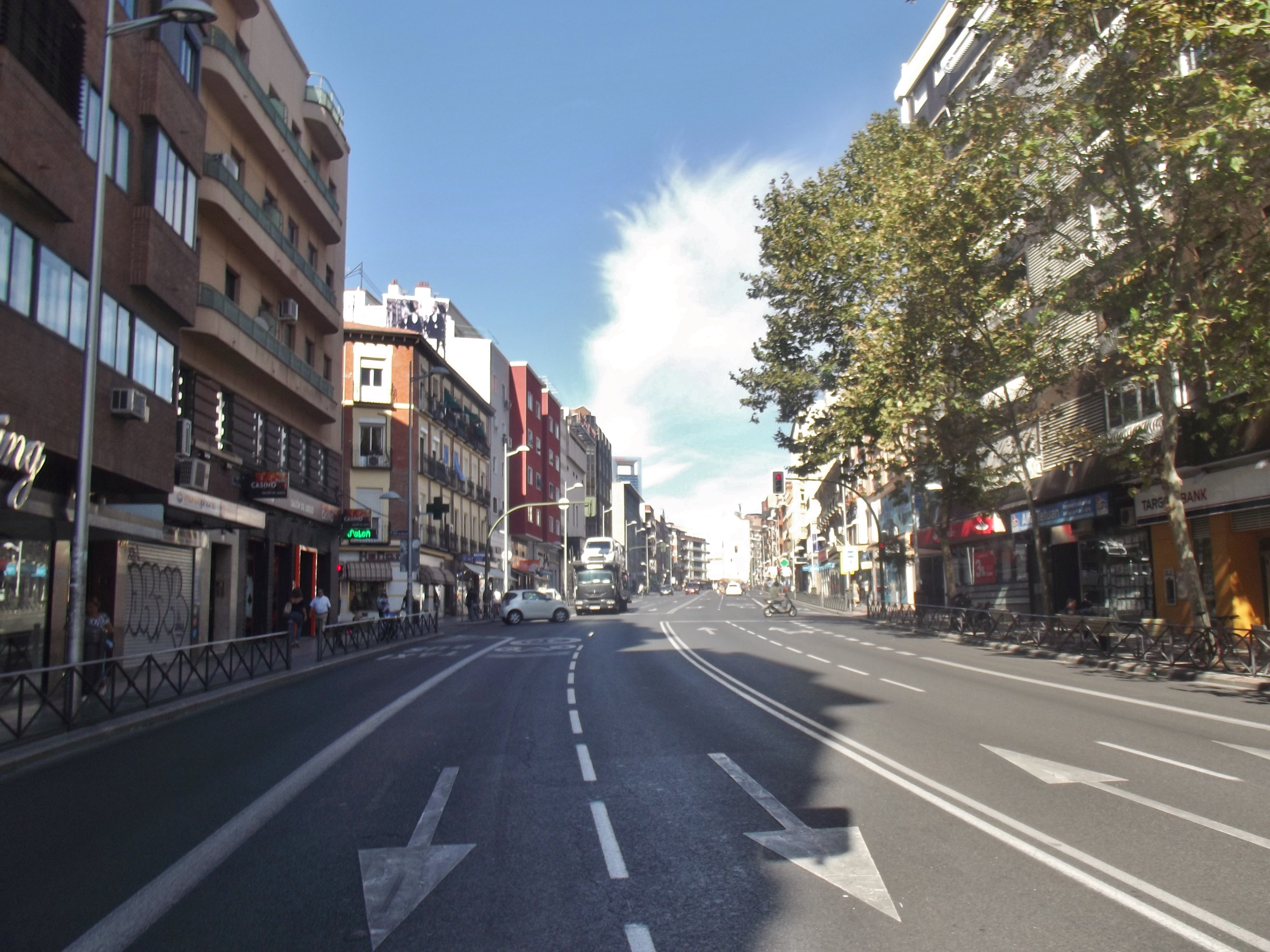
- Namesake: Juan Bravo Murillo
- Type: street
- Length: 4 km (2.5 mi)
- Location: Madrid, Spain
- South end: Glorieta de Quevedo
- North end: Plaza de Castilla

The calle de Bravo Murillo is a major street in Madrid, Spain.

The streets starts in the glorieta de Quevedo, in the Chamberí District. Going North across the Tetuán District, it features a slightly bended path joining with the Paseo de la Castellana at the Plaza de Castilla.

The street urbanised as slums were built along what it formerly was the Carretera de Francia ("Road of France"). In the context of the early 20th-century, the impoverished area became the epicentre of the "rebel and combative" Madrid despite its peripheral status and, during the 1917 general strike, seditious pamphlets were handed over in the street. In the 2010s, a huge number of betting shops controversially proliferated in the street, leading up to protests against gambling.

The street name (dating back to 1875) remembers Juan Bravo Murillo, a 19th-century politician who promoted the Canal de Isabel II, and the meeting of the street with José Abascal currently hosts a monument dedicated to him. Before the annexation by Madrid of the municipality of Chamartín de la Rosa in 1948, the stretch of the street passing through the latter municipality was called O'Donnell.

Stretching along a total length of roughly 4 kilometres, it passes through the neighborhoods of Arapiles, Trafalgar, Vallehermoso and Ríos Rosas in the Chamberí District. Passing also the Tetuán District up North, the streets constitutes the border between the western neighborhoods of Bellas Vistas, Berruguete, Valdeacederas and Almenara and the eastern neighborhoods of Cuatro Caminos and Castillejos. One of the chief commercial axis of the city, the 2.81 km stretch passing through Tetuán constitutes the spine of the district.

Some standout buildings located in the street include the Iglesia de Nuestra Señora de los Ángeles (E. M. Repullés), building in a French-influenced gothic style; the Europa Cinema, or the Mercado de Maravillas.
