= Plaza de Castilla =

Square in Madrid

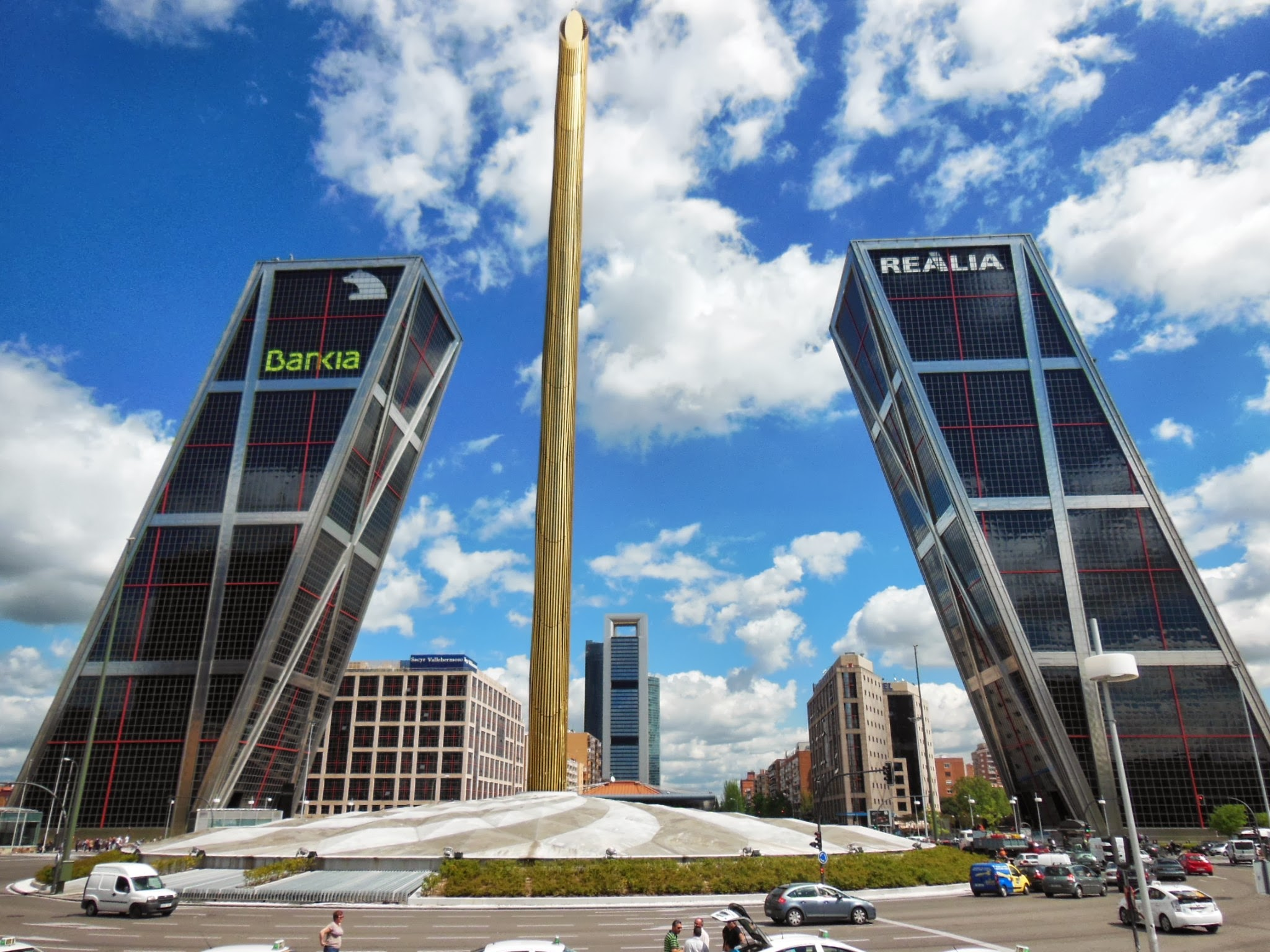
- View of the roundabout in 2013
- Interactive map of Plaza de Castilla
- Type: roundabout
- Maintained by: Ayuntamiento of Madrid
- Location: Tetuán & Chamartín (Madrid, Spain)
- Coordinates: 40.46583333°N 3.68916667°W
- Major junctions: Paseo de la Castellana, Calle de Bravo Murillo, Avenida de Asturias, Calle de Agustín de Foxá, Calle de Mateo Inurria

The Plaza de Castilla ([ˈplaθa ðe kasˈtiʝa], English: "Castile Square") is a square in the north of Madrid, Spain.

== Location ==
It is located in the north of the city and is bisected by Paseo de la Castellana, one of the main thoroughfares of the capital, almost at its end. It lies between the districts of Chamartín and Tetuán. It is the quadripoint intersecting the neighborhoods of Castilla, Nueva España, Almenara and Castillejos. The Avenida de Asturias and the streets of Agustín de Foxá, Mateo Inurria and Bravo Murillo also converge in this place .

A major transport node of the city, the Plaza de Castilla is located on the grounds of what was formerly called "El Hotel del Negro".

The Puerta de Europa Towers are situated at the north end of the Plaza. Erected directly in the center of the roundabout, the maligned Caja Madrid Obelisk (best known as the Calatrava's Obelisk) was inaugurated in 2009. A monument to José Calvo Sotelo lies on the southern end of the Plaza de Castilla.
