= Florentino Azpeitia Moros =

Spanish scientist

- Born: 13 March 1859; Ateca, Spain
- Died: 2 January 1934{ Madrid (Spain)
- Education: School of Mining Engineering of Madrid
- Known for: Study of mollusc shells and diatoms
- Scientific career
- Fields: Mining engineer Paleontologist; Malacologist
- Workplaces: School of Mining Engineering of Madrid; Geological and Mining Institute of Spain

Florentino Azpeitia Moros (Ateca, March 13, 1859–Madrid, January 2, 1934) was a Spanish mining engineer, paleontologist, malacologist and diatomologist.

== Biography ==
Florentino Azpeitia was born on March 13, 1859, in Ateca (Zaragoza, Spain), into a well-to-do family. He completed his primary education in his hometown and pursued his secondary studies in Zaragoza. He initially began a degree in Science at the local university; however, when these programs were discontinued in Zaragoza in 1874, he moved to Madrid in 1875 to study Mining Engineering at the School of Mining Engineers. There, he first undertook preparatory coursework and subsequently completed the full degree program between 1879 and 1883. Among his professors was Lucas Mallada, who fostered his interest in paleontology.

Upon completing his studies, he fulfilled the mandatory practical training required for graduation at the El Lagunazo copper pyrite mine in Alosno (Huelva), where he remained until July 1886. That same year, he secured a position in the laboratory of the School of Mining Engineers in Madrid. In 1891, he joined the Geological Map Commission of Spain, serving as a member until 1897.

In 1896, he was appointed professor of geology and paleontology at the School of Mining Engineers in Madrid. From 1907 until 1921, he was solely responsible for teaching paleontology. From a research perspective, although his first publication deals with paleontology, he devoted himself primarily to the study of molluscs and diatoms. In total, he described 56 new species across various groups of organisms. His malacological collection, assembled with the support of Joaquín Rodríguez Hidalgo—whom he had met in 1883—eventually exceeded 80,000 specimens representing 8,171 species.

In 1897, he was admitted as a member of the Spanish Society of Natural History, and in 1902 he also joined the Aragonese Society of Natural Sciences, of which he was appointed president in 1913. In March 1923, he was granted retirement from the Mining Council, which he had requested due to health problems. Despite this, he continued his research activities. In 1933, he served as a board member of the Spanish Society of Natural History; however, the prostate cancer from which he had suffered for several years ultimately curtailed his work, and he died on January 2 of 1934.

Following his death, his family donated this collection to the National Museum of Natural Sciences. His diatom collection, comprising over 5,000 microscopic preparations, became part of the holdings of the Geological and Mining Institute of Spain. His work on Spanish bivalve mollusks was published posthumously. He also left several unfinished manuscripts, which were later completed and edited by researchers at the National Museum of Natural Sciences.

== Main publications ==
- Azpeitia, Florentino (1911). La diatomología española en los comienzos del siglo XX. Asociación Española para el Progreso de las Ciencia, Congreso de Zaragoza, vol. IV. p 320.
- Azpeitia, Florentino (1929). Monografía de las melanopsis vivientes y fósiles de España. Memorias del Instituto Geológico y Minero de España, 36, p 402.
- Azpeitia, Florentino (1933). Conchas bivalvas de agua dulce de España y Portugal. Memorias del Instituto Geológico y Minero de España, 38-39 (1933), p 763.
