= Cuatro Caminos (Madrid) =

Coordinates: 40°27′01″N 3°41′45″W

- City neighborhood
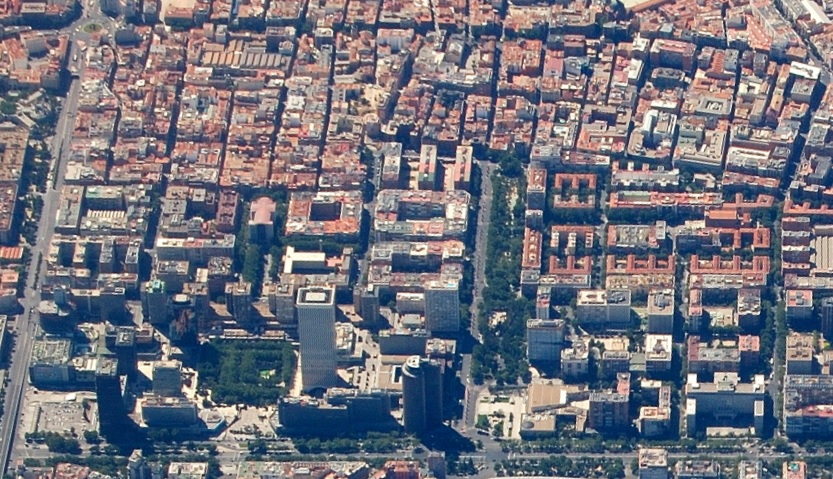
- Interactive map of Cuatro Caminos
- Country: Spain
- Region: Community of Madrid
- Municipality: Madrid
- District: Tetuán

Area
  - Total: 1.193509 km^{2} (0.460816 sq mi)

Population (2020)
  - Total: 35,395
  - Density: 29,656/km^{2} (76,809/sq mi)

Cuatro Caminos is an administrative neighborhood (barrio) of Madrid belonging to the district of Tetuán. It has an area of 1.193509 km^{2} (0.460816 sq mi). As of 1 February 2020, it has a population of 35,395. It was created as slum of the north of the city, on the east side of the Road of France, currently the calle de Bravo Murillo.

The ward's boundaries are marked by the Calle de Raimundo Fernández Villaverde to the south, the Calle de San Germán (formerly General Yagüe) to the north (separating it from Castillejos); the Glorieta de Cuatro Caminos in the southeast corner, the Calle de Bravo Murillo to the west and the Paseo de la Castellana to the East.

Many of the streets located in the neighborhood are named after Spanish provinces, including Guipúzcoa, Cuenca, Oviedo, Palencia, Jaén, Teruel, Ávila, Salamanca, and La Coruña.

One of the financial districts of Madrid, AZCA, spreads across the southeast of the neighborhood.

== See also ==
- Plaza de Pablo Ruiz Picasso
- Monument to General Perón (Madrid)
