= Avenida de Asturias =

Street in Tetuán, Madrid, Spain

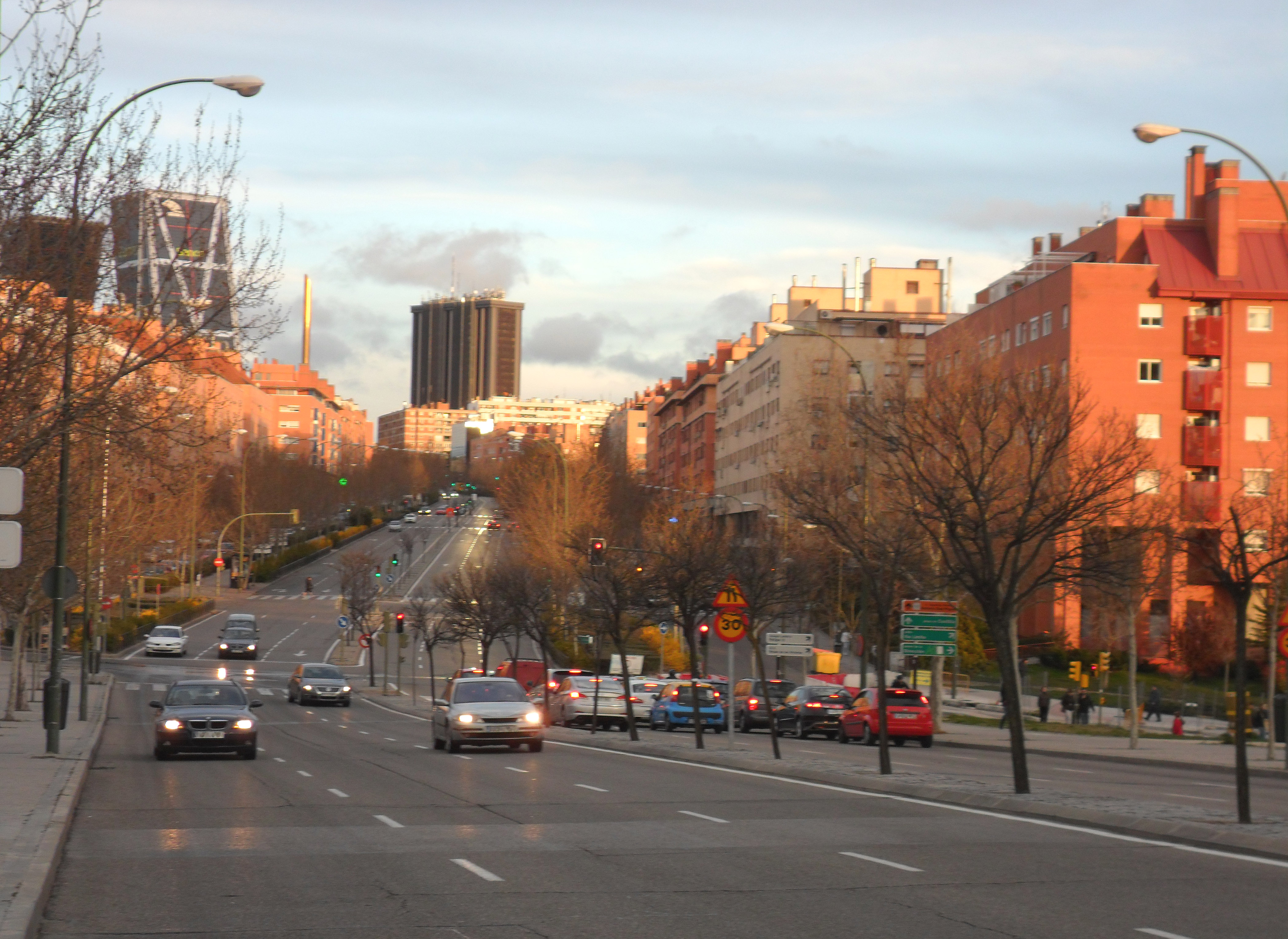
- Interactive map of Avenida de Asturias
- Width: 58 m (190 ft)
- Location: Madrid, Spain
- East end: Plaza de Castilla
- West end: Calle de Sinesio Delgado

The Avenida de Asturias ("Avenue of Asturias") is a street in northwest Madrid, located in the district of Tetuán. A relatively recent urban development, opened in 2000, it hosts a multitudinous Sunday flea market since 2005.

== History and description ==
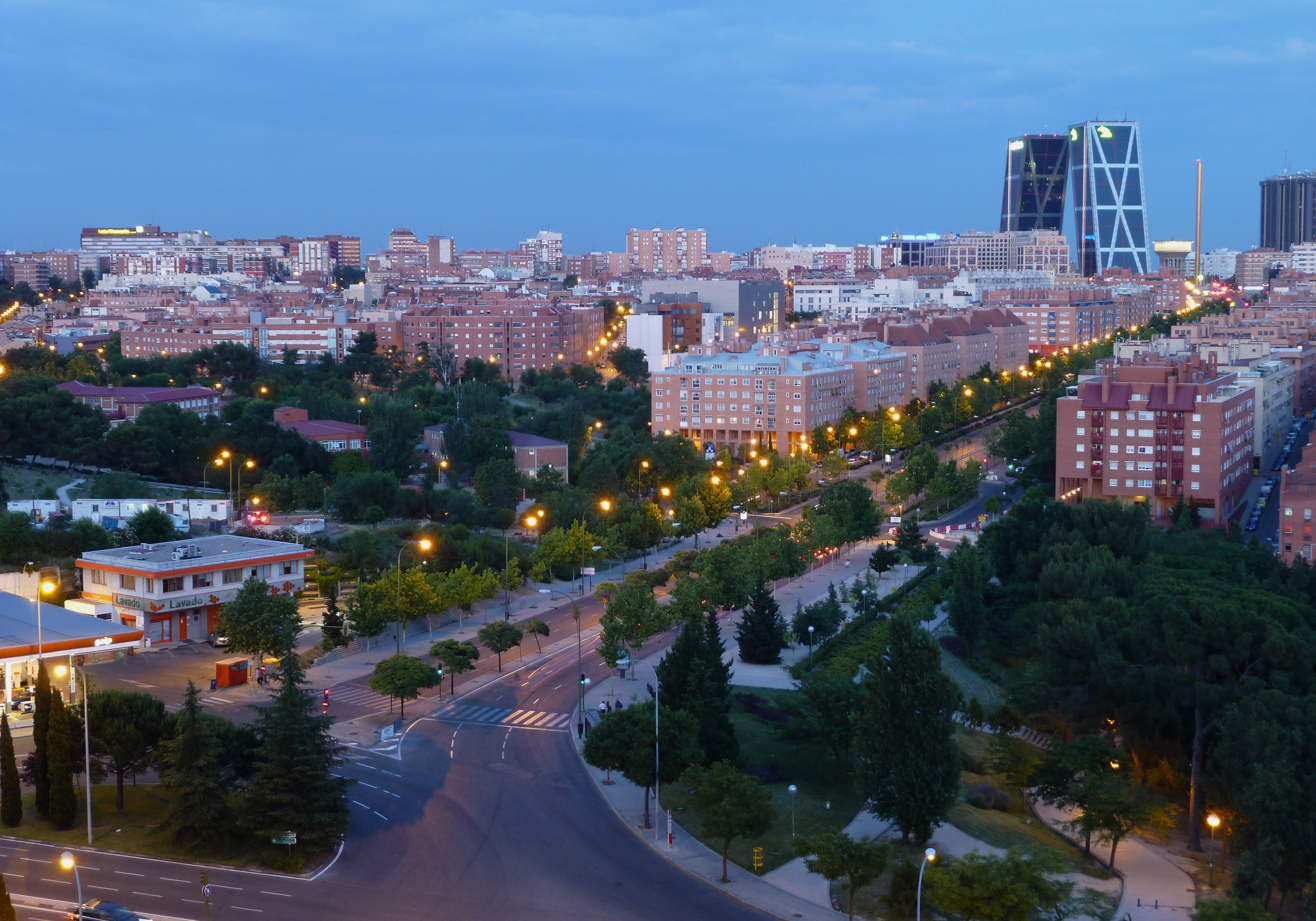
Twilight view from El Pilar neighborhood featuring the Puerta de Europa towers at the background

It straddles along a E–W thalweg separating La Ventilla and Valdeacederas; with a difference in level between the maximum level at plaza de Castilla and the minimum level at the Paseo de la Dirección of about 32 metres (105 ft). The avenue, that starts in the plaza de Castilla and ends at its junction with the calle de Sinesio Delgado, also links with the Paseo de la Dirección and the calle de Ginzo de Limia as major junctions.

Its construction was part of the wider project for the reform of La Ventilla area, constituting the key axis of the latter. The plot over which the street was built (along the very path of the former "calle de los Curtidos"), was an area featuring high levels of urban decay.

The reform of the area was passed through the modification of the 1985 Plan General de Ordenación Urbana (PGOU). Several buildings works were carried out by the Instituto de la Vivienda de Madrid (IVIMA), and the new street, with a total width of 58 metres (190 ft), was inaugurated in 2000. The new housing has been described as rather "impersonal".

The Sunday flea market (mercadillo) installed in the street in 2005 is one of the biggest flea markets in the city.
