= Valdeacederas (Madrid Metro) =

Madrid Metro station

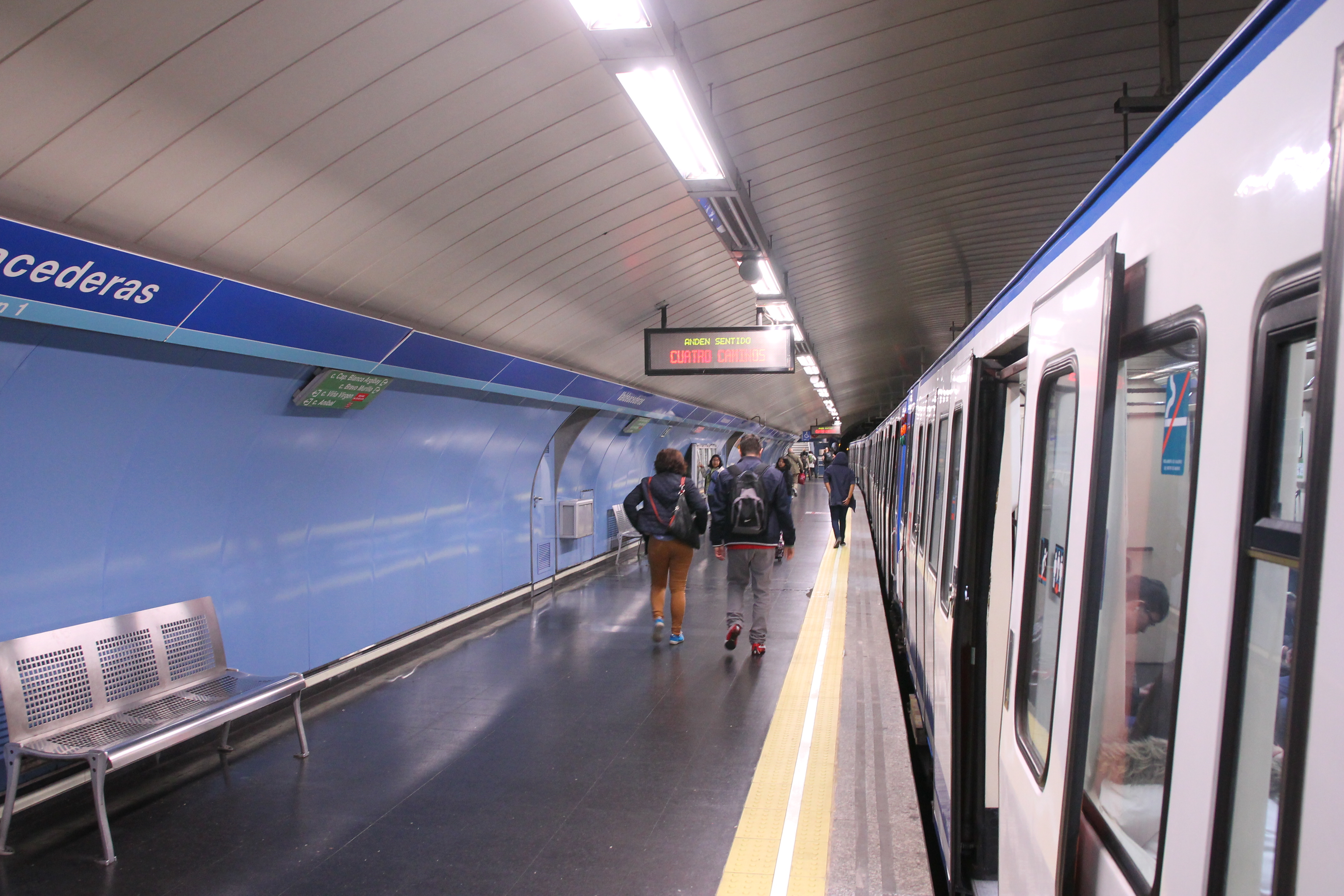
- Platform of the station

General information
- Location: Tetuán, Madrid; Spain
- Coordinates: 40.4644218°N 3.6950594°W
- System: Madrid Metro station
- Owner: CRTM
- Operator: CRTM

Construction
- Structure type: Underground
- Accessible: No

Other information
- Fare zone: A

History
- Opened: 4 February 1961; 65 years ago

Services
Preceding station	Madrid Metro	Following station
Plaza de Castilla towards Pinar de Chamartín	Line 1	Tetuán towards Valdecarros
Location
- Location within Madrid

Valdeacederas [baldeaθeˈðeɾas] is a station on Line 1 of the Madrid Metro, opened in 1961 and located in Valdeacederas. It is located in Zone A.
