= Lucas Mallada y Pueyo =

Spanish writer and engineer

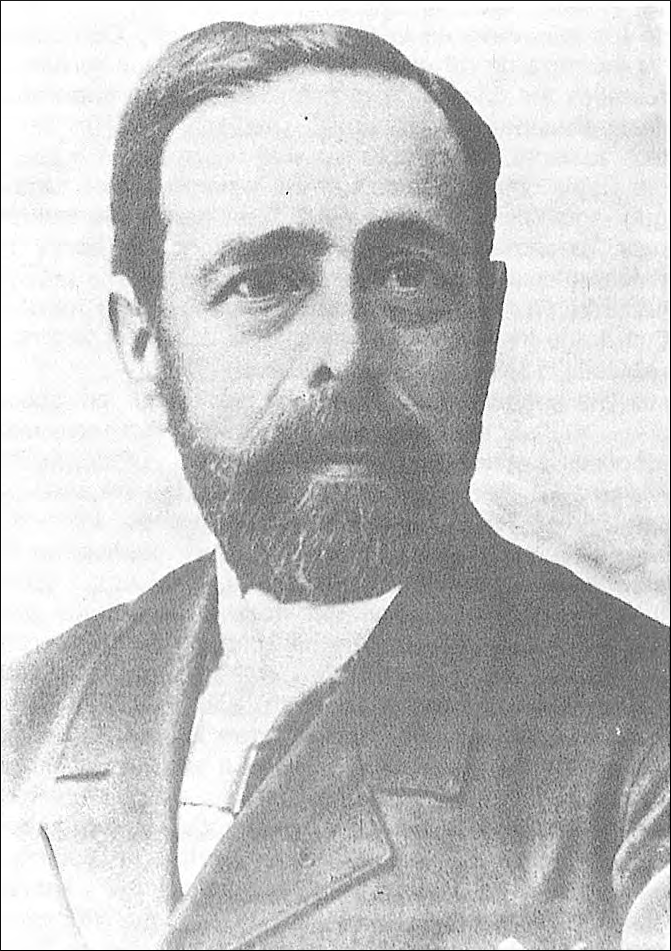
- Born: 18 October 1841; Huesca
- Died: 7 February 1921 (aged 79)
- Education: School of Mining Engineering of Madrid
- Known for: founder of Spanish scientific paleontology
- Notable work: Sinopsis de las especies fósiles que se han encontrado en España
- Scientific career
- Fields: geology paleontology
- Workplaces: Escuela de Capataces de Minas de Sama de Langreo; Geological and Mining Institute of Spain

Lucas Mallada y Pueyo was a Spanish geologist and mining engineer. He is considered the most important Spanish geologist of the second half of the 19th century and the founder of Spanish scientific paleontology.

== Biography ==
Lucas Mallada was born in Huesca on October 18, 1841. He moved with his family to Zaragoza in 1847, and from there to Madrid in 1859. From 1860 onwards, he studied mining engineering at the Escuela de Ingenieros de Minas de Madrid (School of Mining Engineering of Madrid), obtaining his degree in 1866. He began his professional activity as a Trainee Engineer in the Almadén mines. Between 1867 and 1869, he was a professor at the Escuela de Capataces de Minas de Sama de Langreo (School of Mine Foremen of Sama de Langreo).

In 1870, he joined the newly created Comisión del Mapa Geológico de España (currently the Geological and Mining Institute of Spain), an institution that aimed to create geological maps at a scale of 1:400,000 for each of the provinces of Spain. Along with each map, an extensive report would also be published, including not only the geological and mining description but also information about the climate and local crops. In 1878, he married Concepción Domingo y Roca, with whom he had two daughters, Pilar and María. Between 1879 and 1892, he also held the position of professor of paleontology at the School of Mining Engineers in Madrid. Ideologically, Lucas Mallada was part of the movement known as regenerationism, together with Joaquín Costa, also from Aragon, publishing various political writings. He retired in 1910 and died in Madrid on February 7, 1921.

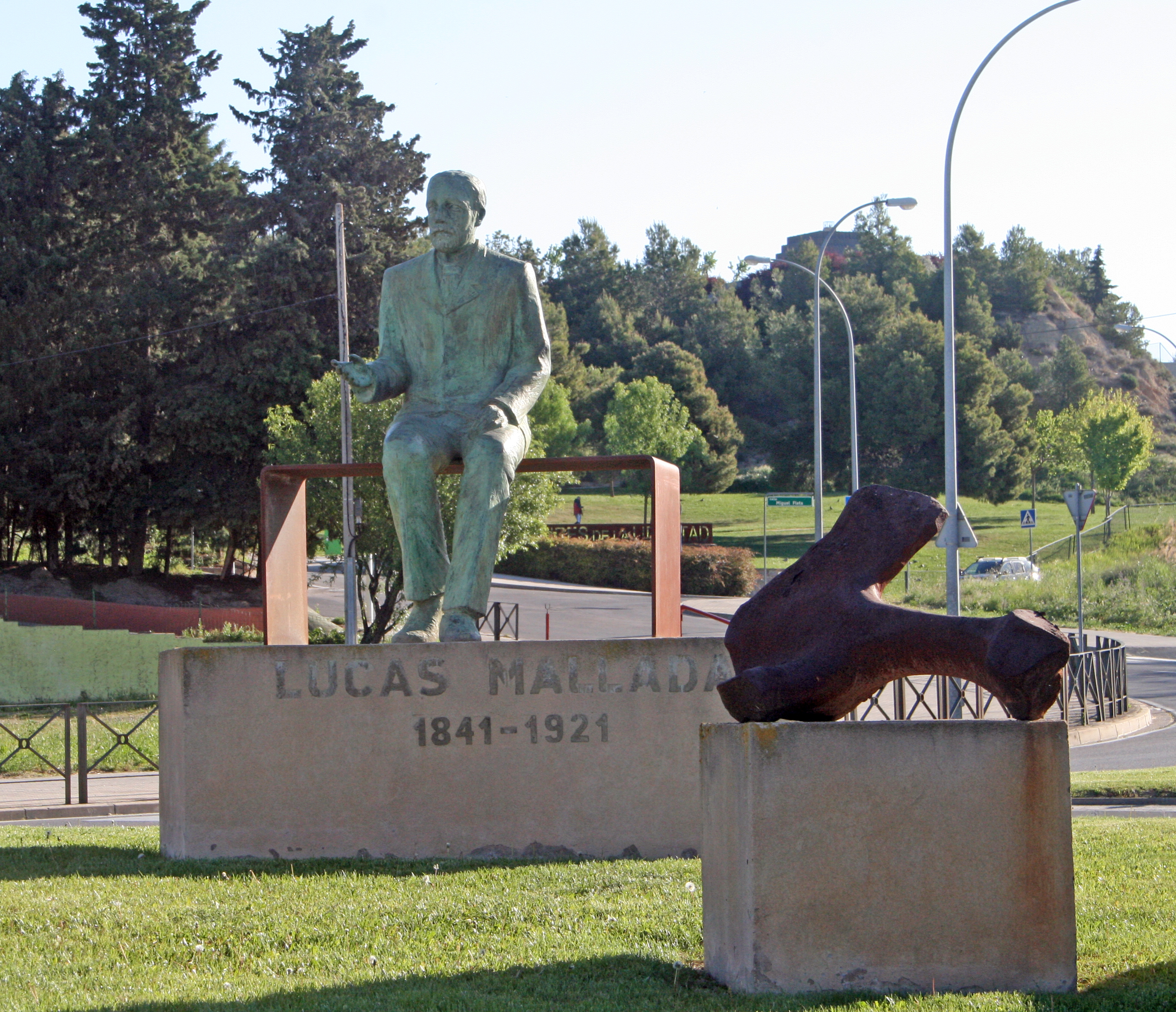
Monument to the geologist Lucas Mallada, installed in a roundabout in front of the university, in Huesca.

He received the Grand Crosses of Isabel la Católica and Alfonso XII. In Huesca, the city where he was born, there are two monuments in homage to Lucas Mallada: one from 1925, the work of Ramón Acín, in the city park, and another from 2006, the work of A.G. Ascaso, at the roundabout on the promenade that bears his name, in front of a building that is currently part of the university.

== Scientific work ==
After joining the Geological Map Commission of Spain, Lucas Mallada began the study of the province of Huesca in 1871, although the commission's economic problems caused his work to be interrupted until 1874. The working expedition carried out in 1875 was interrupted by the Carlist War, so he had to conduct another one in 1877, also with enormous economic difficulties. Finally, he was able to complete the work, which was published in 1878. He was also the author, together with Justo Egozcue, of the report on the province of Cáceres.

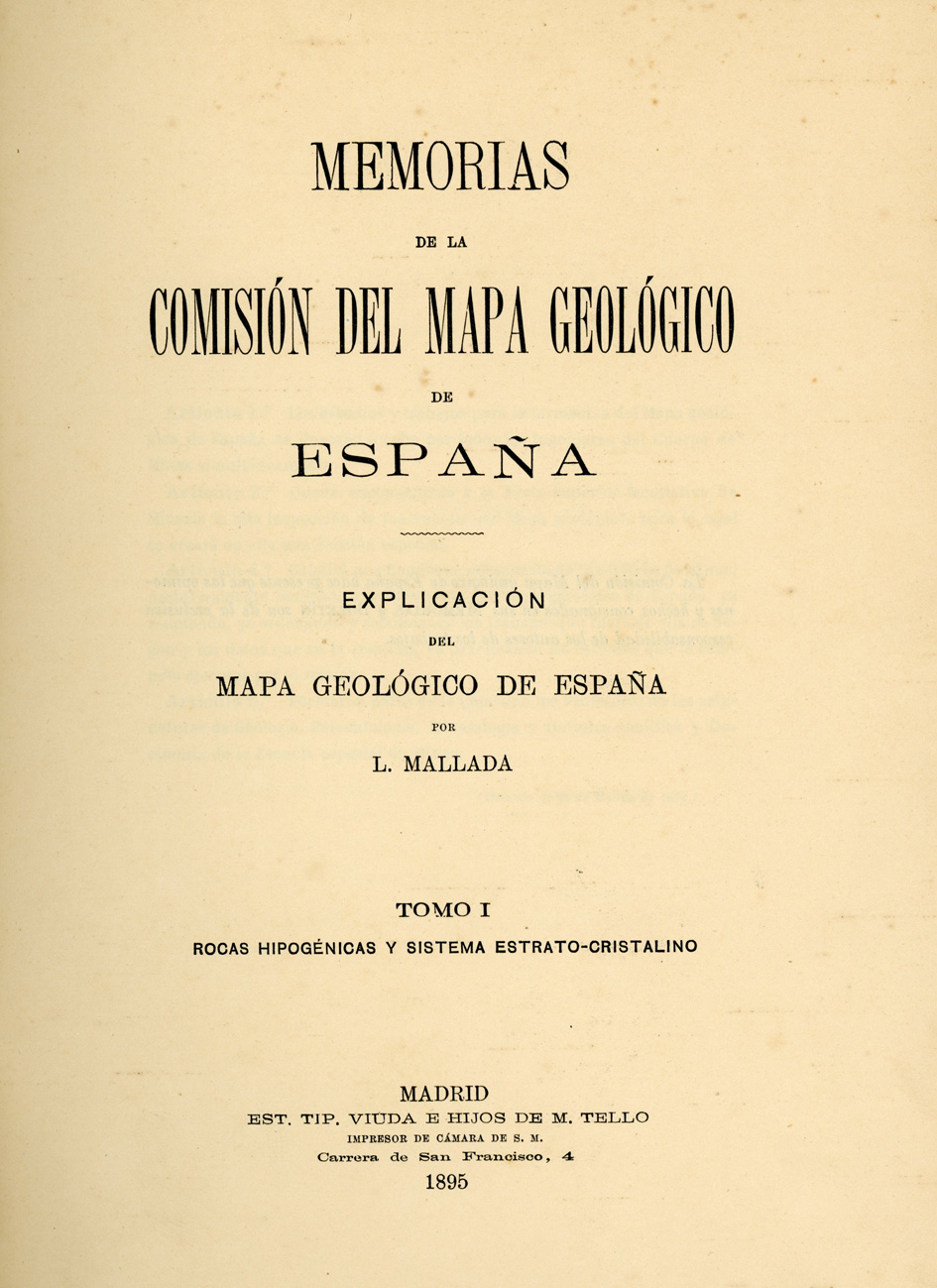
Cover of the first volume of the Explanation of the Geological Map of Spain

Between 1875 and 1892, he published the Sinopsis de las especies fósiles que se han encontrado en España (Synopsis of the Fossil Species that have been Found in Spain), in 17 issues of the Bulletin of the Geological Map Commission. Each description was accompanied by the corresponding illustration, so that the most characteristic fossils of the different terrains could be identified. Furthermore, the existing specimens in the collections of the Geological Map Commission were preferably used as models, without copying illustrations from other works. This series was completed in 1892 with the Catalogo general de las especies fósiles encontradas en España (General Catalog of Fossil Species Found in Spain), a work that includes 4,058 species.

His main work is the Explicación del mapa geológico de España ( Explanation of the Geological Map of Spain), published between 1895 and 1911 in seven volumes with a total of 3,740 pages. The Explanation corresponds in principle to the 1:400,000 scale geological map published in 1889 under the direction of M. Fernández de Castro, although it goes far beyond a simple explanation, including a large amount of complementary information, especially on mining. The volumes were published with uneven time intervals, probably due to budgetary reasons.

During his work in Huesca, between 1871 and 1878, Lucas Mallada formed an important collection of minerals, fossils, and rocks (528 specimens, of which 134 are preserved), which he deposited in the museum of the Comisión del Mapa Geológico (currently, Museum of the Geological and Mining Institute, in Madrid). He also contributed numerous specimens from other regions where he conducted research. In addition, he assembled a personal collection of minerals and fossils that, after his death, was donated by his family in 1925, along with his library and archive, to the Normal School of Teachers of Huesca. This collection is practically complete in the Faculty of Human Sciences and Education of Huesca, which is part of the University of Zaragoza.

Several fossil taxa have been dedicated to him: a subfamily and a genus of trilobites (Subfamily Malladaiinae, Genus Malladaia) and more than 20 species, including the cnidarian Enallohelia malladai, the cephalopods Vascoceras malladae and Pulchellia malladae, and the echinoid Hemidiadema malladai. The Spanish entomologist Longinos Navás dedicated a genus of neuroptera to him, Mallada (the type species is Mallada stigmatus), and one species, Wesmalesius malladai.
