= José García-Siñeriz =

Spanisch politician

José García-Siñeriz y Pardo-Moscoso (Madrid, Spain, May 11, 1886 - Madrid, January 28, 1974) was a Spanish mining engineer, geophysicist, and politician.

Upon ending his studies in Mining Engineering and visiting several foreign centers, he joined the Instituto Geográfico y Catastral (Geographic and Cadastral Institute) and became director of the Instituto Geológico y Minero de España (Geological and Mining Institute of Spain). He was awarded by the Spanish Royal Academy of Sciences, in which he was admitted as a member in 1935.

At CSIC (Spanish National Research Council) he became first vice-president and director the National Institute of Geophysics. He became president of the International Committee of Geophysics, member of the Pontifical Academy of Sciences and President of the Royal Spanish Society of Physics and Chemistry in 1942. He received the Alfonso X el Sabio prize.

As a politician, he was appointed Attorney in Courts (1943-1946).

J. García-Siñeriz is one of the greatest figures in the Mining Engineers Corps, having developed an intense professional work in the field of Geophysics, both theoretical and applied. He published abundantly in the fields of seismics and geophysics.

After his death, a foundation bearing his name was established and, following his will and starting in 1994, created the García-Siñeriz Geophysics Awards for Spanish, Portuguese and Latin-American geophysics.

== Links ==
- Fundación J. Garcia-Siñeriz
