= Plaza de Olavide =

Square in Madrid, Spain

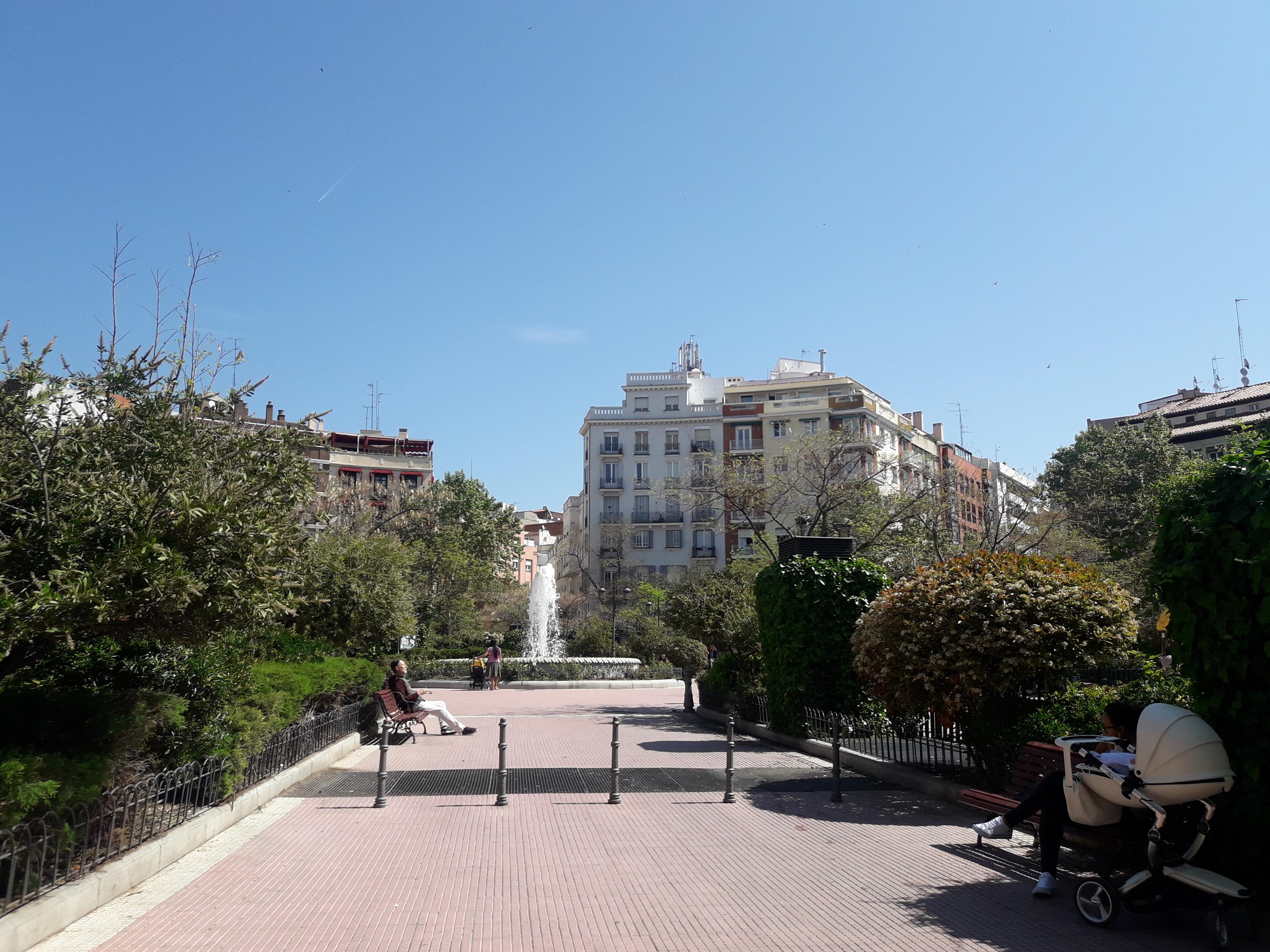
- Interactive map of Plaza de Olavide
- Type: plaza
- Maintained by: Ayuntamiento of Madrid
- Location: Chamberí (Madrid, Spain)
- Coordinates: 40.432767°N 3.701047°W

The plaza de Olavide is an octagonal plaza located in the heart of the Trafalgar neighborhood, in Madrid, Spain.

== History ==
In 1860, the plaza, hitherto known as "Plaza Industrial" was named Plaza de Olavide. By that time, most of the population of the slum of Chamberí lived around the place.

Under a project developed under the purview of the Second Republic's General Plan for Markets, Francisco Javier Ferrero was tasked with building an octagonal market in the place, replacing a previous and smaller one. The market underwent a controlled demolition in November 1974, in a move protested by the neighbors. The refurbished plaza, with new trees and an underground parking lot for 400 vehicles, was formally inaugurated in 1977.
