= Arapiles =

Arapiles may refer to:

- Mount Arapiles, Victoria, Australia
- Arapiles, Salamanca, a village in Spain
- Arapiles (Madrid), a barrio
- Arapiles, a Spanish Navy armored frigate in commission from 1868 to 1878
- Battle of Salamanca, known in Spanish and French as the Battle of Arapiles
