= Tetuan station =

Tetuan station may refer to:

- Tetuan station (Barcelona)
- Tetuán (Madrid Metro)
