= Ríos Rosas =

Ríos Rosas may refer to:

- Antonio de los Ríos y Rosas
- Ríos Rosas (Madrid)
- Ríos Rosas (Madrid Metro)
