= Caja Madrid Obelisk =

Coordinates: 40°27′57.75″N 3°41′21.63″W

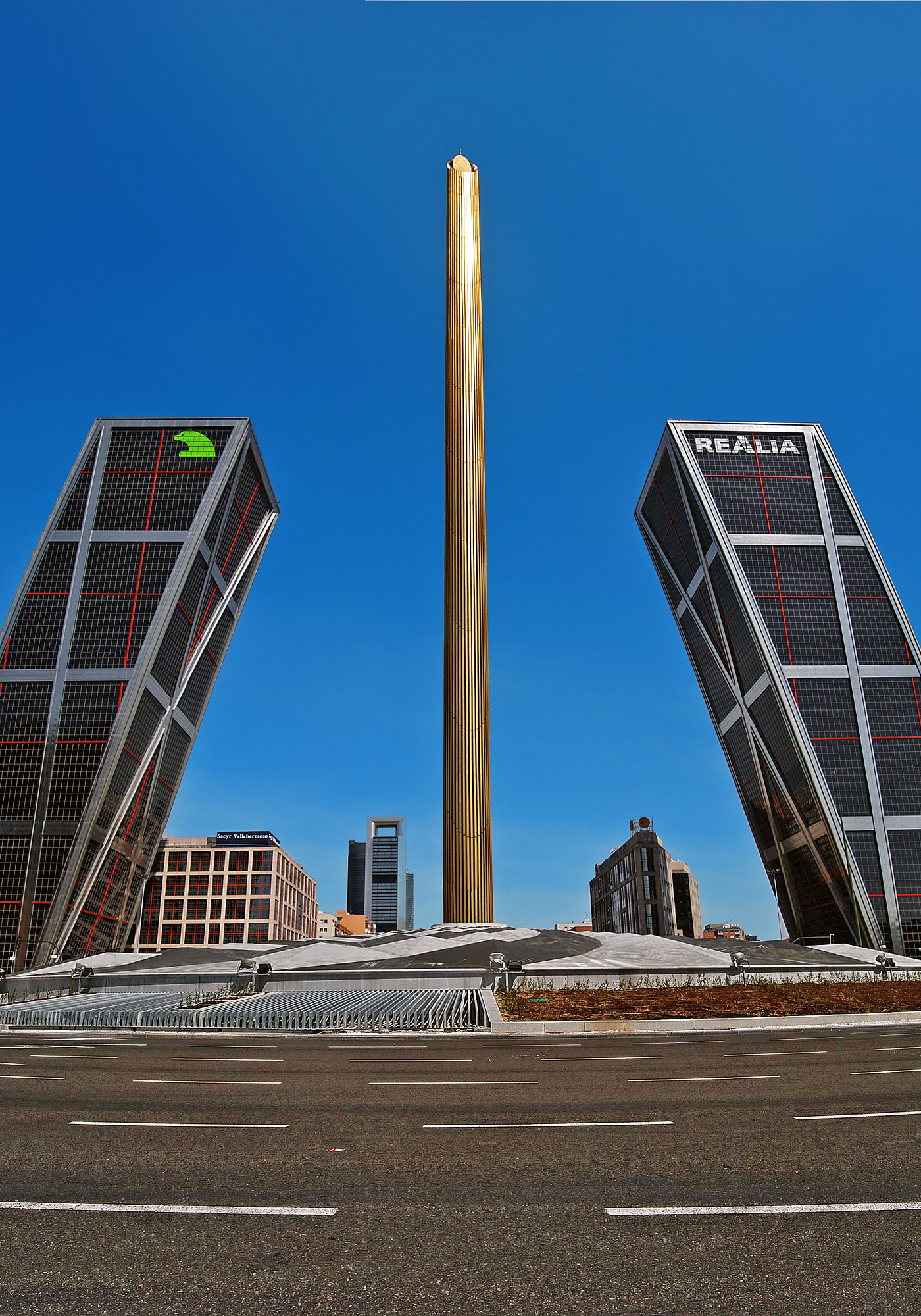
- Interactive map of Caja Madrid Obelisk
- Location: Plaza de Castilla, Madrid, Spain
- Designer: Santiago Calatrava
- Material: Bronze, gold, concrete
- Height: 92 m
- Opening date: 23 December 2009
- Dedicated to: 300th anniversary of Caja Madrid

The Caja Madrid Obelisk (Spanish: Obelisco de la Caja, Columna de Calatrava or Obelisco de Calatrava) is an obelisk designed by Santiago Calatrava located in the Plaza de Castilla in Madrid, Spain. The monument—intended to commemorate the 300th anniversary of Caja Madrid—was donated by the savings bank to the city of Madrid.

== History ==
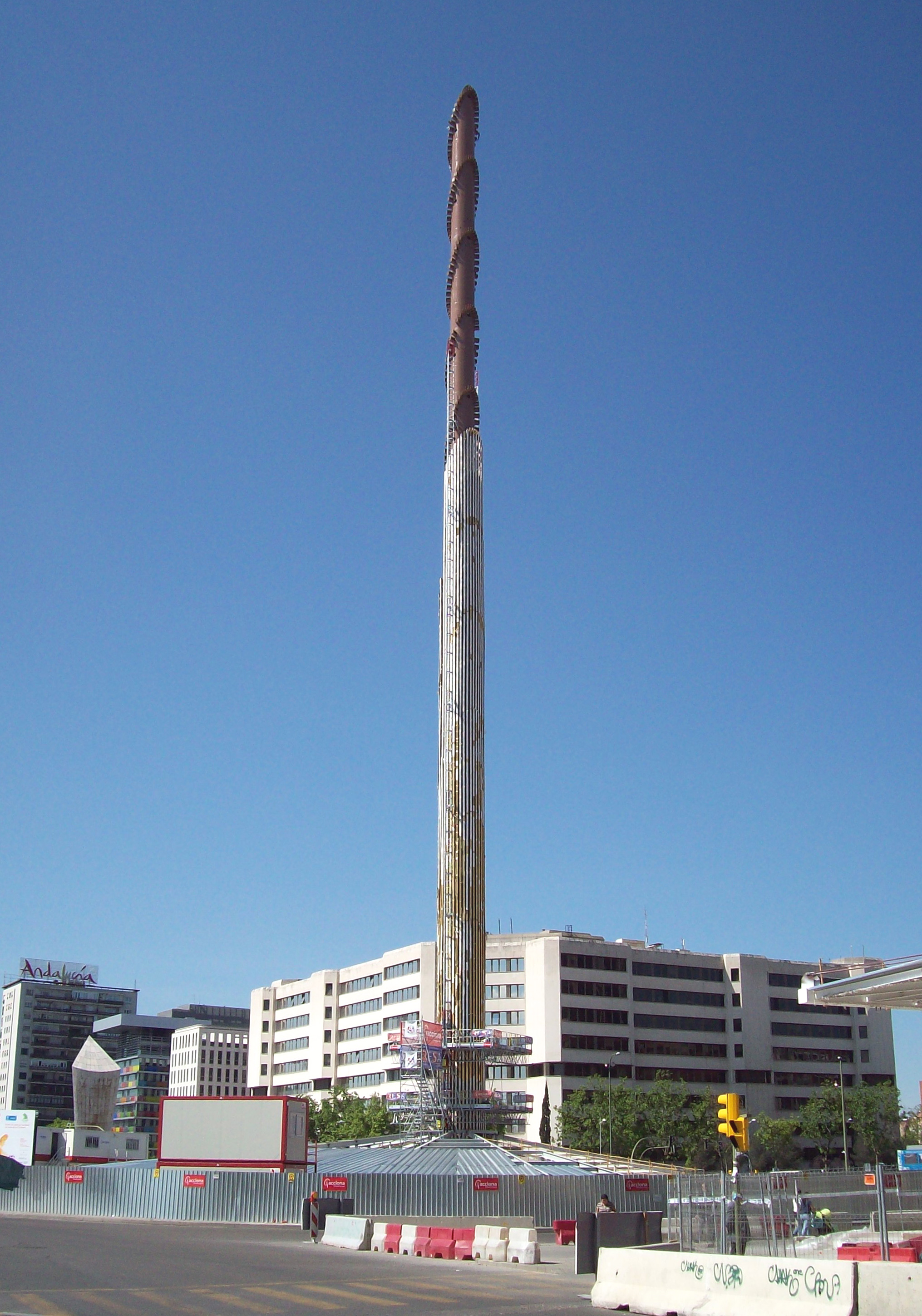
The obelisk under construction (May 15, 2009).

To mark the 300th anniversary of its foundation (1702–2002), Caja Madrid commissioned the architect and sculptor Santiago Calatrava to design a monument that would be donated to the Villa de Madrid.

It was conceived as a monument able to describe a helicoidal movement, yet the hefty maintenance costs (over 150,000 euros/year) led to the Ayuntamiento de Madrid's preference for keeping it "static".

According to the initial project, the work would measure 120 meters tall. However, the complex network of tunnels that pass underneath the Plaza de Castilla made this original project unworkable, because of its weight. A decision was therefore made to lower the height to 92 metres.

In early October 2007, the Caja contracted construction company Acciona to carry out the project, and in July of the following year building work began, having dismantled the fountain which existed previously at the selected spot. The obelisk was unveiled on 23 December 2009 by Juan Carlos I. Maintenance was supposed to be paid by Caja Madrid, but its problems during the 2008–2014 Spanish financial crisis, leading to its transformation in Bankia, caused it to be assumed by the city.

== Description ==
Caja Madrid decided to call this monument an obelisk despite it lacking the typical pyramid-like tip. In fact, its design is inspired by the Endless Column, a work of 29.33 meters in height by Romanian sculptor Constantin Brâncuși, built in 1938 in Târgu Jiu, Romania.

Calatrava described his work as "a mobile obelisk participating in the masculinity of the vertical [direction] and the delicacy and femininity of movement."

The inner core of the work, 92 meters high, is a cylindrical metal shaft of equal length and 2 meters in diameter, which rests on three metal legs. These, which weigh 50 tons each, are based in turn on three concrete piles 80 inches in diameter and 26 meters long. Instead of supporting the mast directly above its long axis, it was decided to do it this way to not make extreme demands on pre-existing tunnels at the site.

By fixing the shaft through joints, 462 ribs and 462 bronze strips 7.70 meters in length, line the entire obelisk. These strips have a tilting movement transmitted through the ribs, giving the appearance of an outwardly moving wave of ascension along the spine.
