= Almagro (Madrid) =

- City neighborhood
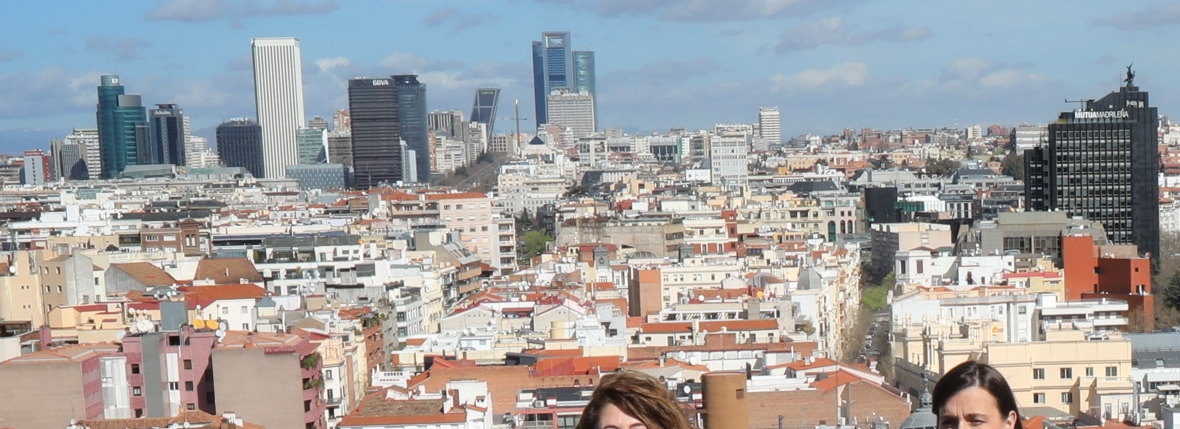
- Interactive map of Almagro
- Coordinates: 40°25′54″N 3°41′39″W
- Country: Spain
- Region: Community of Madrid
- Municipality: Madrid
- District: Chamberí

Almagro is an administrative neighborhood (barrio) of Madrid belonging to the district of Chamberí.
