= Monument to Bravo Murillo (Madrid) =

Statue of Juan Bravo Murillo in Madrid, Spain

Bravo Murillo
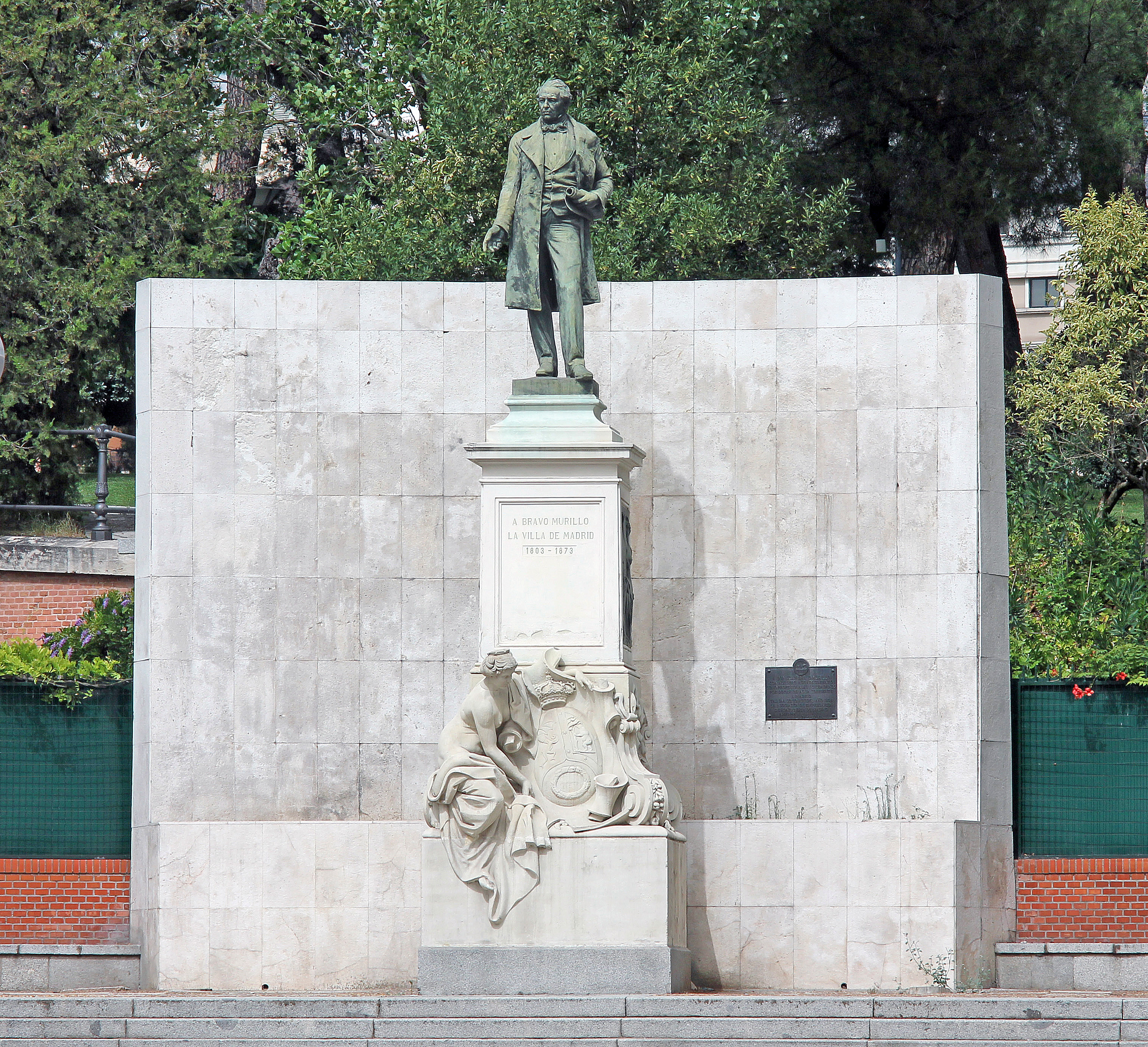
- 40.438899°N 3.703881°W
- Location: Calle de Bravo Murillo, Madrid, Spain
- Designer: Miguel Ángel Trilles
- Material: Bronze, stone
- Opening date: 5 June 1902; 17 December 1963 (re-inauguration)
- Dedicated to: Juan Bravo Murillo

The Monument to Bravo Murillo is an instance of public art in Madrid, Spain. Dedicated to Juan Bravo Murillo, promoter of the Canal de Isabel II, it currently lies at the meeting of the calle de Bravo Murillo and the calle de José Abascal.

== History and description ==
A work by Miguel Ángel Trilles, it was unveiled at its original location on the Glorieta de Bilbao on 5 June 1902 (the ceremony had been delayed several times by bad weather) as part of a series of inaugurations of outdoor sculptures in Madrid on the occasion of the celebrations for the coming of age of King Alfonso XIII, featuring several notable figures such as—aside from Bravo Murillo—Agustín Argüelles, Lope de Vega, Francisco de Quevedo, Eloy Gonzalo and Goya.

An inscription read then: a bravo murillo, la villa de madrid; 17 de mayo de 1902 ("To Bravo Murillo, the Town of Madrid, 17 May 1902").

The original version of the monument had a total height of 8.00 m. The bronze statue represents a standing Bravo Murillo. The original pedestal was made of marble and stone. It features an allegorical female figure embodying the town (villa) of Madrid holding the municipal coat of arms, while two lateral bronze reliefs on the plinth represent Commerce and Industry.

Following the revamp of the glorieta de Bilbao decided in 1961, the monument was removed and, upon request from the Canal de Isabel II, it was relocated next to the main headquarters of the later company at the meeting of the streets of Bravo Murillo and José Abascal, yet when the monument was unveiled for a second time on 17 December 1963 it had lost the original plinth in the process.

The new inscription read: a bravo murillo / la villa de madrid / 1902–1963. Eventually, the date would be changed again to 1803–1873, the lifetime of Bravo Murillo.

A detached limestone wall dedicated to Bravo Murillo and funded by the Association of Plumbing Employers of Madrid (ASEFOSAM) was erected later behind the statue.

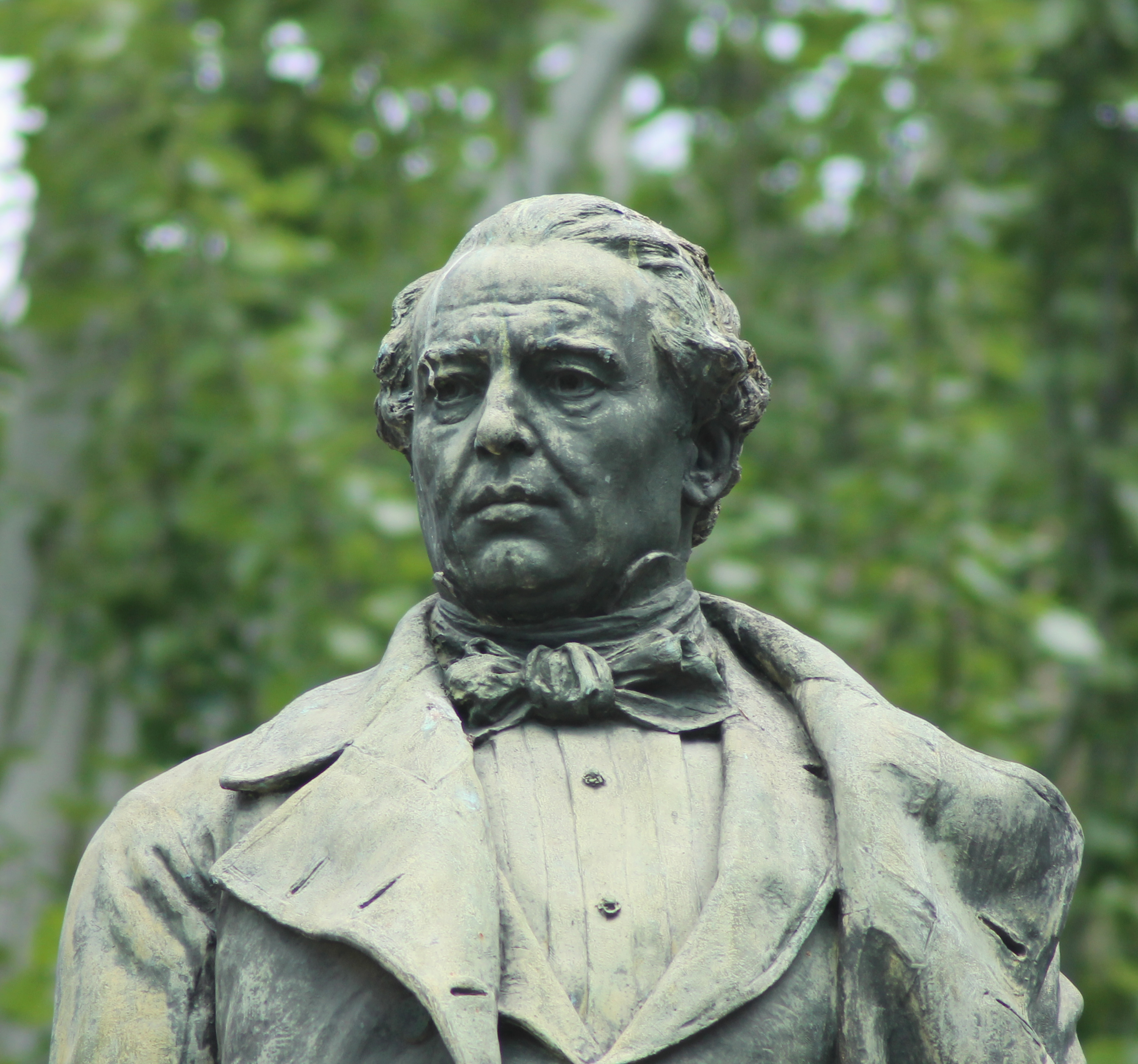
Closer look of the bronze statue

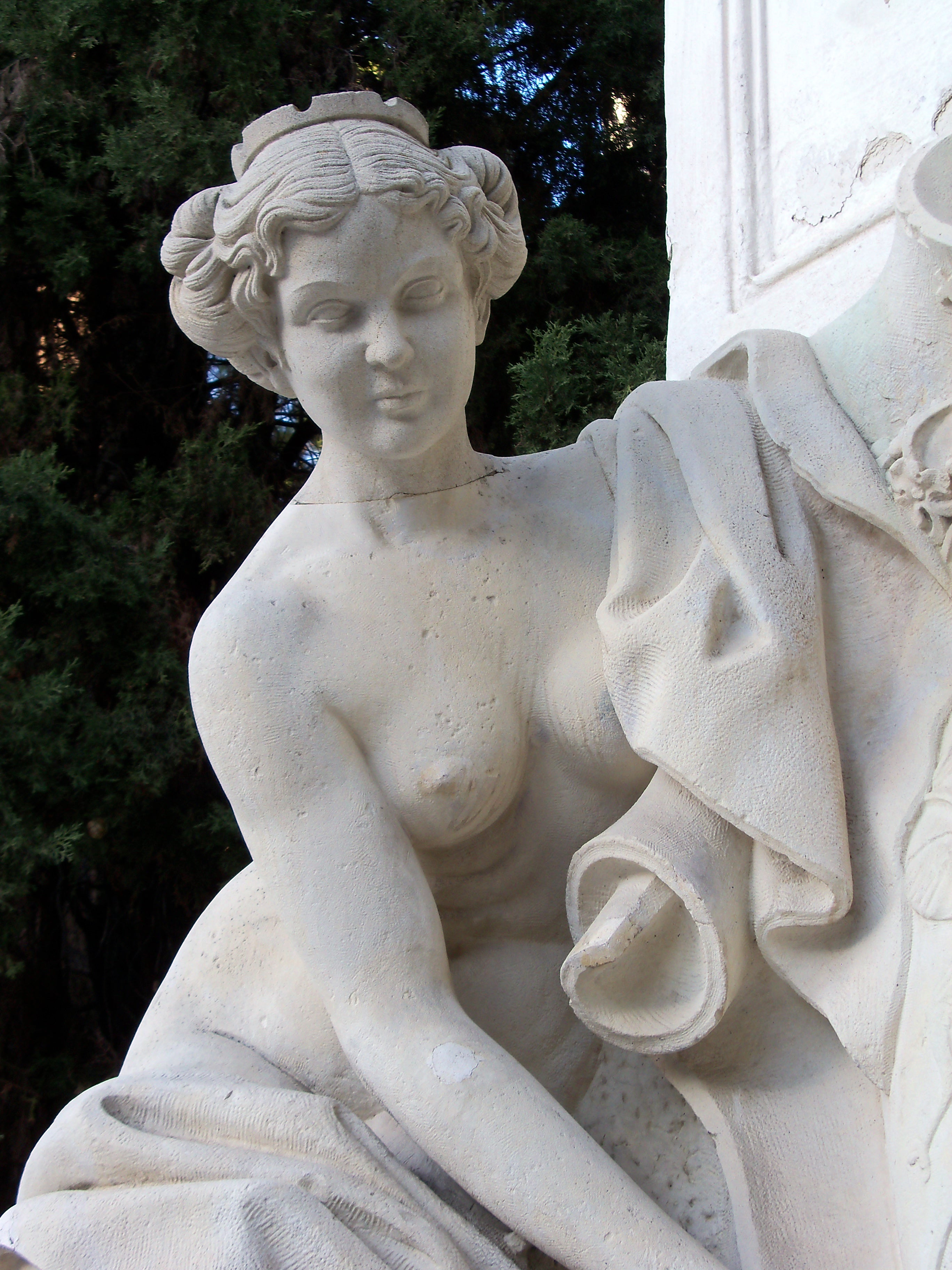
Allegory of Madrid
