= Tetuán (Madrid Metro) =

Madrid Metro station

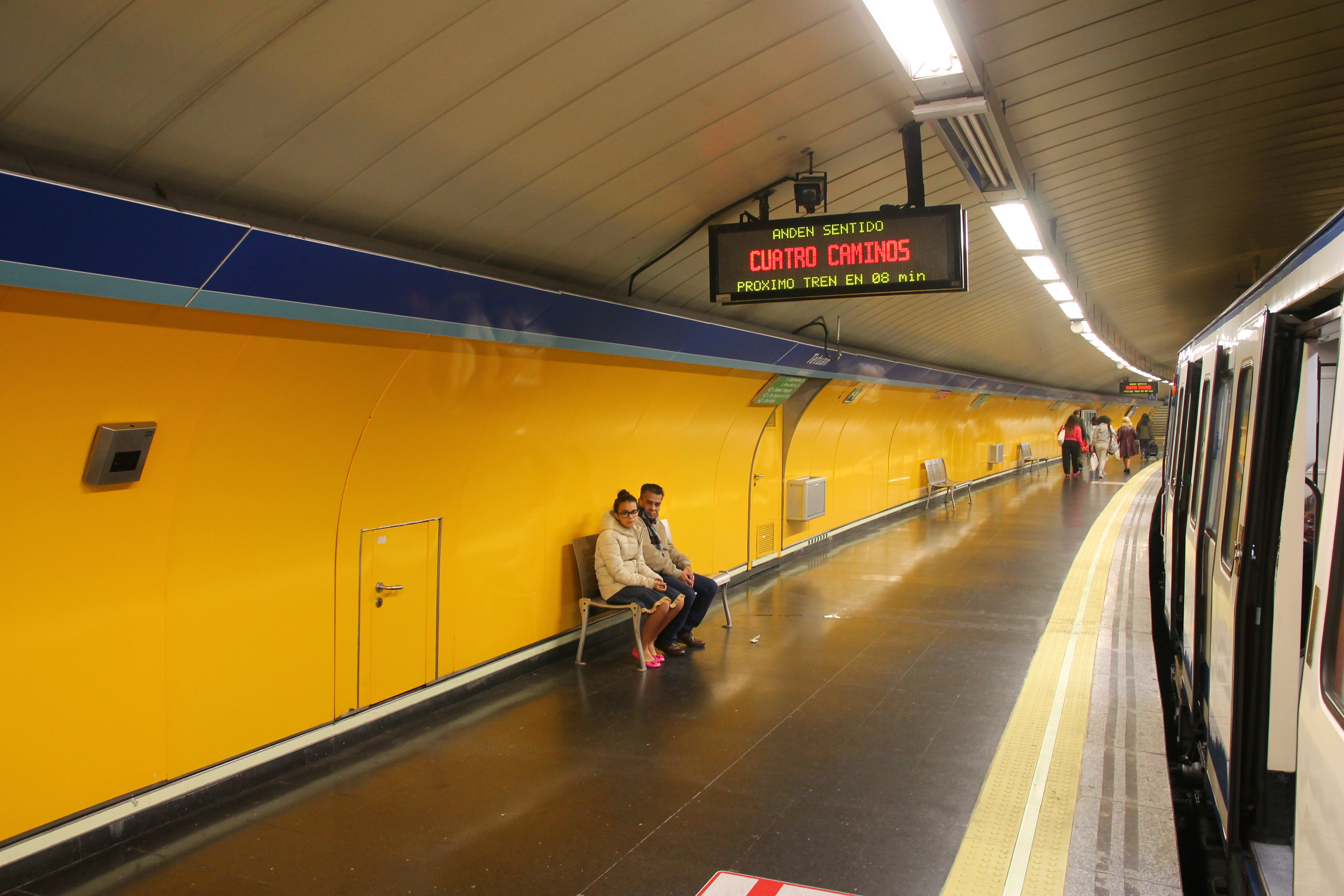
- Platform of the station

General information
- Location: Tetuán, Madrid; Spain
- Coordinates: 40.4605563°N 3.6982512°W
- System: Madrid Metro station
- Owner: CRTM
- Operator: CRTM

Construction
- Structure type: Underground
- Accessible: No

Other information
- Fare zone: A

History
- Opened: 6 March 1929; 97 years ago

Services
Preceding station	Madrid Metro	Following station
Valdeacederas towards Pinar de Chamartín	Line 1	Estrecho towards Valdecarros
Location
- Location within Madrid

Tetuán [teˈtwan] is a station on Line 1 of the Madrid Metro, opened on 3 June 1929. It is named by the district in which it is located, which in turn takes the name of Tétouan, the historical capital of Spanish Morocco. It is located in Zone A.
