= Trafalgar (Madrid) =

Coordinates: 40°25′59″N 3°42′2″W

- City neighborhood
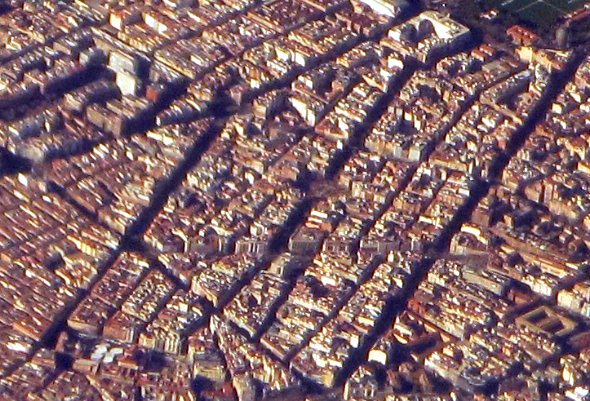

- Country: Spain
- Region: Community of Madrid
- Municipality: Madrid
- District: Chamberí

Area
  - Total: 0.611950 km^{2} (0.236275 sq mi)

Population (2021)
  - Total: 24,748
  - Density: 40,441/km^{2} (104,740/sq mi)

Trafalgar is an administrative neighborhood (barrio) of Madrid belonging to the district of Chamberí. It has an area of 0.611950 km^{2} (0.236275 sq mi). As of 1 February 2021, it has a population of 24,748.

== See also ==
- Plaza de Olavide
