= Chamberí =

District in Madrid, Spain

Coordinates: 40.432792°N 3.697186°W

- District of Madrid
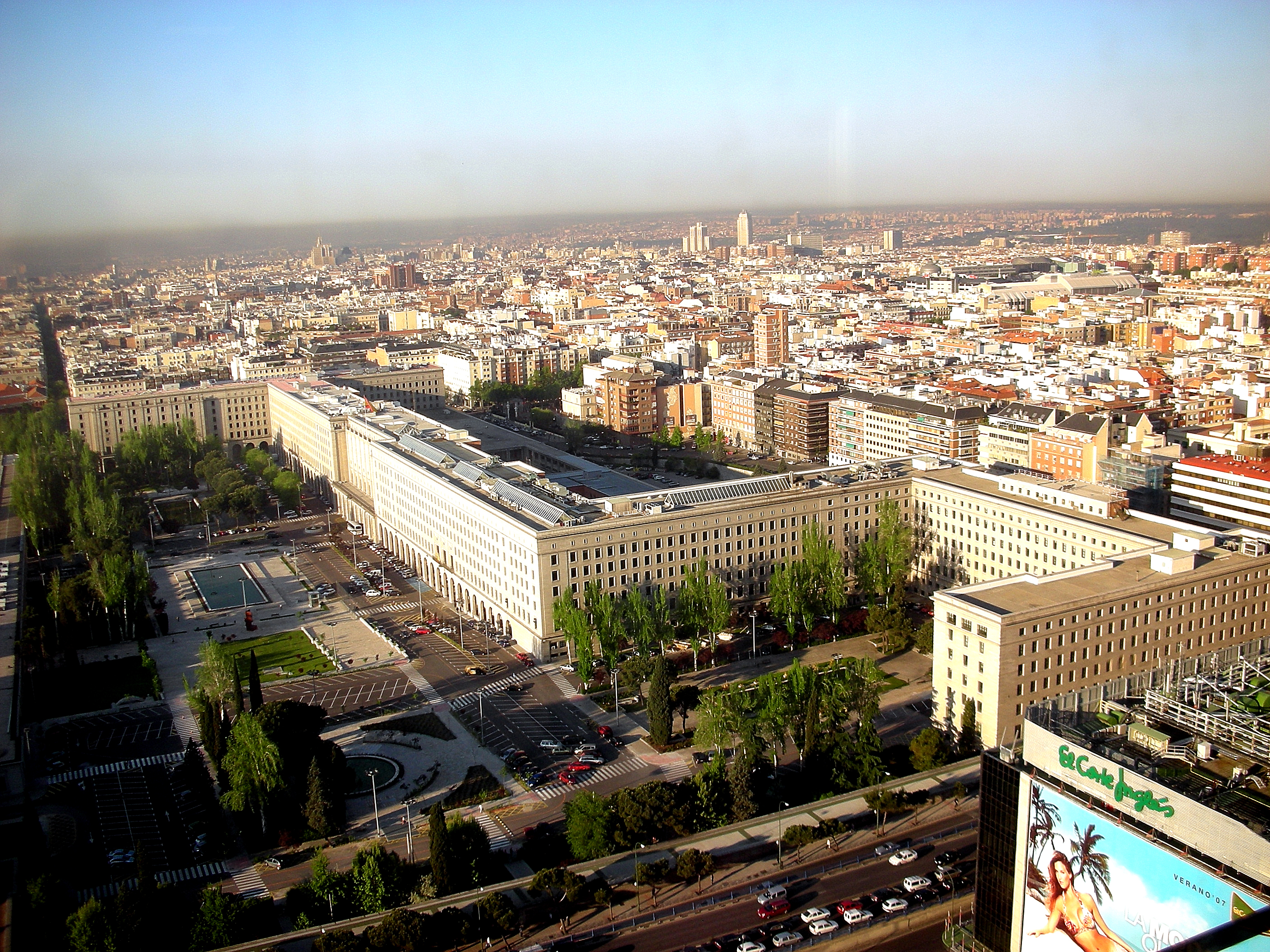
- Nuevos Ministerios
- Interactive map of Chamberí
- Country: Spain
- Region: Community of Madrid
- Municipality: Madrid

Government
  - Councillor-President: Jaime González Taboada (PP, 2023)

Area
  - Total: 4.69 km^{2} (1.81 sq mi)

Population
  - Total: 145,934
  - Density: 31,029/km^{2} (80,360/sq mi)
- Postal code: 28032
- Madrid district number: 7

Chamberí (Spanish pronunciation: [tʃambeˈɾi]) is a district of Madrid, Spain. It is further subdivided into six neighborhoods (Gaztambide, Arapiles, Trafalgar, Almagro, Ríos Rosas and Vallehermoso). The district junta is headquartered at the plaza de Chamberí. The current urban outline was born as part of the Ensanche plan drafted by Carlos María de Castro (approved in 1860).

== See also ==
- Chamberí (Madrid Metro)
- Church of San Fermín de los Navarros
- Beti Jai fronton
- Hospital of Maudes
- Geological and Mining Institute of Spain
- School of Mining Engineering of Madrid
- Sorolla Museum
