= Monument to General Perón (Madrid) =

Monument in Madrid

Juan Domingo Perón
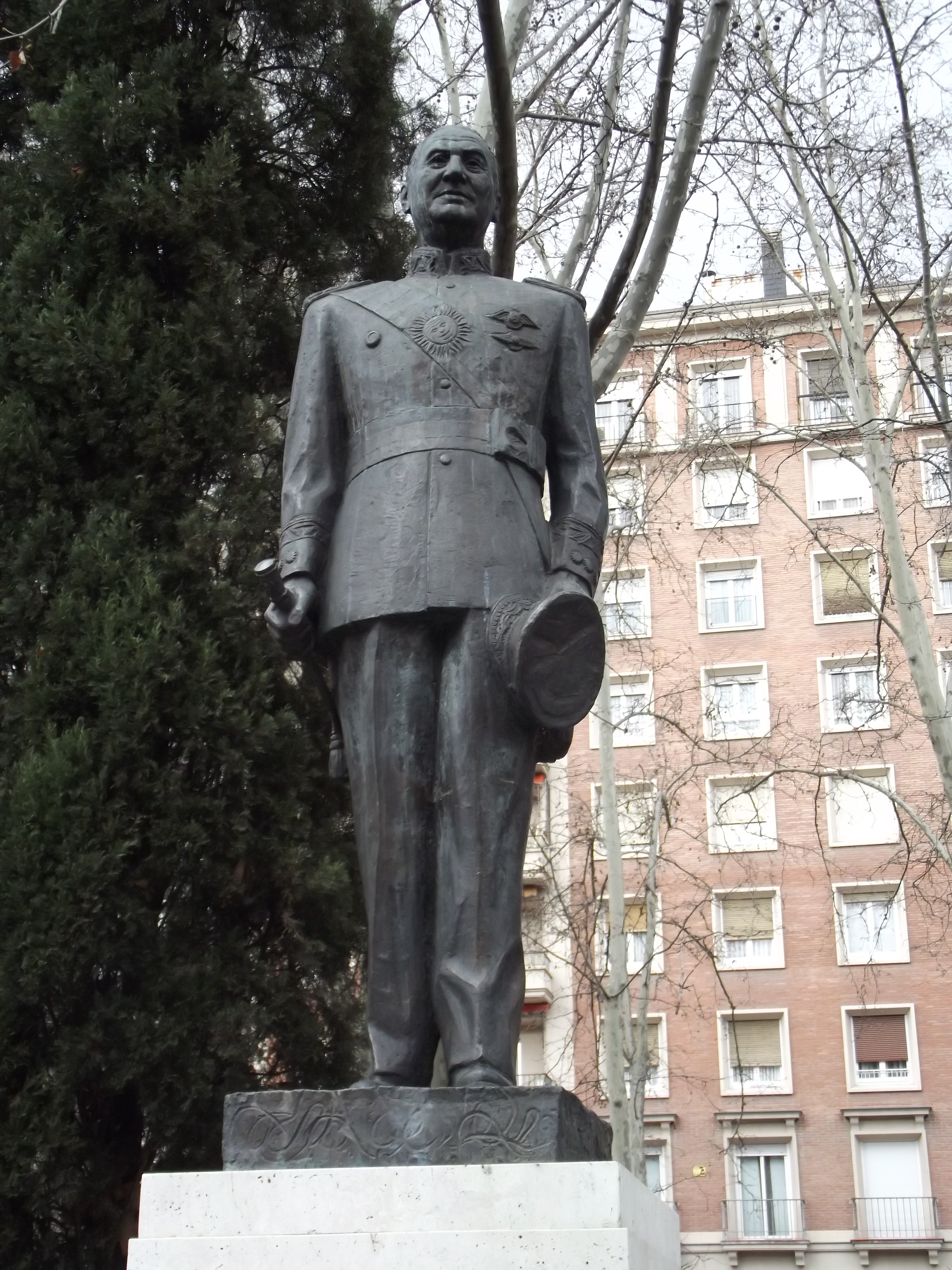
- Interactive map of Juan Domingo Perón
- Location: Avenida del General Perón, Madrid, Spain
- Coordinates: 40.452367°N 3.694994°W
- Designer: Agustín de la Herrán
- Material: Bronze, granite
- Height: 2.10 m (statue)
- Opening date: 1 July 1975
- Dedicated to: Juan Domingo Perón

The Monument to General Perón is an instance of public art in Madrid, Spain. Located at the namesake avenue, it consists of a bronze statue of the Argentine president and general Juan Domingo Perón designed by Agustín de la Herrán put on top of a granite pedestal.

== History and description ==
According to the Argentine ambassador in Spain, the project was reportedly the first monument dedicated to Perón to be erected outside Argentina's borders. The monument was a token of gratitude for the support provided by Perón to the Francoist regime during the immediate period after World War II, amid the international isolation of the dictatorship.

Designed by Agustín de la Herrán, the full-body leading sculpture, cast in bronze and 2.10 metre high, represents a standing Perón, dressed with a full dress uniform and carrying the presidential staff. The design of the granite plinth was entrusted to a municipal architect of the Ayuntamiento de Madrid.

The inscription in the main plaque displays the "paladín de la amistad argentino española" ("Paladin of the Argentine–Spanish friendship") epithet.

The monument was unveiled on 1 July 1975, on occasion for the first anniversary of Peron's death, in the Madrilenian avenue already named after him during a ceremony attended by the Miguel Ángel García-Lomas (Mayor of Madrid), José Campano (Argentine ambassador), León Herrera (Minister of Information and Tourism), Pedro Cortina Mauri (Minister of Foreign Affairs), and the Duke of Cádiz (President of the Institute of Hispanic Culture), among others. Before the inauguration, authorities paid a visit to the nearby Monument to Isabella the Catholic in order to deposit a floral tribute.
