= Almenara (Madrid) =

Coordinates: 40.4713°N 3.6955°W

- City neighborhood
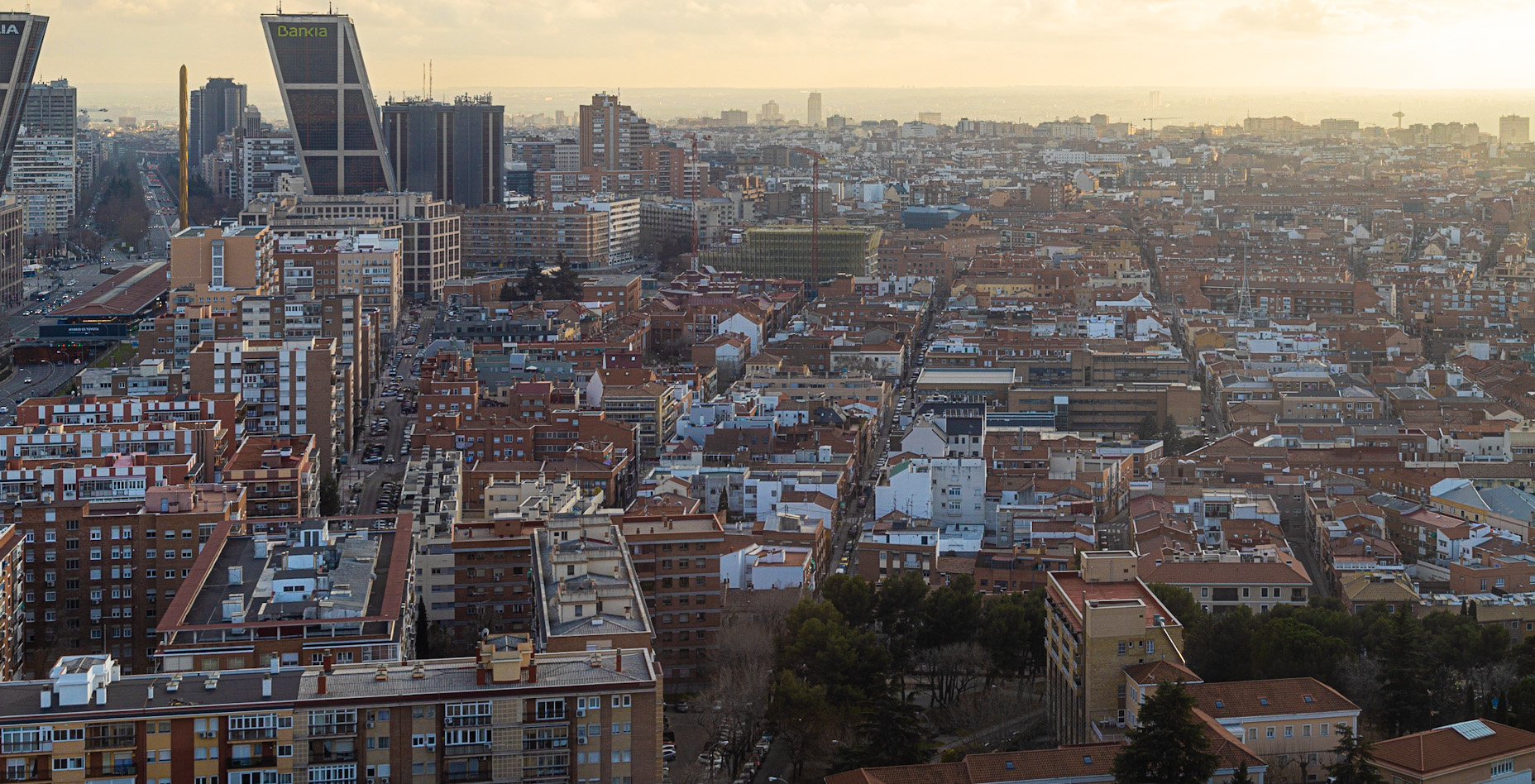
- Interactive map of Almenara
- Country: Spain
- Region: Community of Madrid
- Municipality: Madrid
- District: Tetuán

Area
  - Total: 0.999369 km^{2} (0.385859 sq mi)

Population (2020)
  - Total: 23,114
  - Density: 23,129/km^{2} (59,903/sq mi)

Almenara, also popularly known by the name of La Ventilla, is an administrative neighborhood of Madrid located in the district of Tetuán. (Note: It corresponds to zone 6.4 according to the numbering provided by the City Council.) It has an area of 0.999369 km^{2} (0.385859 sq mi). As of February 2020, it has a population of 23,114. The Avenida de Asturias crosses the area.
