= Ríos Rosas (Madrid) =

Coordinates: 40°26′32″N 3°41′50″W

- Neighborhood of Madrid
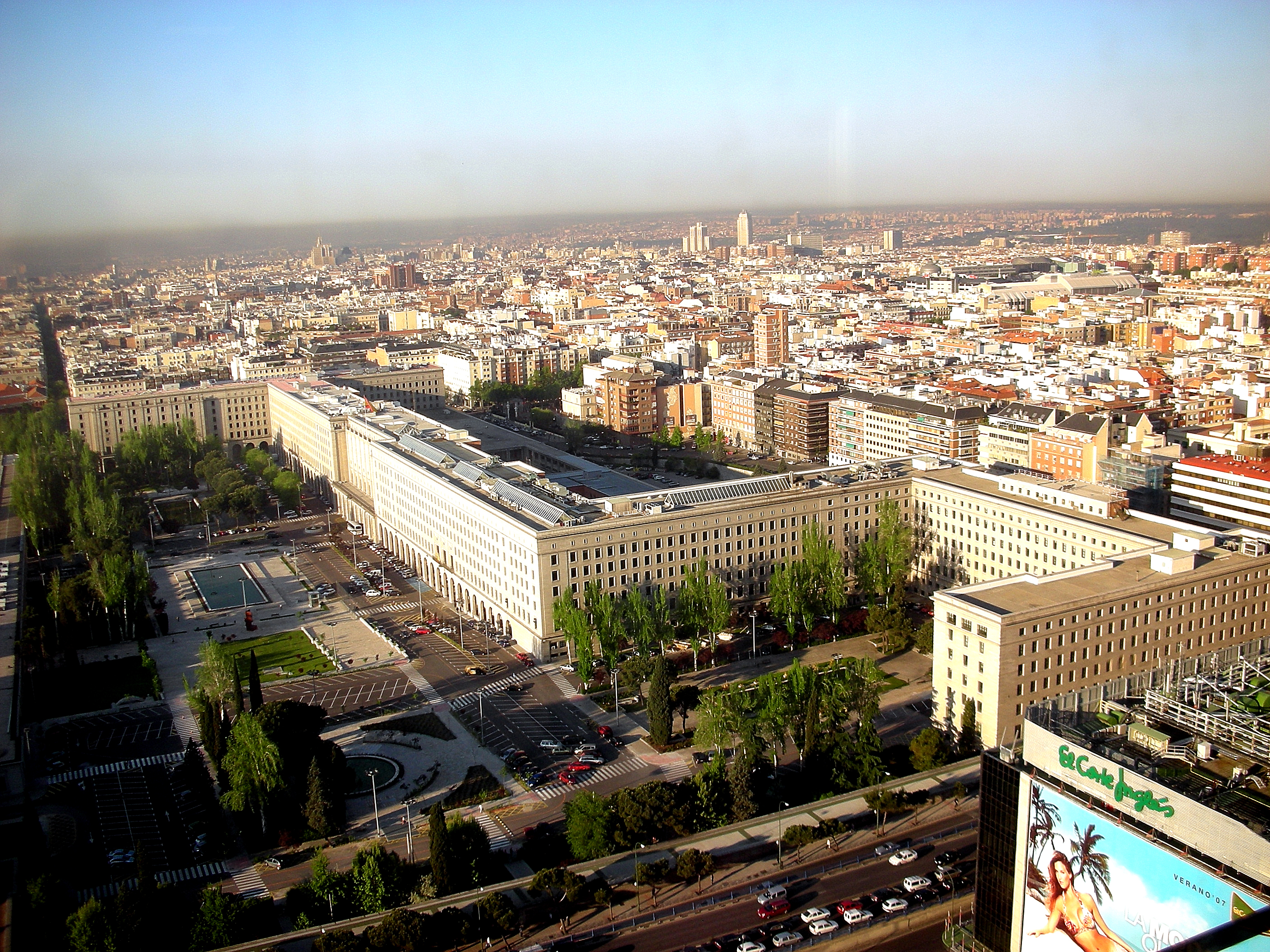
- Country: Spain
- Autonomous community: Madrid
- Municipality: Madrid
- District: Chamberí

Ríos Rosas [ˈri.os ˈro.sas] is a neighborhood of Madrid belonging to the district of Chamberí. It takes its name from Antonio de los Ríos Rosas, a 19th-century politician.

The ward is served by the Madrid Metro station called Ríos Rosas, one of the first stations to be opened on the network.

The ward has recently filled up with modern pubs and restaurants, especially in Ponzano Street.
