= Arapiles (Madrid) =

Coordinates: 40°26′3″N 3°42′28″W

- Ward
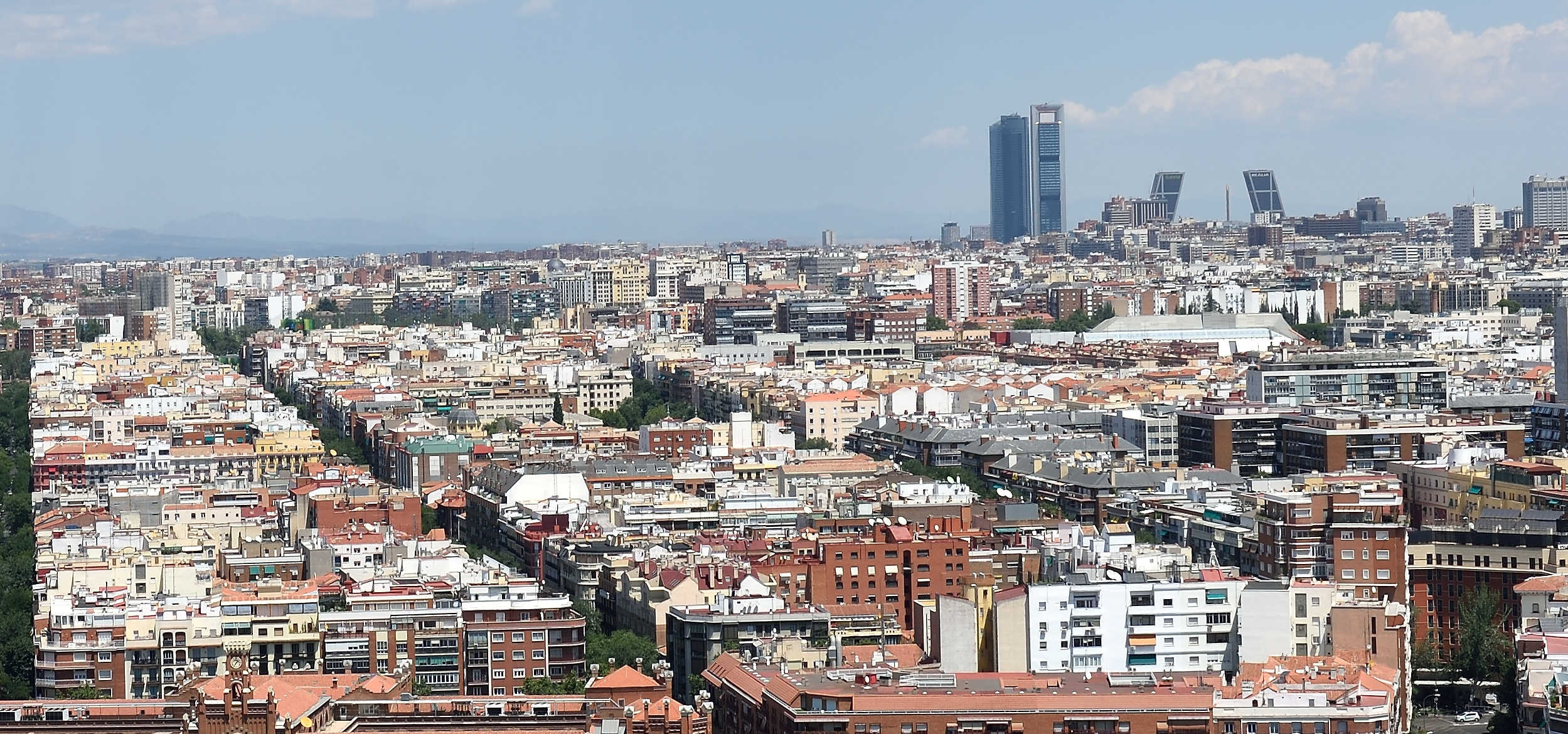
- Interactive map of Arapiles
- Country: Spain
- Autonomous community: Madrid
- Municipality: Madrid
- District: Chamberí

Area
  - Total: 0.578534 km^{2} (0.223373 sq mi)

Population (2021)
  - Total: 24,348
  - Density: 42,000/km^{2} (110,000/sq mi)

Arapiles is an administrative neighborhood (barrio) of Madrid belonging to the district of Chamberí. It has an area of 0.578534 km^{2} (0.223373 sq mi). As of 1 February 2021, it has a population of 24,348.
