= Castillejos (Madrid) =

Coordinates: 40°27′41″N 3°41′33″W

- City neighborhood
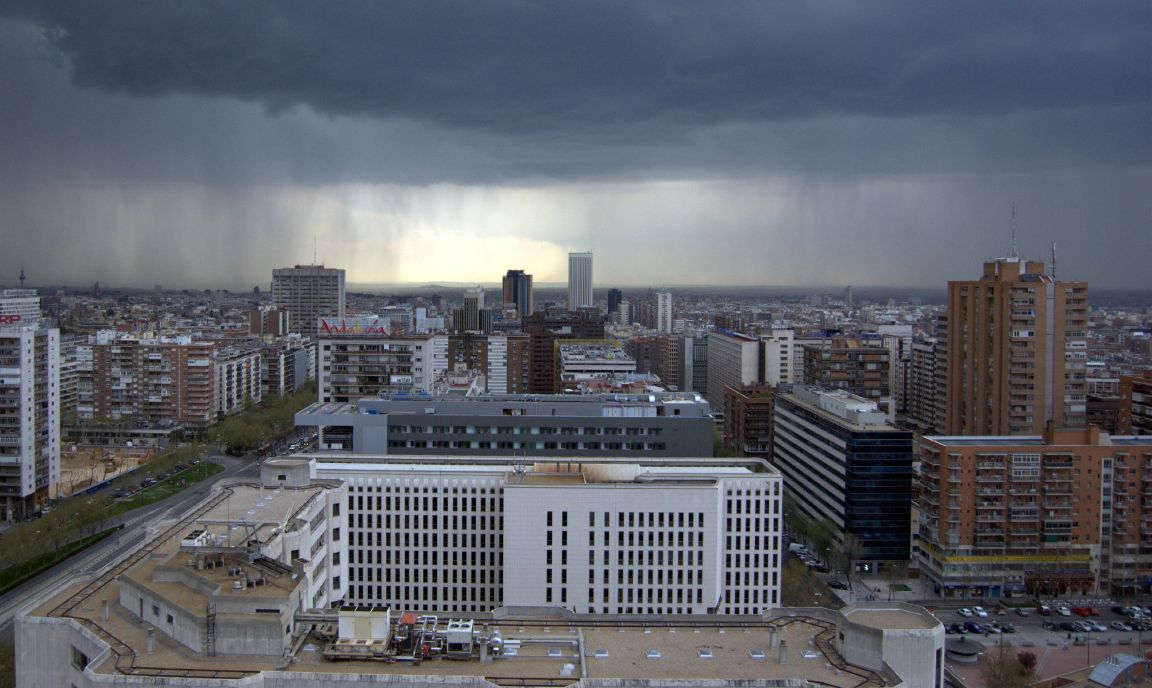
- Interactive map of Castillejos
- Country: Spain
- Region: Community of Madrid
- Municipality: Madrid
- District: Tetuán

Area
  - Total: 0.708501 km^{2} (0.273554 sq mi)

Population (2020)
  - Total: 20,870
  - Density: 29,460/km^{2} (76,290/sq mi)

Castillejos is an administrative neighborhood (barrio) of Madrid located in the district of Tetuán. It has an area of 0.708501 km^{2} (0.273554 sq mi). As of February 2020, it has a population of 20,870.
