= Geological and Mining Institute of Spain =

- Instituto Geológico y Minero de España (Spanish)
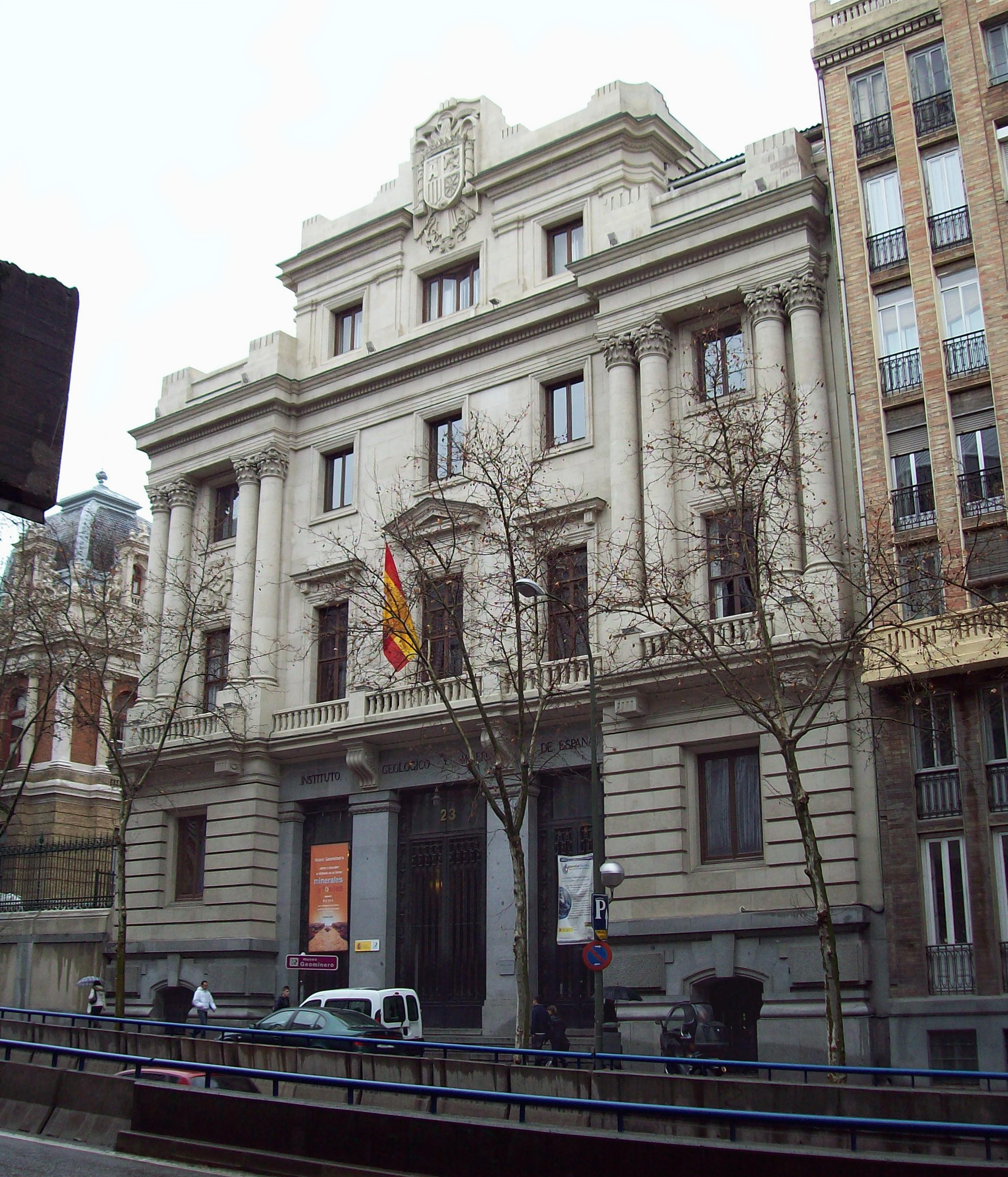

- Location within Spain
- 40.442041°N 3.69962°W
- Location: Madrid, Spain

Spanish Cultural Heritage
- Official name: Instituto Geológico y Minero de España
- Type: Non-movable
- Criteria: Monument
- Designated: 1998
- Reference no.: RI-51-0010188

The Geological and Mining Institute of Spain (Spanish: Instituto Geológico y Minero de España) is a research institute located in Madrid, Spain. It is run under the auspices of the Ministry of Science.

== History ==
The origins of the institute go back to the nineteenth century when a commission was established to work on the geological map of Spain.

The building which houses the institute is on Ríos Rosas street in the Chamberí district of Madrid. Next door is the School of Mining Engineering of Madrid, which was built in 1893, whereas the institute building, designed by Francisco Javier de Luque, was formally opened in 1926. The opening took place during the International Geological Congress which Spain hosted that year.

In collaboration with the Spanish Geological Society (Sociedad Geológica de España or SGE), the Institute has drawn up a list of internationally important geosites in Spain. This work, which began in 1999, is part of the Global Geosites project promoted by the International Union of Geological Sciences in the 1990s and subsequently supported by UNESCO.

== Museum ==
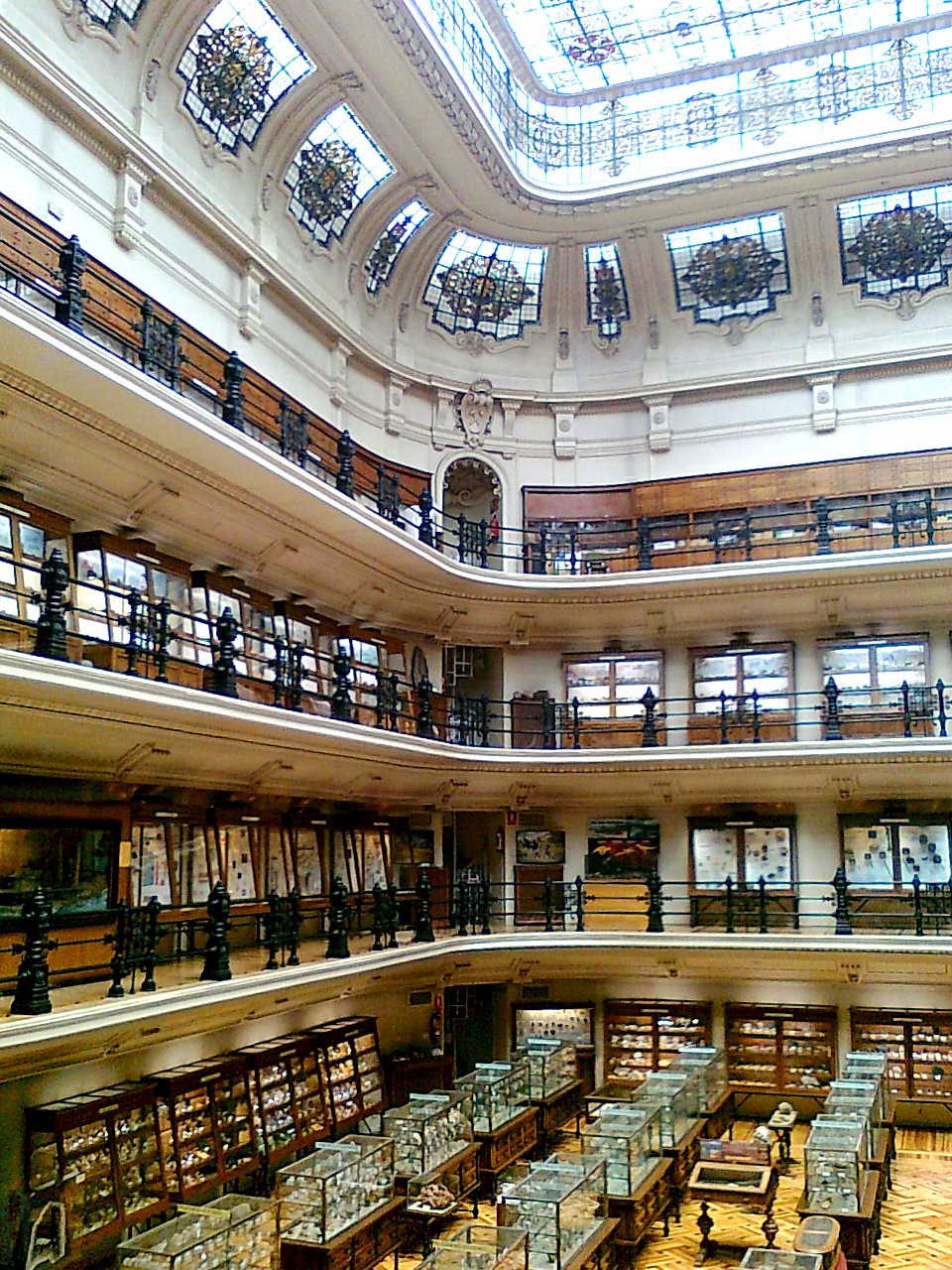
Museum

Inside the building is a geological museum. It is housed in a large hall with a stained glass roof. It was initially used for the International Geological Congress of 1926. The museum opened the following year.It is currently known as the Museo Geominero.

== Heritage listing ==
The building was declared Bien de Interés Cultural in 1998.

== See also ==
- School of Mining Engineering of Madrid
