= School of Mining Engineering of Madrid =

- Escuela Técnica Superior de Ingenieros de Minas de Madrid (Spanish)
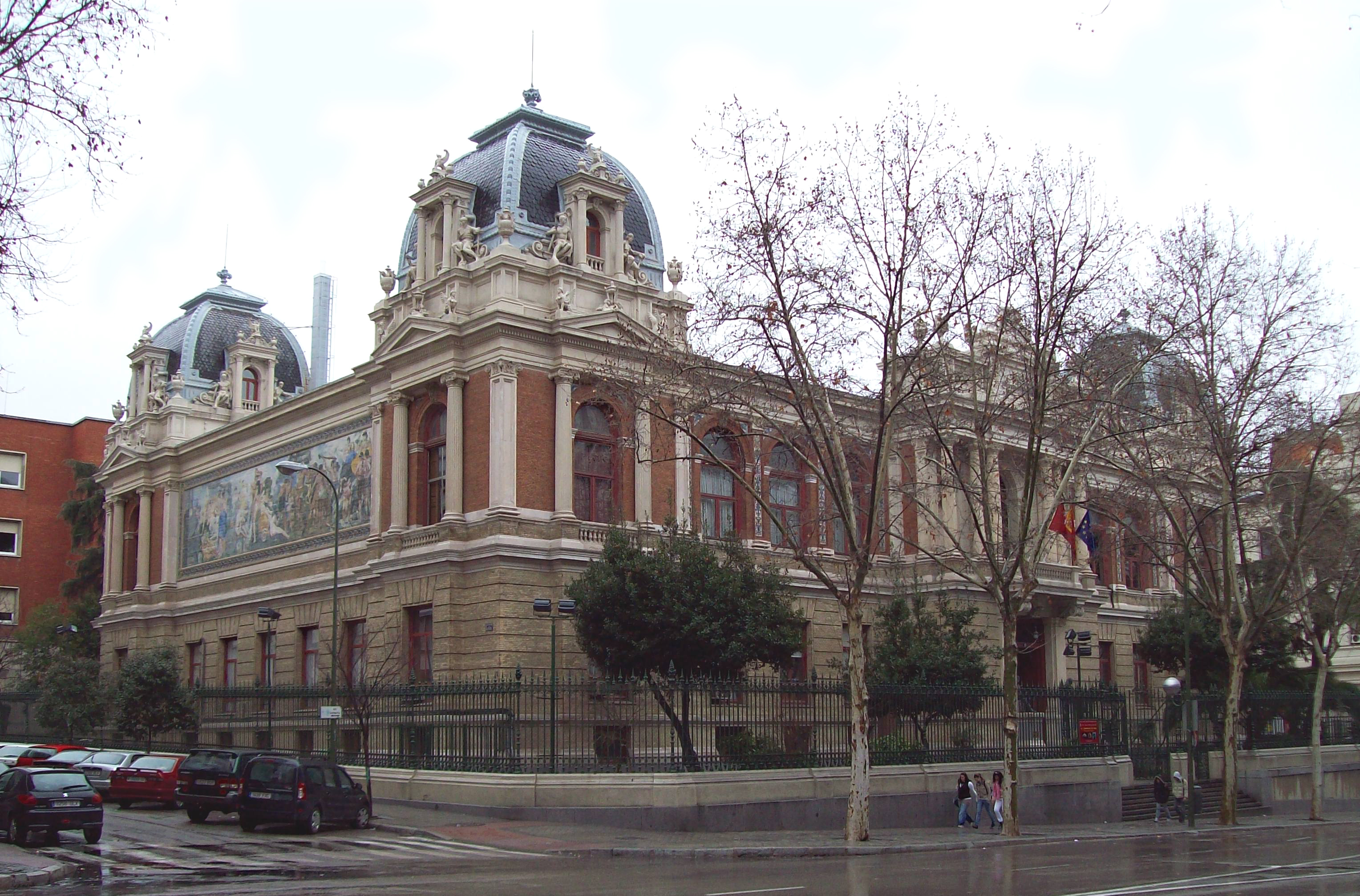

- Location within Spain
- 40.442168°N 3.700376°W
- Location: Madrid, Spain

Site notes
- Architect: Ricardo Velázquez Bosco

Spanish Cultural Heritage
- Official name: Escuela Técnica Superior de Ingenieros de Minas de Madrid
- Type: Non-movable
- Criteria: Monument
- Designated: 1985
- Reference no.: RI-51-0005005

The School of Mining Engineering of Madrid (Spanish: Escuela Técnica Superior de Ingenieros de Minas y Energia) is located in calle Ríos Rosas, Madrid, Spain. It is one of the engineering schools of the Technical University of Madrid which was founded in 1971 through the integration of the Higher Technical Schools.

== History ==
The mining school is older than the nineteenth-century building in which it is housed. It was founded in 1777 as the Academia de Minería y Geografía Subterránea de Almadén, located at Almadén, site of an important mercury mine, approximately 300 km south of Madrid. The curriculum was influenced by the Freiberg University of Mining and Technology.

Mercury became very valuable in the Americas in the mid 16th century due to the introduction of amalgamation, a process that uses mercury to extract the metals from gold and silver ore. Mercury was exported to the Americas, although there was also a source of mercury in Peru.

As Spain was impacted by the loss of its South American colonies, and the increasing economic importance of coal, Almadén became less appropriate for the site of a national mining school. It was relocated to Madrid in the 1830s.

== Building ==
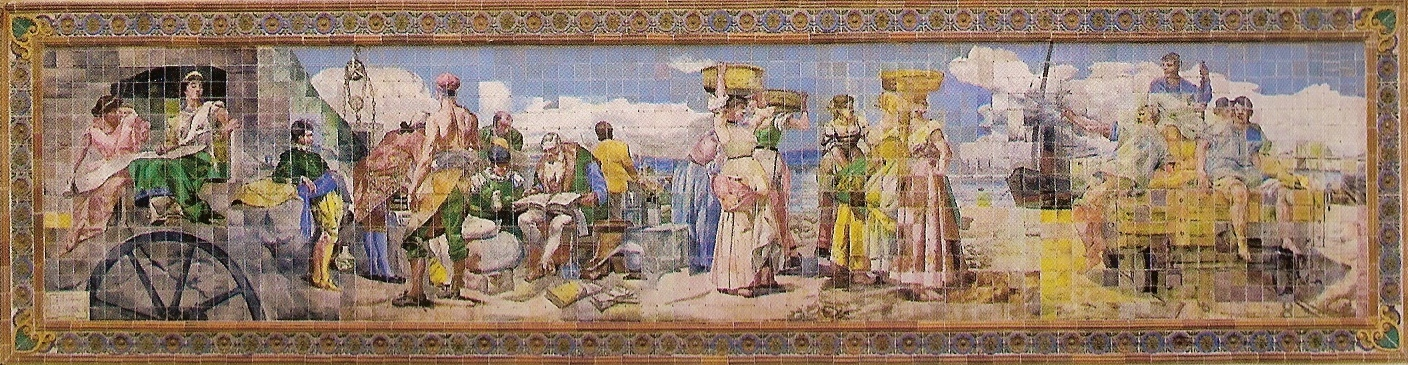
ceramic mural

It was designed by Ricardo Velázquez Bosco. Like some other buildings by this architect, it features ceramic decorations by Daniel Zuloaga. It was declared Bien de Interés Cultural in 1985.

== See also ==
- Exposición Nacional de Minería (1883)
- Geological and Mining Institute of Spain
- Palacio de Minería (Mexico)
