= Valdeacederas =

Coordinates: 40°28′7″N 3°42′20″W

- City neighborhood
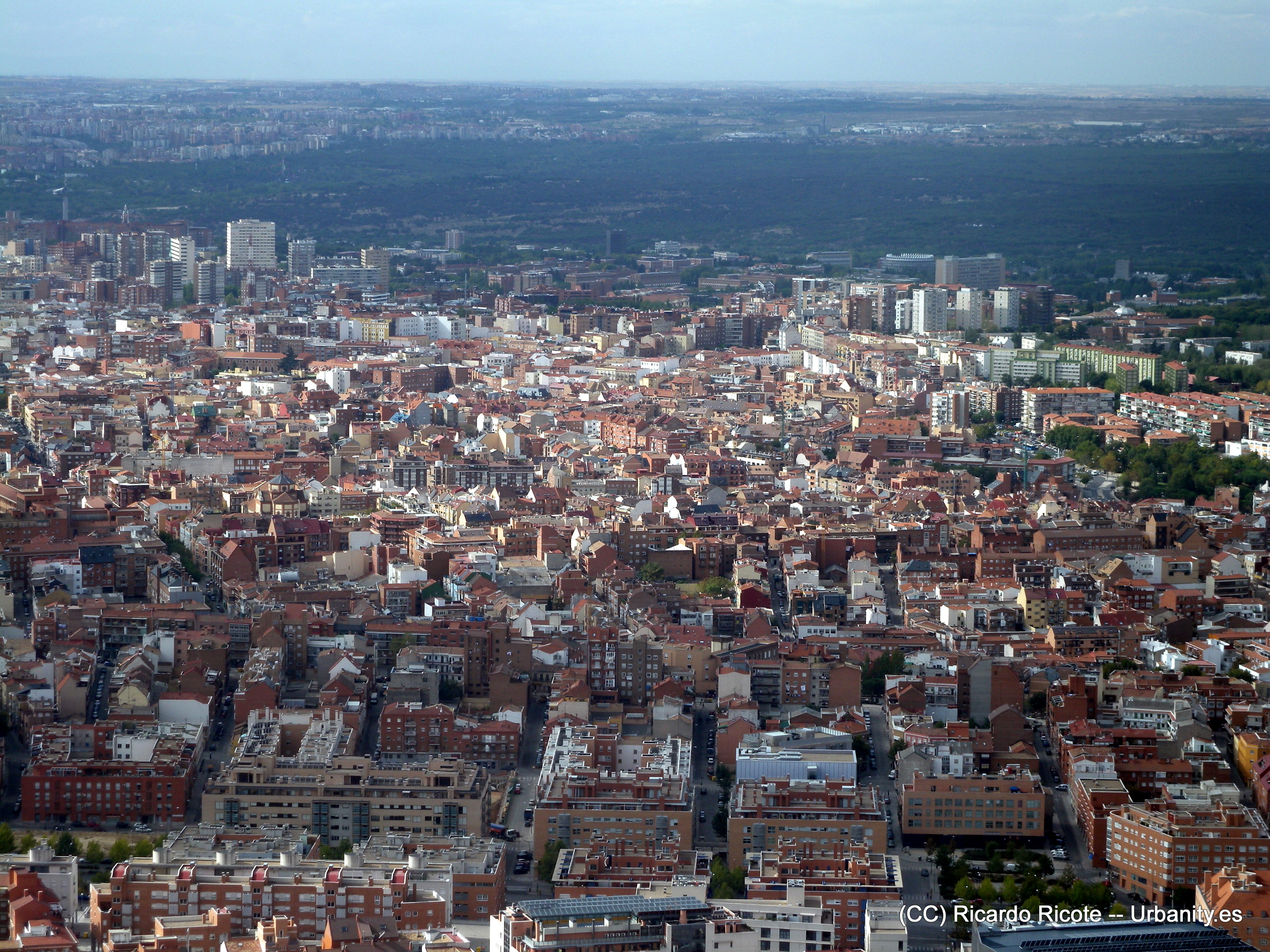

- Country: Spain
- Region: Community of Madrid
- Municipality: Madrid
- District: Tetuán

Valdeacederas ([baldeaθeˈðeɾas], "Sorrel Valley") is an administrative neighborhood (barrio) of Madrid belonging to the district of Tetuán.
