= Tetuán, Madrid =

Tetuán
- City district
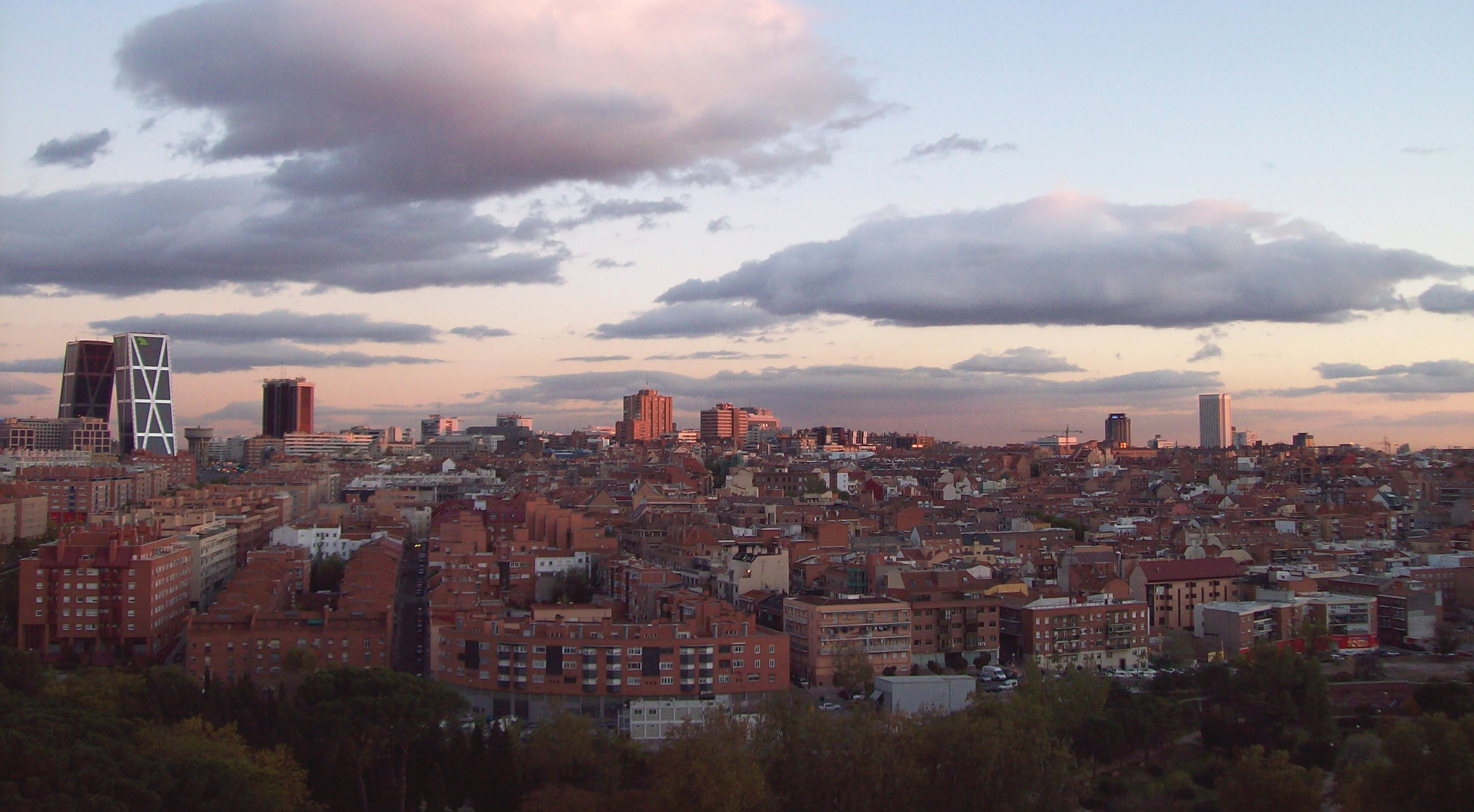

- Coordinates: 40°25′02″N 3°42′19″W
- Country: Spain
- Region: Community of Madrid
- Municipality: Madrid

Government
  - Councillor-President: Paula Gómez-Angulo Amorós (PP, 2023)

Area
  - Total: 5.38 km^{2} (2.08 sq mi)

Population
  - Total: 155,649
  - Density: 28,888/km^{2} (74,820/sq mi)
- Postal code: 28032
- Madrid district number: 6

Tetuán (Spanish pronunciation: [teˈtwan], [tetuˈan]) is a district of Madrid, Spain.

== Geography ==
=== Subdivision ===
Featuring a total area of around 540 hectares (1,300 acres), the district is divided into 6 administrative neighborhoods (barrios): Almenara, Bellas Vistas, Berruguete, Castillejos, Cuatro Caminos and Valdeacederas.

Neighborhoods in the district

== History ==
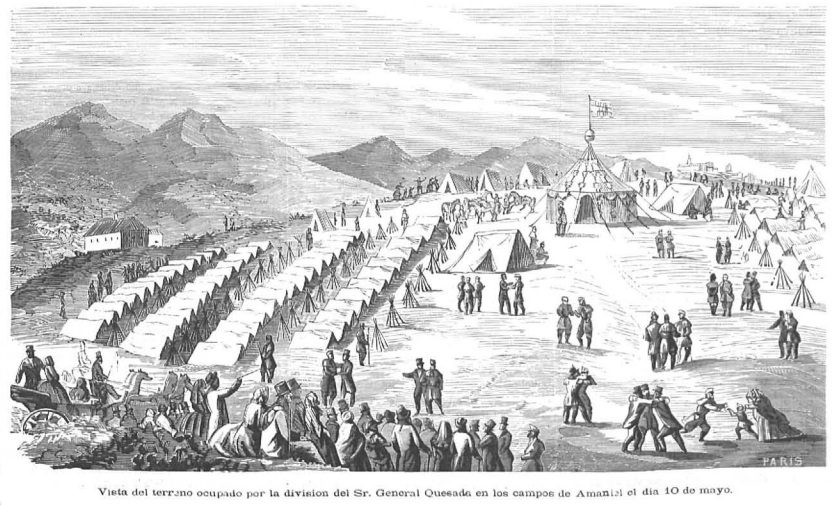
Engraving depicting the 1860 camp at the fields of Amaniel.

When Leopoldo O'Donnell returned with his forces to Spain after the 1859–60 African War, the latter camped at a spot north of Madrid known as the Campos de Amaniel ("Fields of Amaniel") while a triumphal entry into the capital was being arranged for May 11th. Some authors link the origin of the neighborhood to the camp, which would have acquired permanent structures as well as shops over time. The area was renamed Tetuán de las Victorias ("Tetouan of the Victories"), after Tetouan, the Moroccan city where the victorious soldiers had come from. Other authors claim that there were earlier buildings on the area.

The current district also comprises part of the territory of the former municipality of Chamartín de la Rosa, annexed by the municipality of Madrid in 1948.

The community is culturally diverse, with significant populations of African and South American immigrants, although Filipinos constitute the largest foreign population group in the district. Filipinos form the largest immigrant group in four of the district's six neighborhoods (Bellas Vistas, Berruguete, Castillejos and Cuatro Caminos), and the majority of Madrid's Filipino community lives in the district.

== Architecture ==
Some areas of Tetuán have old and modest housing, characterised by one or two storeys and a rural appearance. The older ones are in a popular Neo-Mudéjar style with decorations in brick. They were self-built by masons who brought home a cheaper version of the techniques they were paid to apply in the then-building Ensanche of Madrid. These areas are contrasted with the business area of AZCA (Cuatro Caminos neighborhood), located in the southeastern corner of the district, and that features skyscrapers such as the Torre Picasso. Many neighbors frame the contrast in terms of a dichotomy lined up along the calle de Bravo Murillo: East of the street–rich; West of the street–poor.

Tetuán hosts the Madrid Central Mosque, the oldest and one of the two most important mosques in Madrid along with the M-30 mosque.
