= Damien Megherbi =

French film producer

- Occupation: Producer
- Known for: Wicked Girl; Nefta Football Club

Damien Megherbi is a French producer, best known for producing the animated television series Samuel written and directed by Emilie Tronche, the feature film The Mysterious Gaze of the Flamingo by Diego Céspedes, selected at Un Certain Regard section at the 78th Cannes Film Festival, where it won the section's top prize and Yves Piat's short film Nefta Football Club which received critical acclaim and was nominated for the 2020 Academy Award for Best Live Action Short Film and 2020 César Award for Best Short Film.

== Life and career ==
In 2013 he co-founded the production and distribution company Les Valseurs with Justin Pechberty.

He received the Best Animated Short Film Award at Ottawa International Animation Festival two years in a row (for producing Wicked Girl in 2017 and Guaxuma in 2018).

In March 2019, his short film production Guaxuma received the Best Animated Film Award at SXSW. In May 2019, his live action short production She Runs received the "Leitz Cine Discovery Prize for Short Film" at Cannes' Critics' Week.

In February 2019, his short film production Wicked Girl was awarded with the César for best animated short film.

In September 2019, France Télévisions awarded him together with Justin Pechberty the "Jeune Producteur" €30,000-price. In January 2020, he received an Oscar nomination for the short film Nefta Football Club by Yves Piat. The same month, Nefta Football Club was nominated for a César Award for Best Short Film.

In 2020, his short film production Nefta Football Club was both nominated Academy Award for Best Live Action Short Film and 2020 César Award for Best Short Film.

In 2024, he produced the animated series Samuel.

In 2025, three of his productions where selected at the Cannes film festival : The Mysterious Gaze of the Flamingo at Un Certain regard, where it won the section's top prize, Sleepless City at Critics week, and the documentary Militantroposat Director's Fortnight.

== Filmography ==
=== Live Action ===
- Elephants in the Fog (2026) by Abinash Bikram Shah – producer – premiered at the 2026 Cannes Film Festival
- The Mysterious Gaze of the Flamingo by Diego Céspedes (2025) – producer – premiered at the 2025 Cannes Film Festival
- Sleepless City (2025) by Guillermo Galoe – producer – premiered at the 2025 Cannes Film Festival
- Sem Coraçao (2023) by Nara Normande & Tião – premiered at Venice Orizzonti
- Aunque es de noche (2023) by Guillermo García López (short film) producer – premiered at Cannes Film Festival
- Big Bang (2022) by Carlos Segundo (short film) - premiered at Locarno Film Festival, Pardino d'Oro
- The Melting creatures (2022) by Diego Céspedes (short film) – premiered at Semaine de la critique
- La Muerte de un Perro (2019) by Matìas Ganz – producer – premiered at Tallinn Black Nights Film Festival
- Fendas (2019) by Carlos Segundo – producer – premiered at 2019 Marseille Festival of Documentary Film
- She Runs (2019) by Qiu Yang (short film) – producer – premiered at 2021 Cannes Film Festival
- The Diver (2019) by Michael Leonard & Jamie Helmer (short film) – producer – premiered at Mostra di Venezia
- Nefta Football Club (2018) by Yves Piat (short film) – producer – nominated for the 2020 Academy Award for Best Live Action Short Film
- Meninas Formicida (2017) by João Paulo Miranda Maria (short film) – producer – premiered at Mostra di Venezia

=== Animation ===
- Wicked Girl (Vilaine fille) (2017) by Ayce Kartal (short film) – producer
- Guaxuma (2019) by Nara Normande (short film) – producer
- Samuel (2024) by Émilie Tronche (animated series) – producer

=== Documentary ===
- Militantropos (2025) by Yelizaveta Smith, Alina Horlova and Simon Mozgovyi – producer
- Après Ta Révolte, Ton Vote (2019) by Kiswendsida Parfait Kaboré – producer
- Midnight Ramblers (2017) by Julian Ballester – producer
