= Sleepless City =

- Spanish theatrical release poster
- Spanish: Ciudad sin sueño
- Directed by: Guillermo Galoe
- Written by: Guillermo Galoe; Víctor Alonso-Berbel
- Produced by: Marina García López; Marisa Fernández Armenteros; Manu Calvo; Alex Lafuente; Damien Megherbi; Justin Pechberty; Anne-Dominique Toussaint
- Cinematography: Rui Poças
- Edited by: Victoria Lammers
- Production companies: Sintagma; Buenapinta Media; Encanta Films; BTeam Prods; Ciudad sin sueño la película AIE; Les Valseurs; Tournellovision
- Distributed by: BTeam Pictures (Spain); Pan Distribution (France)
- Release dates: 19 May 2025 (Cannes); 3 September 2025 (France); 21 November 2025 (Spain)
- Countries: Spain; France
- Language: Spanish

Sleepless City (Spanish: Ciudad sin sueño) is a 2025 drama film directed by Guillermo Galoe, and co-written by Galoe and Víctor Alonso-Berbel. A Spanish and French co-production, it was shot and set in the Cañada Real shanty town near Madrid.

The film had its world premiere in the Critics' Week section of the 2025 Cannes Film Festival on 19 May 2025 ahead of its theatrical release in France by Pan Distribution on 3 September 2025 and in Spain on 21 November 2025 by BTeam Pictures.

== Plot ==
The life of 13-year-old Toni is shattered after his family is given an eviction notice and he learns that his friend Said is leaving La Cañada for good.

== Cast ==
- Antonio Fernández Gabarre
- Bilal Sedraoui
- Jesús Fernández Silva
- Luis Bertolo

== Production ==
Sleepless City was produced by Sintagma Films (Marina García López), Buenapinta Media (Marisa Fernández Armenteros), Encanta Films (Manuel Calvo), Bteam Prods (Álex Lafuente), Les Valseurs (Damien Megherbi and Justin Pechberty), and Les Films des Tournelles (Anne-Dominique Toussaint). Rui Poças worked as cinematographer. The film was shot in Cañada Real.

== Release ==
The film had its world premiere at the Critics' Week section of the 2025 Cannes Film Festival on 19 May 2025. It was also programmed at the 73rd San Sebastián International Film Festival and the 70th Valladolid International Film Festival.

Distributed by Pan Distribution, it was released theatrically in France on 3 September 2025.

Sleepless City received a screening in an outdoor cinema set up in the sector 6 of the Cañada Real on 11 October 2025. BTeam Pictures is set to release the film in Spanish theatres on 21 November 2025.

== Reception ==
On the review aggregator website Rotten Tomatoes, 85% of 13 critics' reviews are positive, with an average rating of 7.4/10.

Jonathan Holland of ScreenDaily described the film as "vibrant, melancholy and immersive", otherwise carrying "a universal message about loss, resilience and hope that deserves to open eyes further affield".

Adam Solomons of IndieWire gave Sleepless City a 'B+' rating deeming it to be "an excellent film" while also declaring Toni and Chule's relationship "a provocative insight into an ideological schism at the heart of a community".

The film won the Golden Punt Jury award at the 2025 Cambridge Film Festival.

== Accolades ==
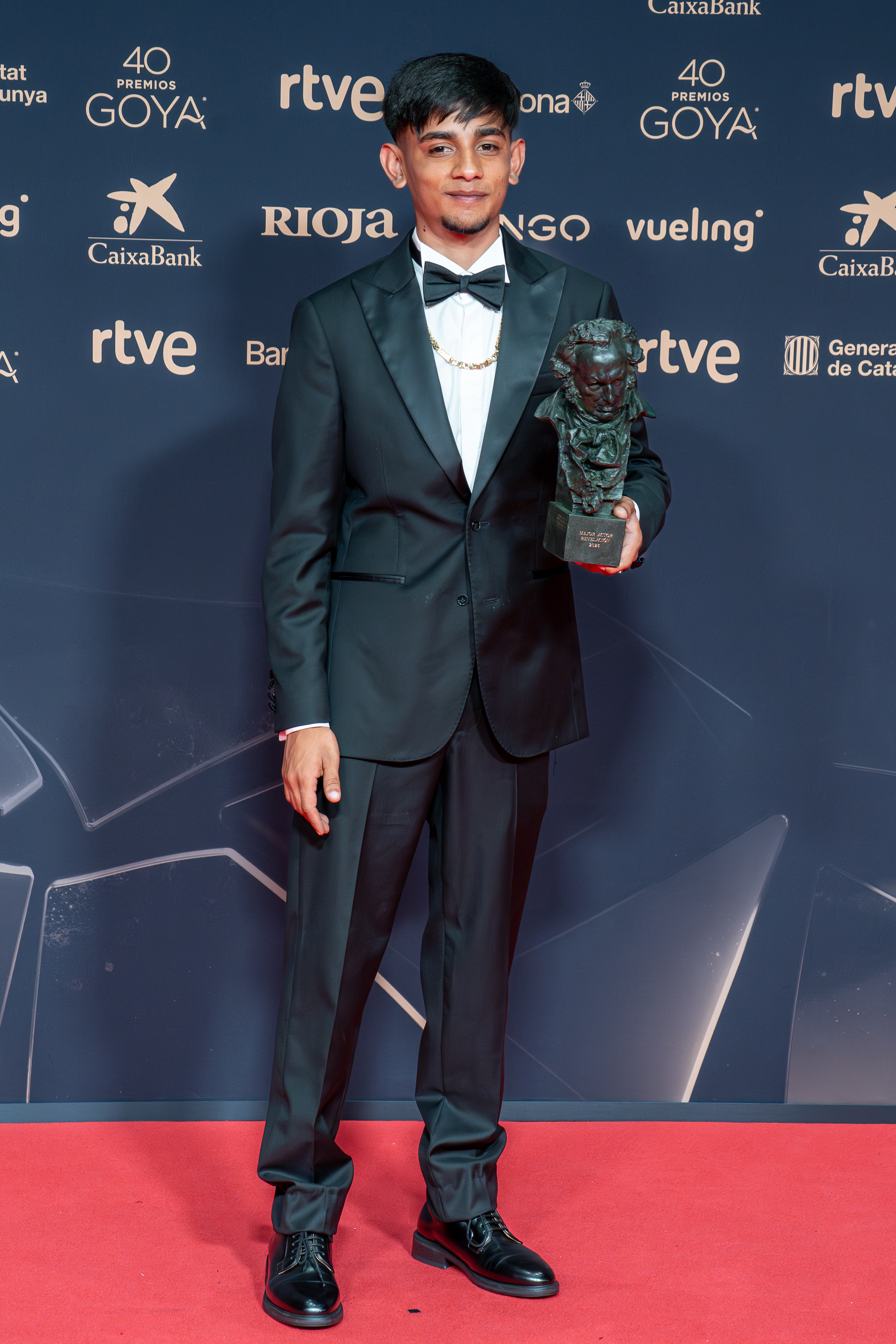
Toni Fernández Gabarre holding his Goya Award for Best New Actor

Year	Award	Category	Nominee(s)	Result	Ref.
2026	40th Goya Awards	Best Adapted Screenplay	Guillermo Galoe, Víctor Alonso-Berbel	Nominated	
2026	40th Goya Awards	Best New Actor	Antonio "Toni" Fernández Gabarre	Won	
2026	40th Goya Awards	Best Cinematography	Rui Poças	Nominated	
2026	40th Goya Awards	Best Production Supervision	Antonello Novellino	Nominated	
2026	40th Goya Awards	Best Editing	Victoria Lammers	Nominated	

== See also ==
- List of Spanish films of 2025
- List of French films of 2025
