= El Cañaveral =

- City neighborhood
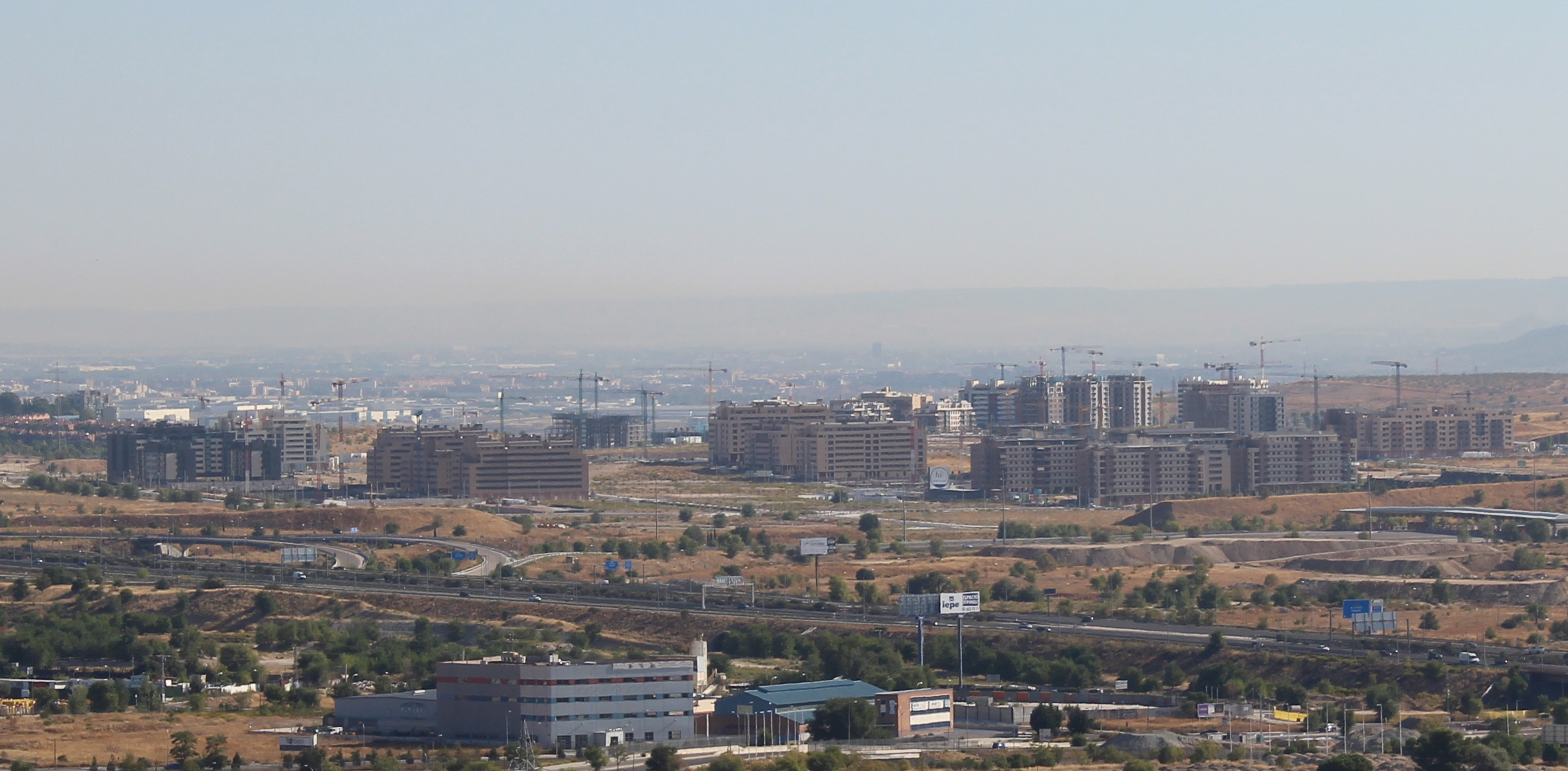
- Interactive map of El Cañaveral
- Country: Spain
- Region: Community of Madrid
- Municipality: Madrid
- District: Vicálvaro

Population (2020)
  - Total: 2,565

El Cañaveral is an administrative neighborhood of Madrid, belonging to the district of Vicálvaro. Created in November 2017 after the passing of the new internal organization of the district on 31 October 2017 by the plenary of the Madrid City Council, it is named after the PAU ("Program of Urban Action") in the area, which unlike the administrative neighborhood does not extend to the east of the Cañada Real linear shanty town, as the administrative neighborhood also currently comprises the future development of Los Cerros, another PAU. The first neighbors of the PAU installed in 2016. As of 1 March 2020, the neighborhood has a population of 2,565.

Once the PAU is fully built it is expected to feature 14,000 housing units. In addition, Los Cerros is tentatively expected to feature 15,000 housing units.

The neighborhood is roughly delimitated by the C-2/C-7 commuter railroads, the R-3, and the municipal borders with Rivas-Vaciamadrid, San Fernando de Henares and Coslada. (Note: "Confluencia a distinto nivel de la vía de ferrocarril de cercanías C2 y C7 y la autopista R-3, autopista R-3 en dirección Sureste y Este hasta la cañada Real de Merinas, cañada Real de Merinas dirección Sur hasta su encuentro con la línea de separación de los términos de Madrid y Rivas-Vaciamiadrid, línea límite municipal en dirección Este, Norte y Oeste con los términos de Rivas-Vaciamadrid, San Fernando de Henares y Coslada, intersección de la línea de separación de municipios de Madrid y Coslada entre los mojones M155 y M156 con la vía del ferrocarril de cercanías C2 y C7, vía ferroviaria de cercanías C2 y C7 dirección Suroeste hasta su confluencia con la autopista R-3.")
