= Les Valseurs =

French production company

- Industry: Film industry
- Founded: 2013; 13 years ago
- Headquarters: Paris, France
- Website: lesvalseurs.com

Les Valseurs is a French film production & distribution company founded in 2013 by Damien Megherbi and Justin Pechberty.

They received the 2019 César Award for Best Animated Short Film for Wicked Girl (2017) by Ayce Kartal and an Oscar nomination for the short film Nefta Football Club by Yves Piat in January 2020. On 21 December 2022, they were shortlisted for the 95th Academy Awards under the category Best Live Action Short Film with Sideral (2021).

== History ==
The company was founded in 2013 by Damien Megherbi and Justin Pechberty in Paris, France.

Beside producing its own content, Les Valseurs also act as a distributor. They released Boris Khlebnijov’s Arrhythmia in 2018, Eugène Green’s Faire la parole in 2017 and Sarah Marx's first feature K Contraire in January 2020.

In February 2018, their animated short production Wicked Girl by Ayce Kartal was awarded at Clermont Ferrand International Short Film Festival the National Grand Prize, becoming the first animated short film to be so since the beginning of the festival. In February 2019, Wicked Girl received the César Award for Best Animated Short Film.

In May 2019, their live action short production She Runs received the "Leitz Cine Discovery Prize for Short Film" at Cannes' Critics' Week.

In September 2019, France Télévisions awarded them the "Jeune Producteur" 30,000€-price.

In January 2020, they received an Oscar nomination for the short film Nefta Football Club by Yves Piat.

== Production ==
=== Live action ===
- Meninas Formicida (2017) by João Paulo Miranda Maria (short film) – premiered at 2017 Mostra di Venezia
- Nefta Football Club (2018) by Yves Piat (short film) – nominated for the 2020 Academy Award for Best Live Action Short Film
- La Muerte de un Perro (2019) by Matìas Ganz – premiered at 2019 Tallinn Black Nights Film Festival
- Fendas (2019) by Carlos Segundo – premiered at 2019 Marseille Festival of Documentary Film
- She Runs (2019) by Qiu Yang (short film) – premiered at 2019 Cannes' Critics' Week
- The Diver (2019) by Michael Leonard & Jamie Helmer (short film) – premiered at 2019 Mostra di Venezia
- Famadihana (2020) by Hugo Rousselin (short film) - premiered at 2020 American French Film Festival
- Electric Bodies (2020) by Antoine Janot (short film) - premiered at 2020 L'Étrange Festival
- Martin fell from a roof (2020) by Matias Ganz (short film) - premiered at 2020 Clermont-Ferrand International Short Film Festival
- Sideral (2021) by Carlos Segundo (short film) - premiered at 2021 Cannes Film Festival
- Big Bang (2022) by Carlos Segundo (short film) - premiered at 2022 Locarno Film Festival, Pardino d'Oro
- The melting creatures (2022) by Diego Céspedes (short film) - premiered at 2022 Semaine de la critique
- Aunque es de noche (2023) by Guillermo García López (short film) - premiered at 2023 Cannes Film Festival
- Sem Coraçao (2023) by Nara Normande & Tião - premiered at 2023 Venice Orizzonti
- The Mysterious Gaze of the Flamingo (2025) by Diego Céspedes – premiered at the 2025 Cannes Film Festival
- Elephants in the Fog (2026) by Abinash Bikram Shah – premiered at the 2026 Cannes Film Festival

=== Animation ===
- Wicked Girl (2017) by Ayce Kartal (short film) – winner of the 2019 César Award for Best Animated Short Film and 2018 Clermont Ferrand International Short Film Festival's National Grand Prize
- Guaxuma (2019) by Nara Normande (short film) – premiered at 2018 TIFF
- Step into the river (2020) by Weijia Ma (short film) -premiered at 2020 Chicago International Film Festival
- I gotta look good for the apocalypse (2021) by Ayce Kartal (short film) - premiered at 2021 Annecy International Animation Film Festival
- Rules of Success (2022) by Théophile Gibaud (shot film) - premiered internationally at 2022 Flicker's Rhode Island
- Animal Tales of Christmas Magic by Camille Alméras, Caroline Attia, Ceylan Beyoglu, Oleysha Shchukina, Haruna Kishi and Natalia Chernysheva - premiered at 2024 Annecy International Film Festival

=== Documentary ===
- Midnight Ramblers (2017) by Julian Ballester – premiered at 2017 This Human World
- Après Ta Révolte, Ton Vote (2019) by Kiswendsida Parfait Kaboré – premiered at 2019 IDFA Amsterdam
- My quarantine bear (2021) by Weijia Ma - premiered at 2021 Visions du réel

== Projects ==
=== Live Action ===
- Nefta by Yves Piat
- Milk Powder by Carlos Segundo
- Ciudad sin sueño by Guillermo García López
- The French Teacher by Ricardo Alves Jr.
- Blackbird by João Paulo Miranda Maria

=== Virtual Reality ===
- Deusa Das Aguas by Joao Paulo Miranda Maria (short film)

=== Animation ===
- Les Décentrés by Marion Boutin & Damien Pelletier (short film)
- The day I smoked a cigarette with my dad by Sameh Alaa & Robin Vouters (short film)

=== Documentary ===
- Los Nombres Propios by Fernando Dominguez
- The Syrians by Ismaël
- Avec Naomie by Dumas Maçon
- Targuia by Leïla Artese Benhadj
