= Émilie Tronche =

French director, screenwriter and presenter

Émilie Tronche (born 28 May 1996) is a French director, screenwriter and presenter. She is known for writing the series Samuel on Arte.

== Biography ==
Émilie Tronche's father works in finance. After her baccalaureate, Tronche joined the school of art and animation of the Sèvres workshop (Atelier de Sèvres) in 2014, before pursuing training in animation at the School of Animation Cinema of Angoulême from 2015 to 2019. In particular, she directed the graduation short film Tour de main.

At the end of school, she participated in the collection of short films entitled "En sortant de l'école" (Leaving School), which gives the opportunity to young people from animation schools to make their first professional short film inspired by a poem of their choice (each year, a new collection is dedicated to a specific author). Thus she made her first short film in real production conditions in 2020, adapting the poem "Promenade sentimentale" by Paul Verlaine.

After 5 months of production on this short film at the L'Incroyable Studio in Nantes (The Incredible Studio), she finished her film ahead of schedule. She took advantage of it by using the studio's equipment to make a lighter short film in 5 days. Thus was born a first film featuring the character of Samuel, a 10-year-old child who tells moments of life in the first person by writing his diary. She put this little film online in June 2020, on Instagram and Facebook, and followed by 3 other episodes that she always directed alone.

Upon discovering this first short film on the Internet, producer Damien Megherbi proposed developing the adventures of Samuel's character for an online series. This is how the Samuel series broadcast by the Arte channel on its arte.tv website from March 8, 2024, and also on its TikTok and Instagram accounts was born. With more than 25 million cumulative views in two months of broadcast, the series is a critical and public success and a generational phenomenon that sees teenagers and young adults filming themselves on TikTok interpreting passages of the series in playback.

In May 2024, on the sidelines of the 77th Cannes Film Festival, Tronche and her producer were awarded the Pierre-Chevalier Prize.

In April 2025, it was announced that Arte Éditions and Casterman would publish the graphic novel, Le journal de Samuel (Samuel's Diary), directed by Tronche, scheduled for May 21, 2025.

== Style ==
The work of Tronche is characterized by a strong interest in the animation of bodies, and in dance scenes in particular. Explaining that she wanted to "be a choreographer when [she was] Samuel's age", she pays particular attention to movements and attitudes, to the point of filming herself as a reference for the drawing of the storyboard of her films.

== Filmography ==
=== As a director ===
==== Short films ====
- 2019: Turn of the hand
- 2020: Sentimental walks

==== Television series ====
- 2024: Samuel

=== As a screenwriter ===
==== Television series ====
- 2024: Samuel

==== Feature films ====
- 2026: Incredible! By Benjamin Massoubre, based on the comic book by Vincent Zabus and Hippolyte (also host)

=== As an actress ===
==== Feature films ====
- 2021: The French Dispatch by Wes Anderson: student/dubing Léa Seydoux

=== Dubbing ===
==== Television series ====
- 2024: Samuel of herself: Samuel and all the other characters in the series

== Bibliography ==
=== Graphic novel ===
- Émilie Tronche, Samuel's journal, Arte Éditions and Casterman, 2025, 320 p

== Distinctions ==
- Lagardère Scholarship 2021 "Animated film author" for the Samuel series
- Pierre Chevalier Award 2024 for the Samuel series
- Écran Total's 2024 Personality of the Year Award
- Blink Blank Award 2024 awarded by Blink Blank, the animated film magazine.
