= Casco Histórico de Vicálvaro =

Coordinates: 40°23′49″N 3°36′54″W

- City neighborhood
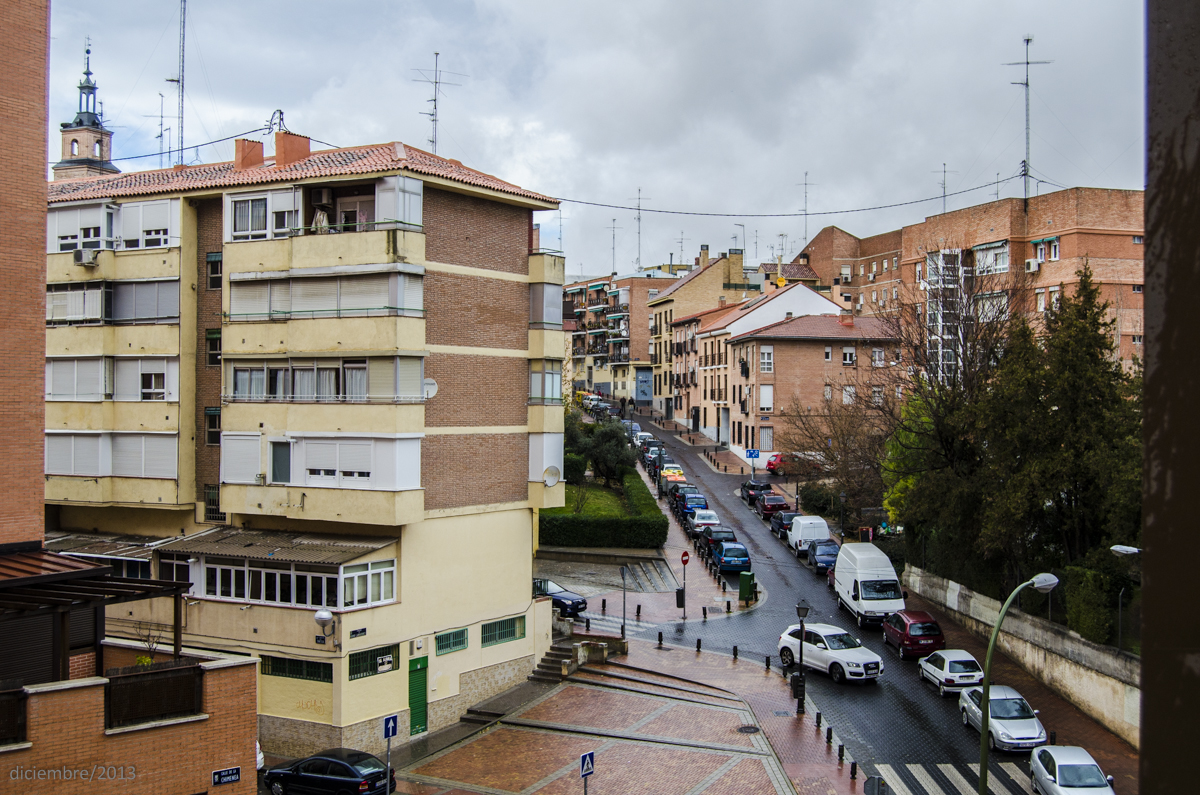

- Country: Spain
- Aut. community: Community of Madrid
- Municipality: Madrid
- District: Vicálvaro

Casco Histórico de Vicálvaro is an administrative neighborhood (barrio) of Madrid belonging to the district of Vicálvaro. It is the largest neighborhood in the district.

As it has been the case since 1988, the name of the neighborhood recognizes the area as including the small urban centre of a municipality (Vicálvaro's) absorbed by Madrid. Under the purview of 31 October 2017 agreement of the Municipal Plenary, the neighborhood of Ambroz was dissolved and its territory became part of the neighborhood of Casco Histórico de Vicálvaro.
