= Ambroz (Madrid) =

Coordinates: 40°25′0″N 3°35′0″W

- Neighborhood
- Country: Spain
- Autonomous community: Madrid
- Municipality: Madrid
- District: Vicálvaro

Ambroz was an administrative neighborhood (barrio) of Madrid belonging to the district of Vicálvaro (one of the district's two constituent neighborhoods together with Casco Histórico). In 2017, through approval of Madrid's city council, the territory became part of the Casco Histórico de Vicálvaro neighborhood.
