= Vicálvaro =

- District of Madrid
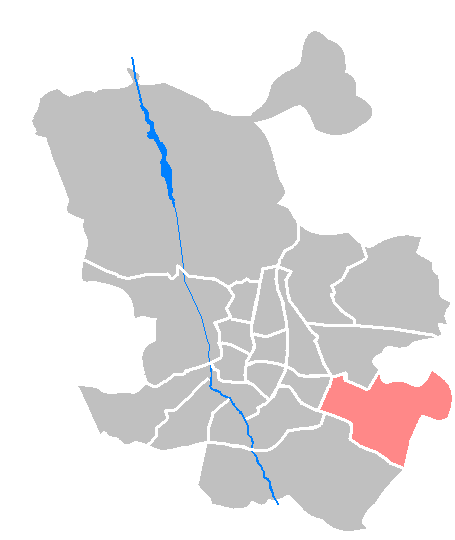
- Coordinates: 40.4042°N 3.60806°W
- Country: Spain
- Aut. community: Madrid
- Municipality: Madrid

Government
  - Councillor-President: Ángel Ramos Sánchez (PP, 2023)

Area
  - Total: 32.71 km^{2} (12.63 sq mi)

Population
  - Total: 70,051
  - Density: 2,142/km^{2} (5,547/sq mi)
- Postal code: 28032
- Madrid district number: 19
- Address of council: Plaza Don Antonio de Andrés
- Website: Munimadrid Vicálvaro

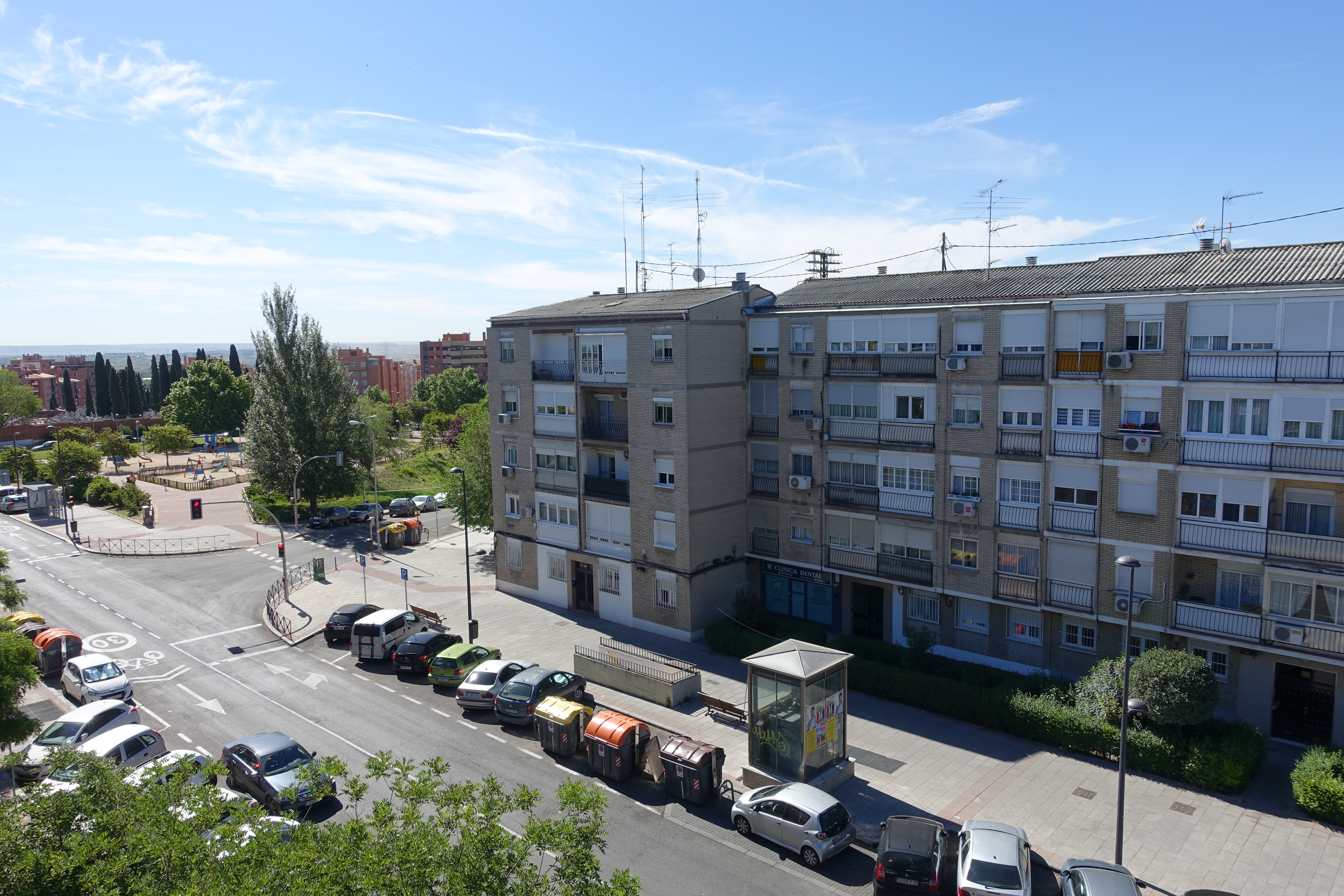
Vicálvaro, May 2019

Vicálvaro [biˈkalβaɾo] is a district in the southeast of Madrid, Spain. It is named after the former municipality absorbed into the municipality of Madrid in 1951.

== History ==
Middle Paleolithic 125,000–40,000 BC: Prehistoric sites have been discovered near the population center of Vicálvaro, specifically in the areas surrounding an ancient brick factory, near the old railway stop, and on Almodóvar hill.

Neolithic: The archaeological works of Casa Montero took place in the months of July and August 2003 where the remains of a stone industry were discovered. More than 2,600 pits of different depths have been located, and based on the pottery shards found, it has been established that they belong to the ancient Neolithic period of the plateau (more than 7,000 years ago).

There are bronze and iron archaeological sites in the vicinity of Almodóvar hill.

The Muslim era: The existence and Arab denomination of the Almodóvar mountain (Muslim military antigua atalaya) as Ambroz, allows the presence of the Muslim population to venture into Moratalaz, Vicálvaro and Vallecas across the various centuries.

The most ancient known document that mentions Vicálvaro dates from 1352 and is in the Vatican Archives. It goes over the payment of the tithe to the church by part of the residents of Vicálvaro.

When Spain's Civil Guard (Spanish: Guardia Civil) was established in 1844, the first headquarters of its cavalry was in Vicálvaro. Franco converted it into an artillery barracks for the Brunete Armored Division, Regiment No. 11. The building is now part of the Rey Juan Carlos University.

Vicálvaro was the site of Leopoldo O'Donnell's 1854 coup known as La Vicalvarada, which began Spain's Bienio progresista.

In 2011, a Visigothic necropolis was uncovered in Vicálvaro.

== Geography ==
=== Position ===
Vicálvaro is bordered on the west by the district of Moratalaz (across the Autopista de Circunvalación M-40), on the north by San Blas (across the M-40, the Avenida de Canillejas a Vicálvaro, the Autopista Radial 3 and the Vicálvaro-Coslada Highway), on the south by the Puente de Vallecas and the Villa de Vallecas (across Autovía A-3) and on the east by the municipalities of Coslada, San Fernando de Henares and Rivas-Vaciamadrid.

=== Subdivision ===
Since 2017, the district is formed by 4 neighborhoods: Casco Histórico de Vicálvaro, Valderrivas, Valdebernardo and El Cañaveral. and the territory became part of the Casco Histórico de Vicálvaro neighborhood. The district formerly comprised only two neighborhoods: Ambroz and Casco Histórico de Vicálvaro (historic Vicálvaro)

The former municipality of Vicálvaro was absorbed into Madrid in 1951. Around its historic center are the nearby neighborhoods (known locally as poblados, colonias or barrios) of San Juan, Mil Viviendas, Las Cruces y Anillo Verde. Several of these cross the boundary between the two official barrios. West of the historic center of Vicálvaro, but entirely within the official barrio of Vicálvaro, is a second center at Valdebernardo, developed in the 1990s.

Finally, since 1998, Valderrivas has been developed on the land of a former cement factory operated 1923–1995 by Cementos Portland Valderrivas. This also falls within the official barrio of Vicálvaro. Portland moved their cement production to Morata de Tajuña because municipal ordinances raised increasing environmental issues. They sold their land, 40 percent of which was granted permits as being suitable for urban development; Portland also took charge of the ensuing construction. In the process, they tore down the chimney that had for decades been emblematic of Vicálvaro. Also in the Valderrivas area is a new neighborhood called La Catalana, near the border with of the Coslada district. La Catalana is mainly commercial.

== Public transport ==
In the late 1990s, an extension of the Line 9 of the Metro Madrid from Pavones to Arganda del Rey was opened to the public, with passengers having to change trains at Puerta de Arganda station in order to continue their journey. Most characteristic for the new stations of Valdebernardo, Vicálvaro, San Cipriano and Puerta de Arganda are their distinctly coloured walls, an innovation aimed at making it less likely for passengers to accidentally miss their stop. Many subsequently constructed or renovated stations of the Metro system now use that same technique.

It is important to distinguish between the Metro Vicálvaro (situated in the centre of the Casco Histórico) and the train station Vicálvaro (situated above the Metro Puerta de Arganda).

== Gallery ==
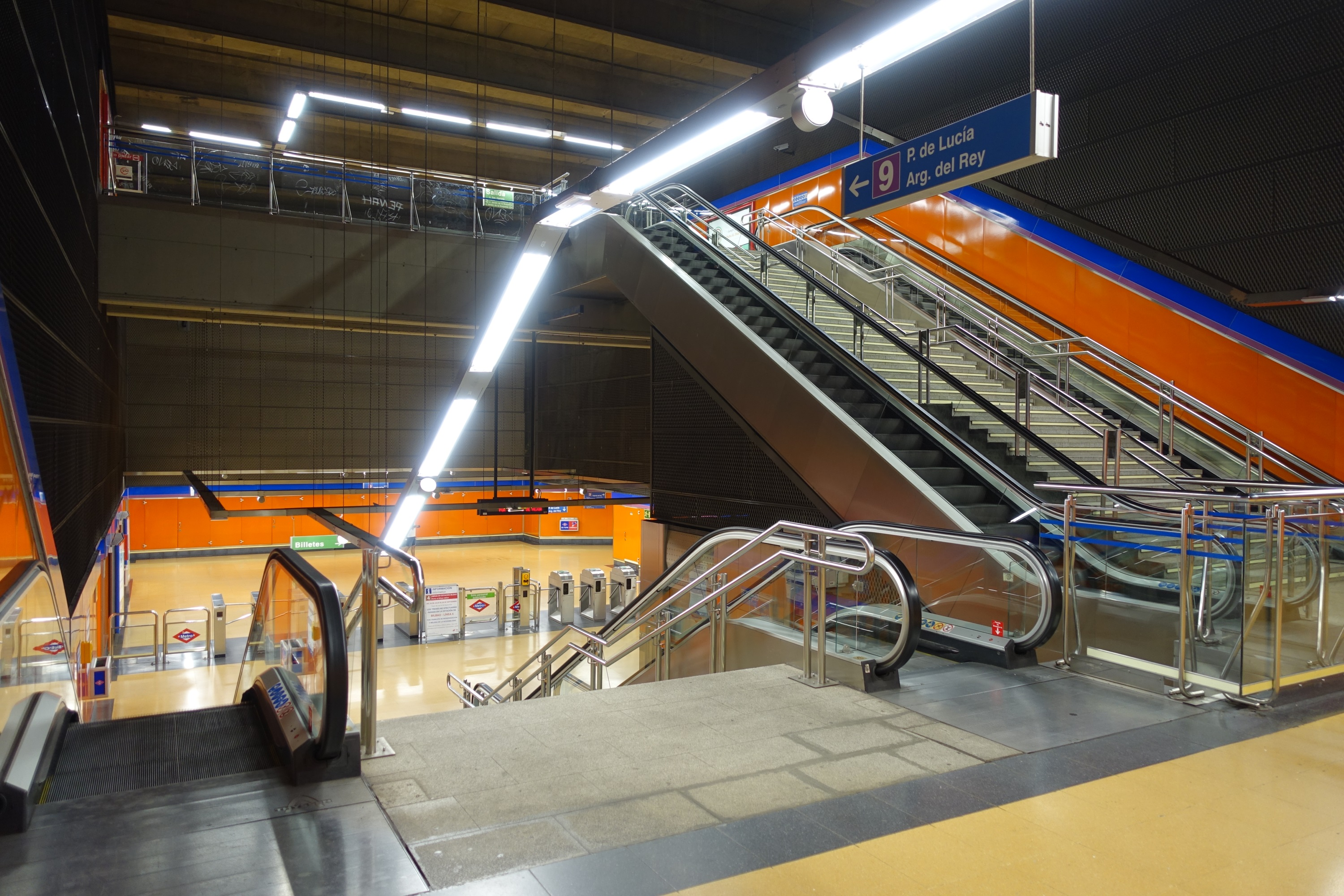
Interior of the San Cipriano metro station.

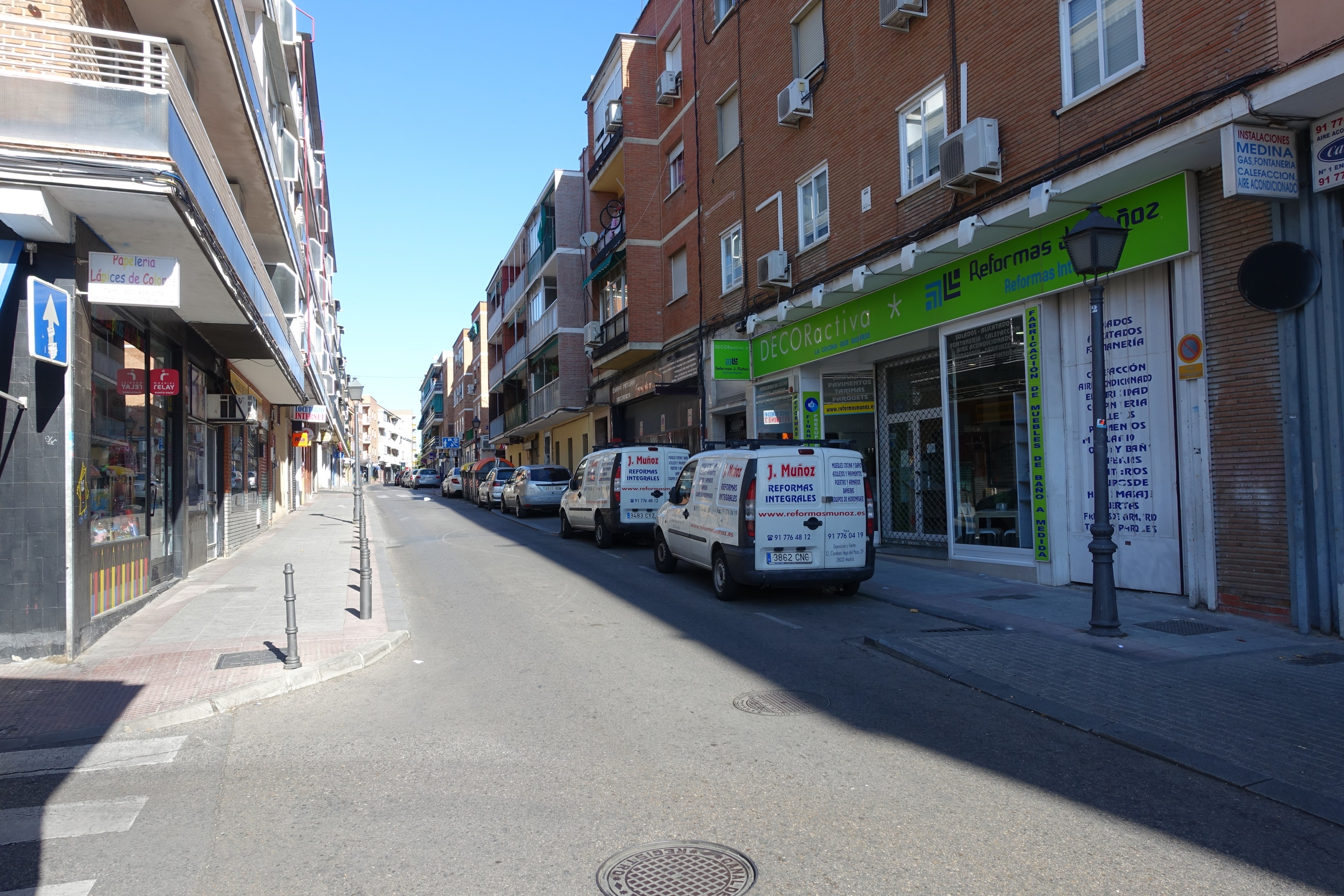
Calle Condeza Vega del Pozo

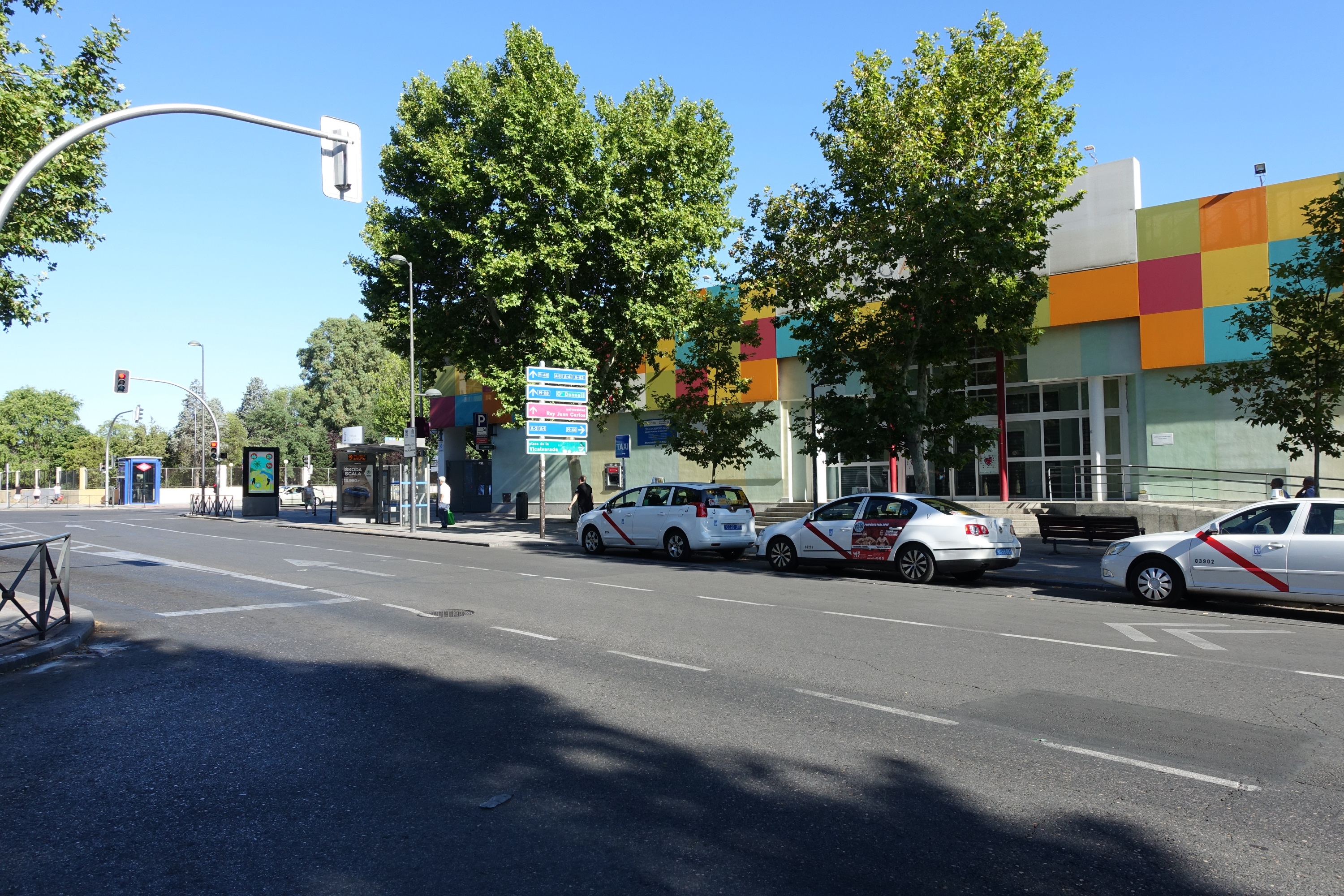
Centro Comercial de Vicálvaro with bus stops

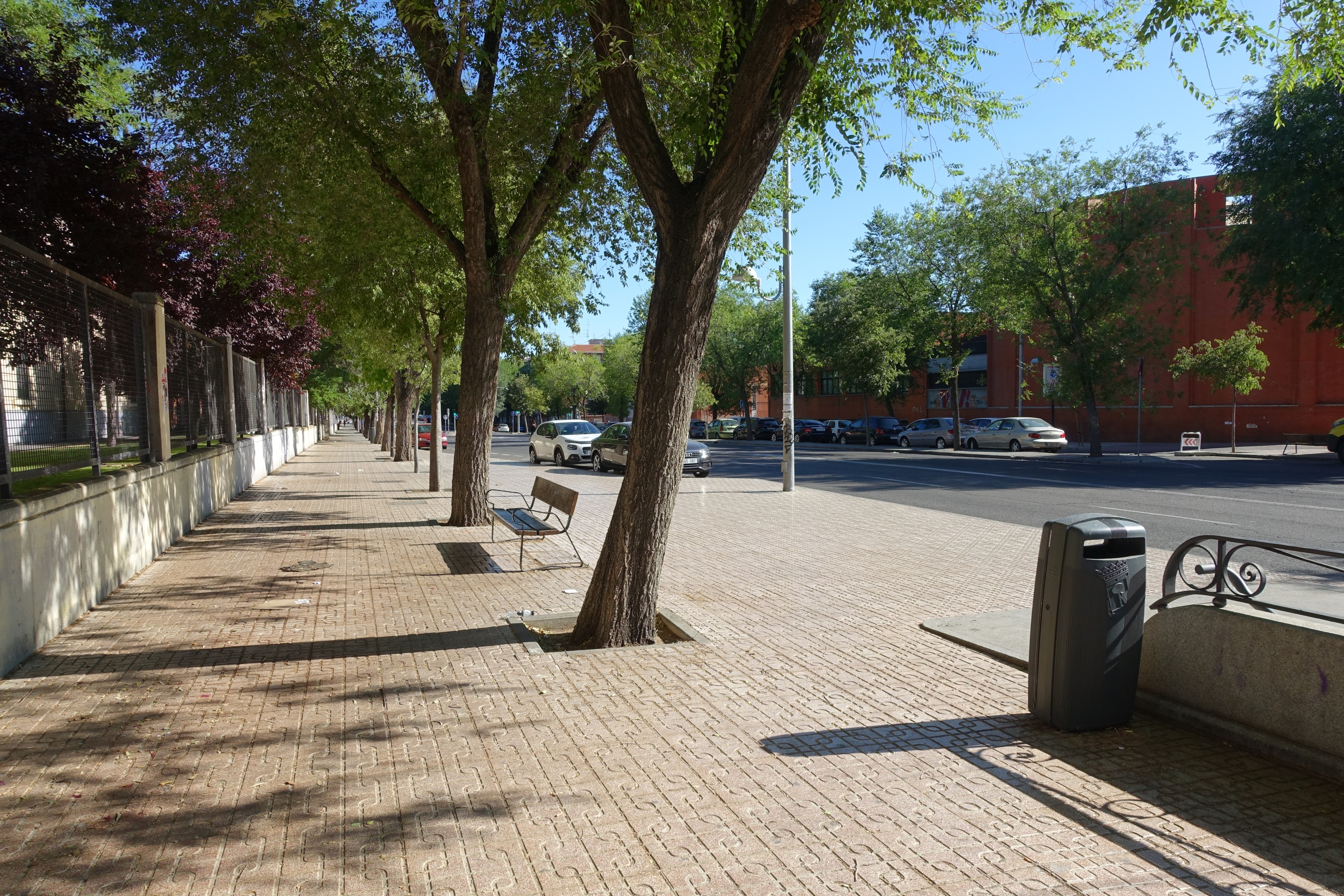
Paseo de los Artilleros

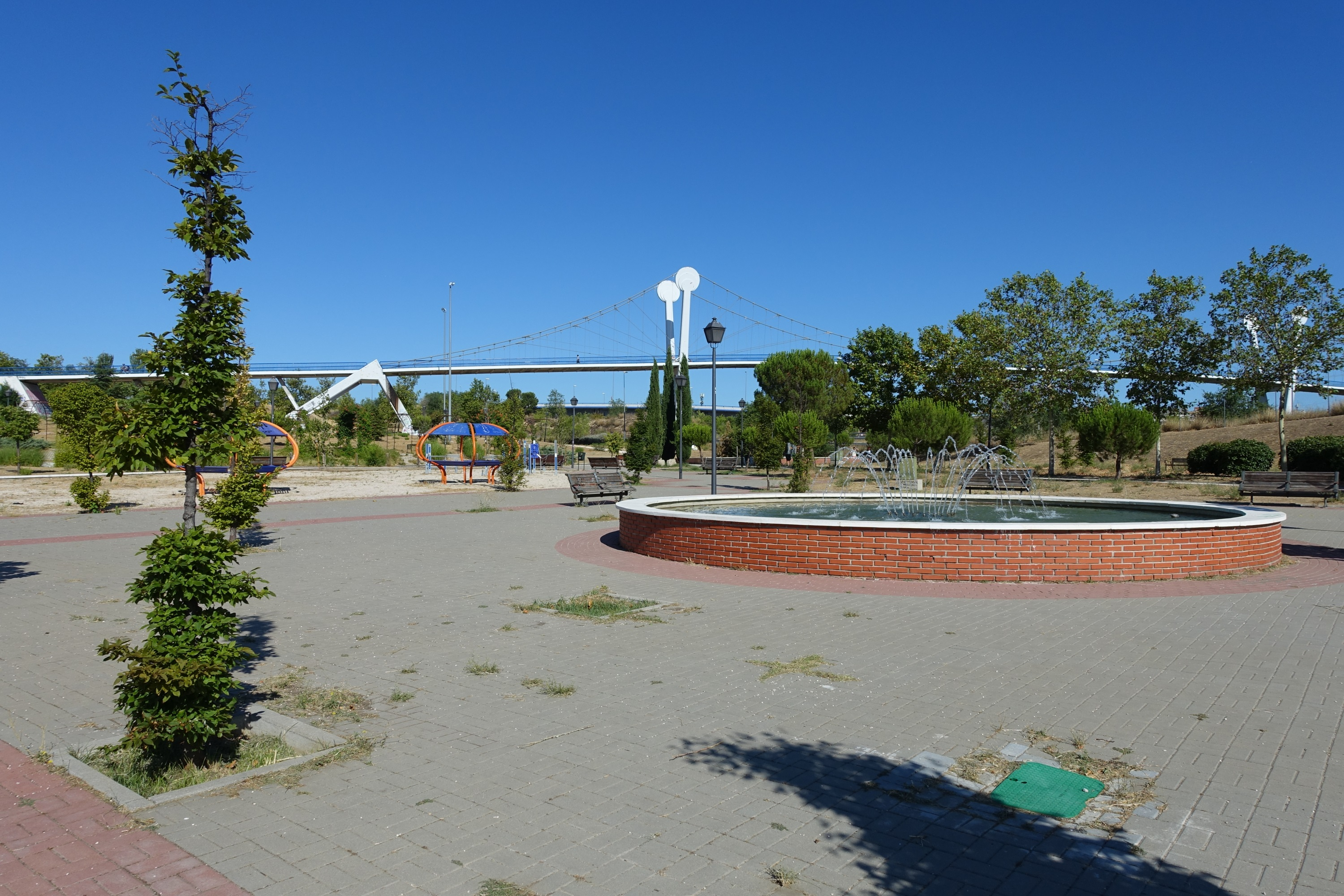
Parque de la Maceta with highway (R3) crossing for bikes and pedestrians

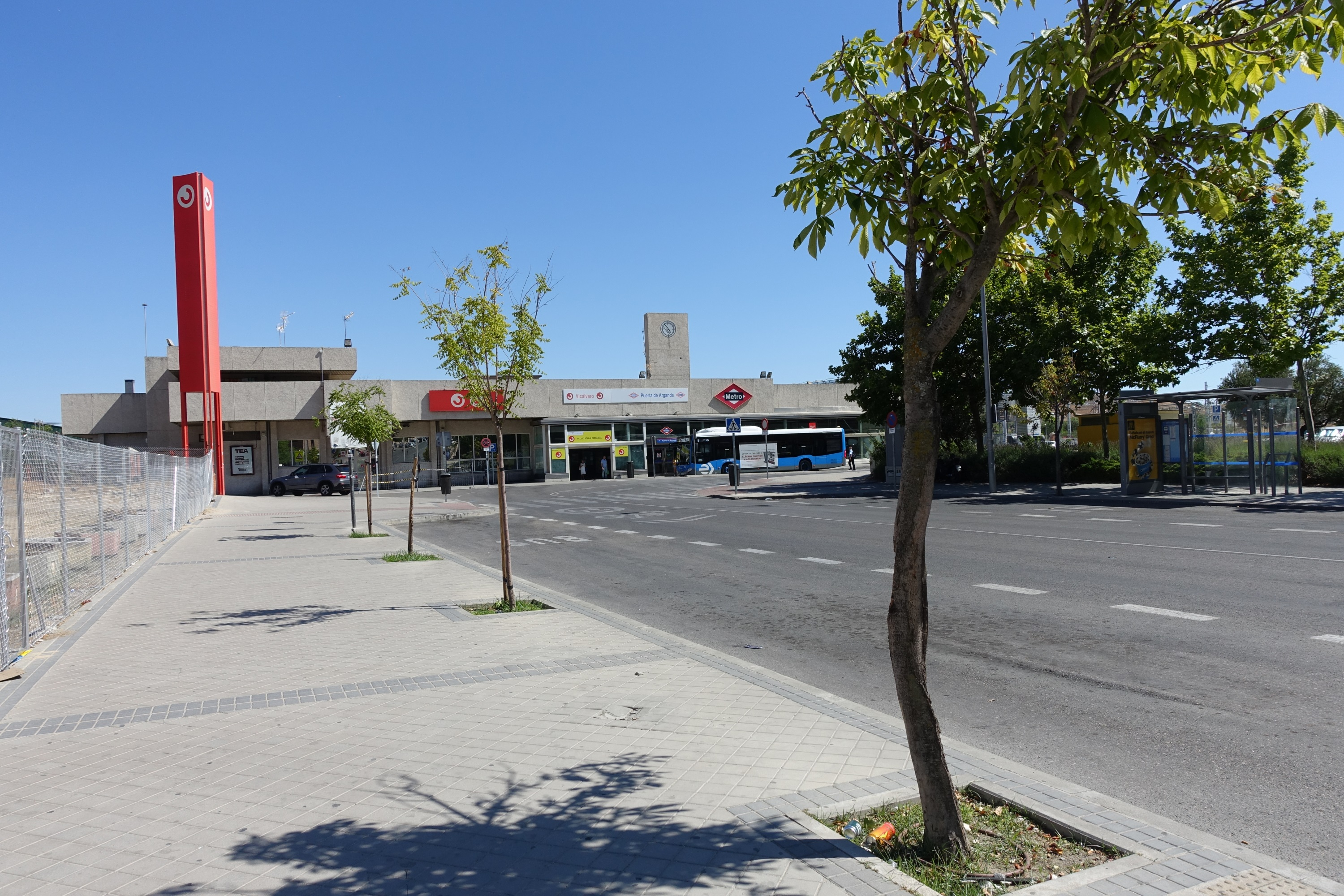
Train station Vicálvaro with access to metro and cercanías

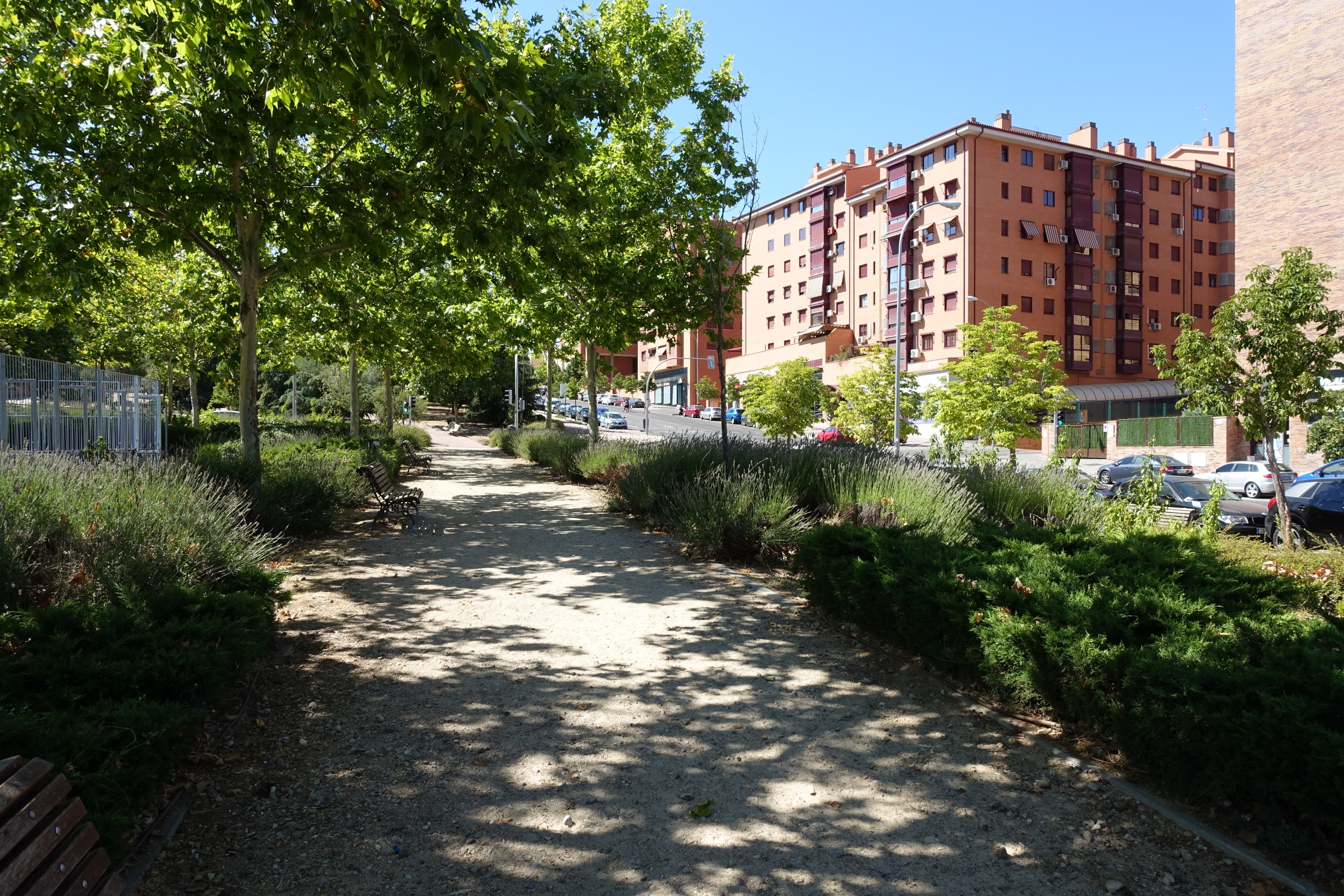
Sidewalk alongside main road
