= Nefta Football Club =

2018 film directed by Yves Piat

- Directed by: Yves Piat
- Written by: Yves Piat
- Produced by: Damien Megherbi; Justin Pechberty
- Starring: Eltayef Dhaoui; Mohamed Ali Ayari; Lyès Salem; Hichem Mesbah
- Cinematography: Valentin Vignet
- Edited by: Jérôme Bréau
- Music by: Jérôme Rossi
- Production company: Les Valseurs
- Release date: October 24, 2018 (Cinemed)
- Running time: 17 minutes
- Countries: France; Tunisia; Algeria
- Language: Arabic
- Box office: $330,661

Nefta Football Club is a 2018 live action short film directed by French director Yves Piat. It has been selected and awarded at several film festivals including Clermont-Ferrand International Short Film Festival, Palm Springs International Film Festival as well as Aspen Shortsfest, where it won the Oscar Qualifying Jury Award for Comedy.

In January 2020 it was nominated for the 2020 Academy Award for Best Live Action Short Film and the 2020 César Award for Best Short Film.

== Plot ==
In a Tunisian village, children are playing football on a wasteland. Meanwhile, Abdallah and Mohammed come across a donkey with headphones on its ears and bags full of white powder on its back. The two young brothers decide to bring those bags back to their village.

== Awards ==
Since its launch, the film has been selected in nearly 100 festivals around the world and has received more than 65 awards.

Year	Presenter/Festival	Award/Category	Status
2018	CINEMED	Audience Award	Won
2019	Clermont-Ferrand International Short Film Festival	Audience Award	Won
2019	Aspen Shortsfest	Jury Award for Comedy & Audience Award	Won
2019	Cleveland International Film Festival	Honorable Mention	Won
2019	Florida Film Festival	Audience Award	Won
2019	Edinburgh International Film Festival	International Competition	Nominated
2019	HollyShorts Film Festival	Best Short Film	Nominated
2019	Leeds International Film Festival	International Competition	Nominated
2019	Rhode Island International Film Festival	International Competition	Nominated
2020	92nd Academy Awards	Best Live Action Short Film	Nominated
2020	45th César Awards	Best Short Film	Nominated
