= Samuel (animated series) =

2024 multi-national animated TV series

- Genre: Animated series
- Created by: Émilie Tronche
- Written by: Émilie Tronche
- Directed by: Émilie Tronche
- Countries of origin: France; Spain
- Original languages: French; Spanish; Catalan
- No. of seasons: 1
- No. of episodes: 21

Production
- Producers: Damien Megherbi; Justin Pechberty; Pablo Jordi
- Running time: 4 minutes

Original release
- Network: Arte France; Clan; SX3
- Release: 11 March 2024

Samuel is an animated television series written and directed by Émilie Tronche. The story explores the transition from childhood to adolescence and psychological maturity through the eyes of Samuel, a ten-year-old boy who records his experiences in a personal diary.

The series consists of a single season with 21 four-minute television episodes, complemented by one-minute episodes for social media. It features a minimalist drawing style in black and white that mimics a childlike stroke. It is a French–Spanish co-production by Les Valseurs and Pikkukala, in collaboration with Arte France, Radiotelevisión Española (RTVE), Televisió de Catalunya (3Cat), and the region of Hauts-de-France.

== Synopsis ==
On his tenth birthday during the 2000s, Samuel receives a diary by a relative as and begins writing about his life, focusing on the end of childhood and the beginning of adolescence, including his relationships with friends, the transition from primary to secondary school, his insecurities, and his first growing feelings for Julie, a classmate he falls for after an encounter on the bus.

Classmate Mabel confesses her feelings for Samuel, and he rejects her. Mabel later asks Samuel if he is in love with Julie and replies with no, along with a comment about her appearance. Mabel then tells the teacher loudly so the class can hear it, including Julie. Dimitri, another classmate, begins dating Julie. Mabel, who struggles with anger and social isolation, finds her only source of happiness in her scented card collection, which classmates later steal. Samuel and his friend Benjamin return their stolen cards and apologize, and they all start to grow together after that.

Following his grandmother's death, Benjamin returns to school outwardly and unaffected. When Samuel challenges him to run down a steep hill, Benjamin's backpack opens mid-run and scatters drawings the class had made for him. He falls, and seeing the drawings again brings him to tears. Samuel gathers the drawings and comforts him.

Julie later ends things with Dimitri without explanation, though he notes their growing distance beforehand. Samuel spots her performing in a dance show his mother is part of, and the two wave at each other at a red light after the show. As summer begins, the town gathers to watch fireworks, and Samuel reflects on Benjamin's comment earlier about the transition to high school. During a family trip to a beach in Miami, Samuel meets another boy who encourages him to confess his feelings to Julie, prompting Samuel to write her a postcard admitting how he feels.

At high school, Samuel, Benjamin, Dimitri, Mabel, and Julie all attend the same school. Samuel makes new friends as well named Steven and Noah. Benjamin is labeled a "disruptive element" after bringing a bird to class, Dimitri gains popularity through his older brother, Mabel joins a new friend group but talks to Samuel after school sometimes, and Julie interacts with him and his friends occasionally. Samuel reveals Julie never responded to his postcard. Mabel later discovers a list Samuel had made of ways to make himself seem more "cool" and he argued with her to give it back. They later reconcile online on MSN and she tells him that he think he's fine just the way he is. Their friendship grows later in another episode after skipping a day of school together.

When Julie finds Samuel's diary and he confesses that he still likes her, she admits she had feelings for him too, and had bought a postcard to reply but she never sent it. She reveals she'll be transferring schools and isn't ready for a relationship now, fearing it would mean losing herself. At a party, Mabel overhears Samuel make a comment related to her at an awkward time. After the party ends on their walk home, Samuel apologizes and she tells him she's always known about his feelings for Julie and kisses him before leaving. After a period of distance, Samuel tells Mabel how he feels and she replies with little at first, before returning to tell him she feels the same.

By the end, Samuel has filled all the pages of his diary, just one day before his eleventh birthday.

== Production ==
Samuel is a series written, directed, and voiced by Émilie Tronche. The production was carried out jointly between France and Spain, handled respectively by the studios Les Valseurs and Pikkukala.

After graduating from the Animation School of Angoulême and making a short film for France Télévisions in 2020, Tronche began posting animations on social media exploring adolescent concerns, which caught the attention of Les Valseurs. In September 2021, it was confirmed that the project would be developed into an animated series commissioned by Arte France.

The Spanish–Finnish studio Pikkukala also joined the production, bringing experience from previous TV series such as My Real Neighbors and Stinky Dog. Public broadcasters RTVE and Televisió de Catalunya (3Cat) also participated in the project. The animation in Samuel is 2D and minimalist, with a quick sketch-like black-and-white line style that, according to the creator, aims to "convey emotion, to say what I wanted with very little," creating an intimate and spontaneous atmosphere. The animation is produced at a rate of twelve drawings per second. Tronche voices all characters in the French version; each episode is narrated from Samuel's point of view, except for one—"The Letters"—which is centered on his friend Berenice. Another key feature of the series is the use of music, with songs that reinforce the message of each episode, and dance as a form of physical expression.

Samuel follows a transmedia storytelling approach aimed at a teenage audience, allowing it to be followed both on linear TV and social media. On one hand, 21 television episodes were created, each four minutes long and in 16:9 format. On the other, a separate version was released consisting of 20 vertical one-minute videos for TikTok and Instagram, which complement the plot and place more emphasis on music. Initially, the series was conceived as a digital-only project, but both RTVE and 3Cat requested a television version to air on their respective channels. The production received funding from the Centre national du cinéma et de l'image animée (CNC) and the Instituto de Crédito Oficial (ICO).

On February 22, 2026, the series creator, Émilie Tronche, confirmed through an Instagram Reel that season two is in development with Arte.

== Release ==
After its official presentation at the Annecy International Animation Film Festival, Samuel premiered in March 2024 on the networks of the three media groups involved in the production: in French on Arte, in Spanish on RTVE—Clan and RTVE Play—, and in Catalan on 3Cat and SX3. In 2025, Netflix acquired the international broadcasting rights for release on February 5, 2026, though some of the character names were changed in the English version.

== Voice cast ==
Émilie Tronche voices all the characters in the original French version. The Spanish and Catalan dubs are both performed by actress Estel Tort, under the direction of Aleix Estadella. The English version is performed by actress Eleanor Noble under the voice direction of Wyatt Bowen.

== Episodes ==
Each episode of Samuel has a runtime of four minutes and is part of a single season consisting of 21 episodes. In addition, 20 one-minute vertical format episodes were produced for social media, complementing the main storyline. The series premiered on 11 March 2024 on Arte, Clan, and SX3.

All episodes are available for free on the video-on-demand platforms and social media channels of Arte (in French and German), RTVE (in Spanish), 3Cat (in Catalan), and Netflix (in English).

=== Episode list ===
1. "Tall Julie"
2. "Sunday"
3. "The Pool"
4. "Beef & Carrots"
5. "The Choir”
6. "The Letters"
7. "The Castle"
8. "The Slope of Death"
9. "The Rain"
10. "The Festival"
11. "The Holidays"
12. "The T-shirt"
13. "The Waves"
14. "Back to School"
15. "Anger"
16. "Snack Time"
17. "The Strike"
18. "The Fever"
19. "Moonlight"
20. "The Little Apartment"
21. "The End"
