= The Mysterious Gaze of the Flamingo =

2025 film by Diego Céspedes

- Chilean theatrical release poster
- Spanish: La misteriosa mirada del flamenco
- Directed by: Diego Céspedes
- Written by: Diego Céspedes
- Produced by: Giancarlo Nasi; Justin Pechberty; Damien Megherbi
- Starring: Tamara Cortés; Matías Catalán; Paula Dinamarca; Pedro Muñoz; Luis Tato Dubó; Vicente Caballero; Bruna Ramírez; Sirena González; Alexa Quijano; Francisco Diaz
- Cinematography: Angello Faccini
- Edited by: Martial Salomon
- Music by: Florencia Di Concilio
- Production companies: Quijote Films; Les Valseurs; Weydemann Bros Films; Irusoin; Wrong Men
- Distributed by: Cinecolor Films (Chile); BTeam Pictures (Spain); Arizona Distribution (France)
- Release dates: 15 May 2025 (Cannes); 16 January 2026 (Spain); 12 March 2026 (Chile)
- Running time: 107 minutes
- Countries: Chile; France; Belgium; Spain; Germany
- Language: Spanish

The Mysterious Gaze of the Flamingo (Spanish: La misteriosa mirada del flamenco) is a 2025 drama film written and directed by Diego Céspedes, in his feature debut. Starring Tamara Cortés, Matías Catalán and Paula Dinamarca, it follows a 12-year-old Lidia as she navigates fear and prejudice when the arrival of AIDS begins to threaten her queer family in a remote mining town in 1980's northern Chile.

The film is a co-production of Chile, France, Belgium, Spain, and Germany. It had its world premiere in the Un Certain Regard section at the 78th Cannes Film Festival on 15 May 2025, where it won the section's top prize. It was selected as the Chilean entry for Best International Feature Film at the 98th Academy Awards, but it was not nominated.

== Plot ==
1982. Eleven-year-old Lidia lives with her beloved queer family in a desert mining town in northern Chile. As an unknown and deadly disease begins to spread, legend has it that it is transmitted through a simple glance, when two people fall in love. While people are accusing her family, Lidia must find out whether this myth is real or not.

== Cast ==
- Tamara Cortés as Lidia
- Matías Catalán as Flamingo
- Paula Dinamarca as Mama Boa
- Pedro Muñoz as Yovani
- Luis Dubó as Clemente
- Vicente Caballero as Julio
- Bruna Ramírez as Lioness
- Sirena González as Star
- Alexa Quijano as Eagle
- Francisco Diaz as Piranha

== Production ==
In 2019, Diego Céspedes participated in Cannes' Cinéfondation Residence to develop the film. In 2020, the project participated at the Ikusmira Berriak, held during the San Sebastián International Film Festival. It won the TFL Production Award at the 2020 TorinoFilmLab and received €50,000 production grant. In 2021, it also participated at the Producers Summit of the Sundance Institute. In November 2021, it was reported that French production company Les Valseurs would co-produce the film. It was selected to participate at the 2022 Venice's Gap-Financing Market. In November 2023, it received a €139,000 production grant from Eurimages. In May 2024, it was reported that German production company Weydemann Bros Films would co-produce the film. In April 2025, it was announced that Charades had acquired the film's international sales rights.

Principal photography began on 20 May 2024.

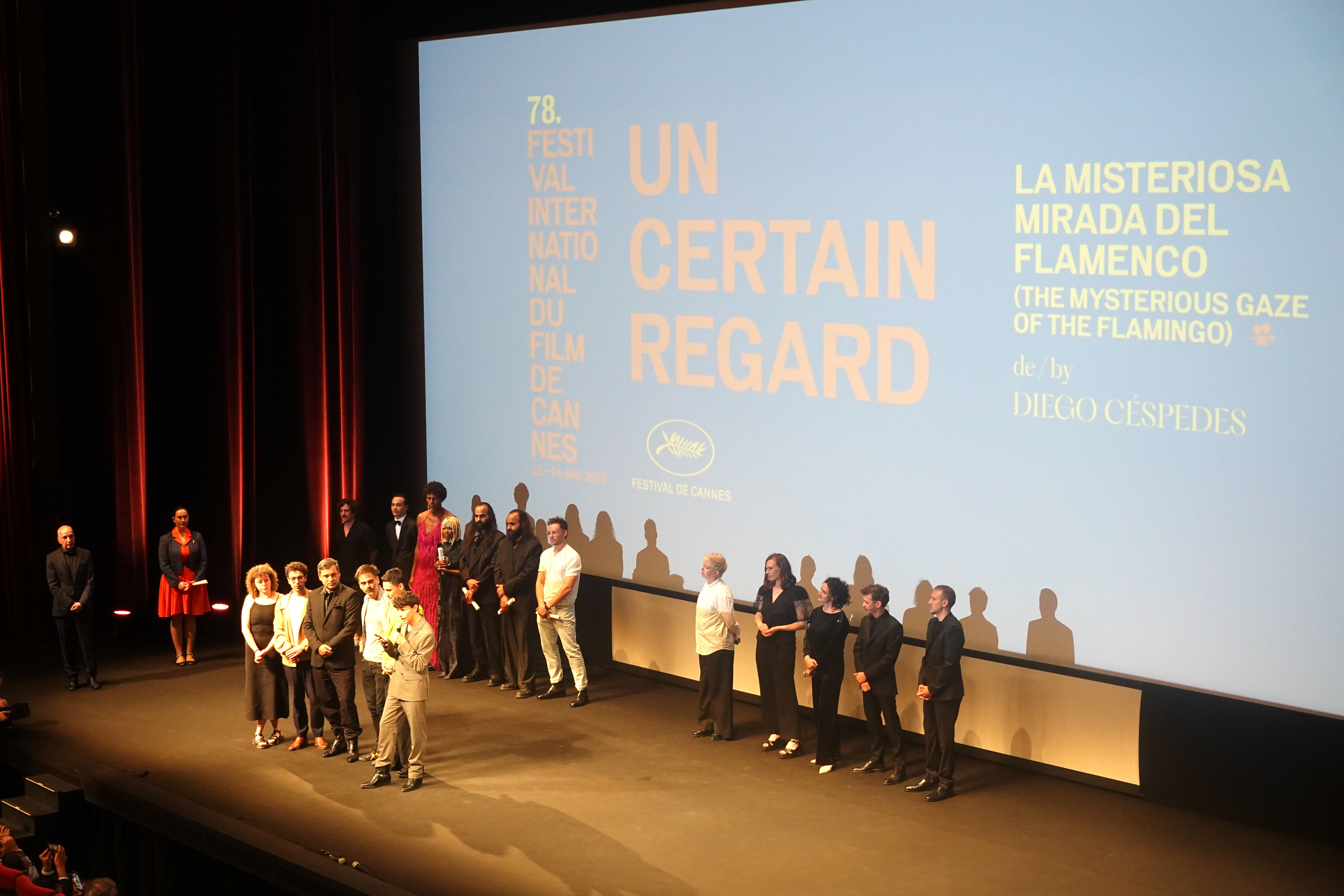
Cast and crew receiving the Un Certain Regard main prize

== Release ==
The Mysterious Gaze of the Flamingo had its world premiere at the Un Certain Regard section of the 2025 Cannes Film Festival on 15 May 2025.

It was released theatrically in Spain by BTeam Pictures on 16 January 2026, and in Chilean theaters on 12 March, by Cinecolor Films.

It was made available to rent via Letterboxd Video Store in the United States on 10 December 2025.

== Reception ==
=== Critical reception ===
On the review aggregator website Rotten Tomatoes, 95% of 44 critics' reviews are positive. The website's consensus reads: "The Mysterious Gaze of the Flamingo uses rich magical realism and vividly realized characters to poetically explore queer resistance, found family, and the power of empathy over fear." On Metacritic, the film has a weighted average score of 77 out of 100 based on 10 critics, which the site labels as "generally favorable" reviews.

=== Accolades ===
Award / Festival	Date of ceremony	Category	Recipient(s)	Result	Ref.
Cannes Film Festival	24 May 2025	Un Certain Regard Award	Diego Céspedes	Won	
Cannes Film Festival	24 May 2025	Queer Palm	Diego Céspedes	Nominated	
Cannes Film Festival	24 May 2025	Camera d'Or	Diego Céspedes	Nominated	
Lima Film Festival	16 September 2025	Trophy Spondylus	The Mysterious Gaze of the Flamingo	Nominated	
Lima Film Festival	16 September 2025	Special Jury Prize - Honorable Mention	The Mysterious Gaze of the Flamingo	Won	
Lima Film Festival	16 September 2025	Best Debut Film	The Mysterious Gaze of the Flamingo	Won	
San Sebastián International Film Festival	27 September 2025	Horizontes Latinos	The Mysterious Gaze of the Flamingo	Nominated	
San Sebastián International Film Festival	27 September 2025	Dama Youth Award	The Mysterious Gaze of the Flamingo	Won	
Forqué Awards	13 December 2025	Best Latin-American Film	The Mysterious Gaze of the Flamingo	Nominated	
Goya Awards	28 February 2026	Best Ibero-American Film	The Mysterious Gaze of the Flamingo	Nominated	
Ariel Awards	3 October 2026	Best Ibero-American Film	The Mysterious Gaze of the Flamingo	Pending	

== See also ==
- List of submissions to the 98th Academy Awards for Best International Feature Film
- List of Chilean submissions for the Academy Award for Best International Feature Film
