= R-3 motorway (Spain) =

Road in Spain

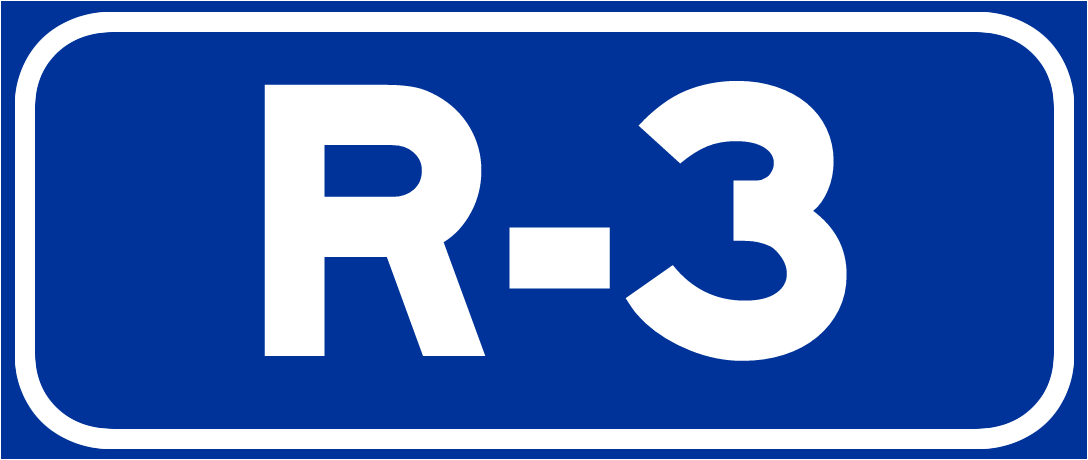
Autopista Radial R-3

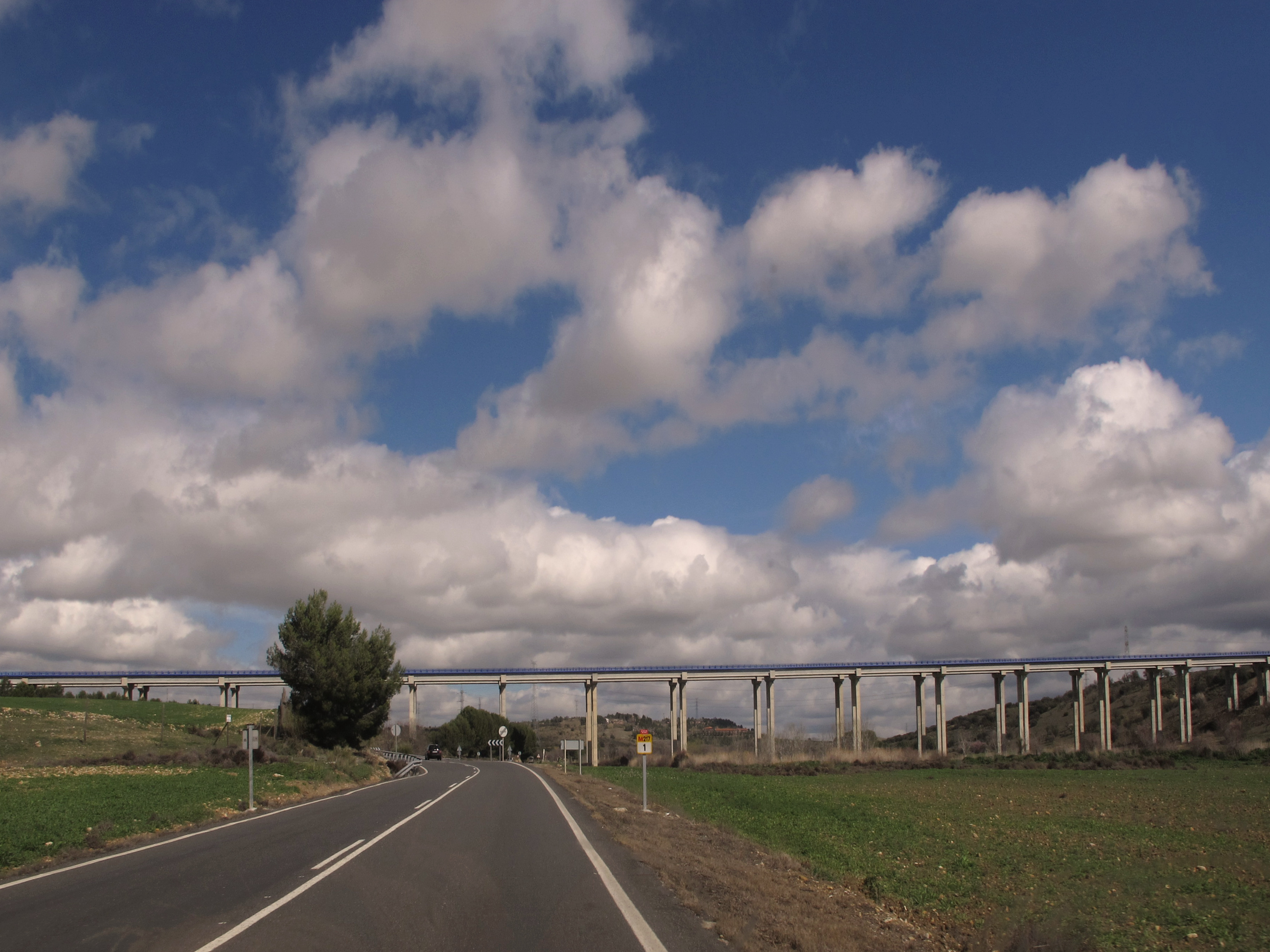

Major junctions
- From: Madrid
- To: Tarancón

Location
- Country: Spain

Highway system
- Highways in Spain; Autopistas and autovías; National Roads

The R-3 motorway (Autopista Radial R-3) is a Spanish motorway connecting Madrid (M-30), Arganda del Rey (A-3) and Tarancón (A-3).
