= Cañada Real =

Informal housing area in Madrid, Spain

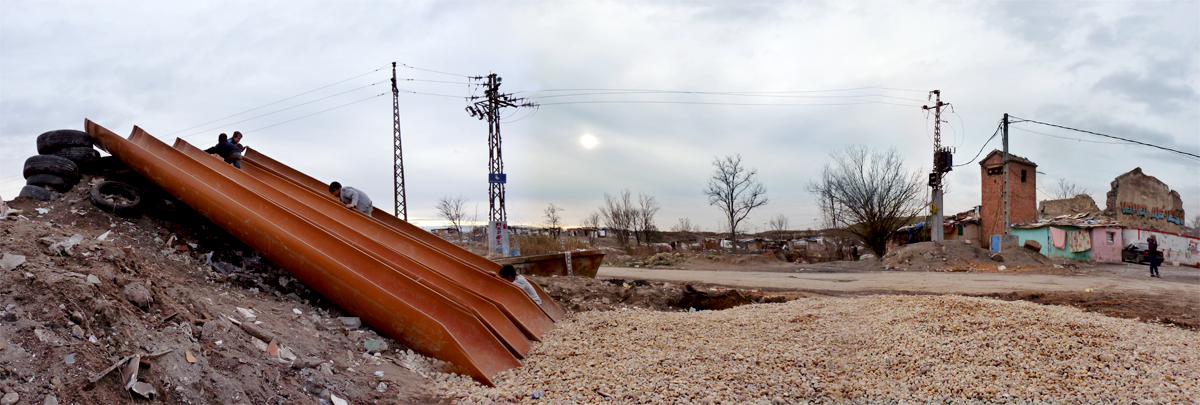

Cañada Real is a shanty town in the Madrid Region of Spain, a linear succession of informal housing following a 14.4-kilometre-long (8.9-mile) stretch of the drovers' road connecting La Rioja and Ciudad Real. The largest illegal settlement in a European city, it extends through the municipalities of Coslada, Rivas-Vaciamadrid and Madrid.

== Location ==
Cañada Real is situated on the Cañada Real Galiana, one of the traditional cattle roads running from La Rioja to Ciudad Real and close to the M50 motorway, Madrid's third outer ring road. The irregular settlement features both high-end detached houses as well as pockets of extreme poverty. The initial settlement, started in the 1950s and 1960s, was built on what currently forms part of the Coslada urban centre; many of the residents later bought the land from the state. It is considered the largest illegal settlement in a European city.

The Cañada Real is divided into 6 subsectors: the Sector 1 (the first 0.52-kilometre; 570-yard long stretch in Coslada on the Camino de Santiago, ending at the limit with Madrid at the M-45), the Sector 2 (1.8 kilometres; 1.1 miles long; between the M-45 and the M-203), the Sector 3 (0.73 kilometres; 800 yards long; between the M-203 and the M-823), the Sector 4 (2 kilometres; 1 1/4 miles long; between the M-823 and the Camino de la Partija y Santísimo), the Sector 5 (1.45 kilometres (1,590 yards) long; between the Camino de la Partija y Santísimo and the A-3) and the Sector 6 (6.7 kilometres; 4¼ miles long; the last stretch in Madrid, going from the A-3 to the municipal border with Getafe). The Sector 6 is considered a "supermarket" for drug users.

== Population ==
With around 8,048 inhabitants and 2,650 houses as of 2012, the Cañada Real was considered at the time to be the largest shanty town in Southern Europe. The population is mixed. It mostly houses both Spanish Romani and irregular migrants (mainly from Morocco). As of 2017, it had a population of 7,283.

== Crime ==
Valdemingómez, a quarter in the centre of Cañada Real, is controlled by drug gangs, and is scarred by violence. Drug users from around Madrid frequent this quarter to visit the drug markets.

== See also ==
- Squatting in Spain
