= Yves Piat =

French writer and filmmaker

- Born: France
- Occupation(s): Writer, director
- Years active: 2001–present

Yves Piat is a French writer and filmmaker, best known for his short film Nefta Football Club for which he received critical acclaim and was nominated for the 2020 Academy Award for Best Live Action Short Film and 2020 César Award for Best Short Film.

== Biography ==
Yves Piat was born in Tourcoing (Nord). First interested in animation films, he took classes of Applied Arts in Brest before joining Joël Tasset's animated films studio in Gouesnou (French Brittany).

He currently lives in Nantes.

== Career ==
In 2001 he directed his first short movie Tempus Fugit.

In 2018 his third short movie Nefta Football Club received critical acclaims and in January 2020 he was nominated for the 2020 Academy Award for Best Live Action Short Film.

== Filmography ==
- Tempus Fugit (2001) : writer, director (short film)
- The Last Moonwalk (2016) : writer, director (short film)
- Nefta Football Club (2018) : writer, director (short film)
