= Diego Céspedes (director) =

Chilean filmmaker (born 1995)

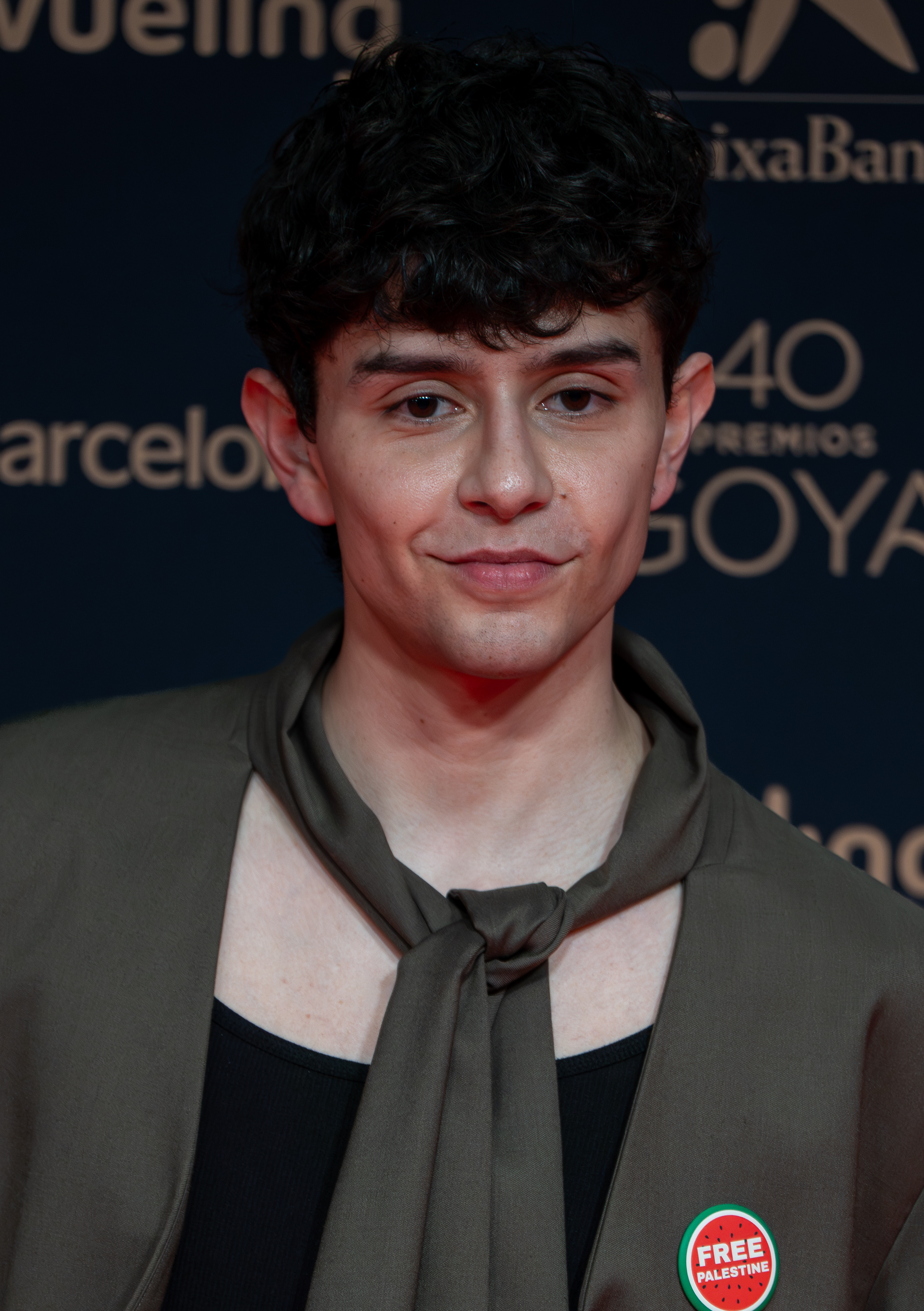
- Céspedes at the 2026 Goya Awards
- Born: 1995 (age 30–31); Santiago, Chile
- Education: University of Chile
- Occupations: Director; screenwriter; cinematographer
- Years active: 2016–present

Diego Céspedes (Spanish pronunciation: [ˈdjeɡo ˈsespedes]; born 1995) is a Chilean film director and screenwriter. His debut feature film, The Mysterious Gaze of the Flamingo, won the Un Certain Regard competition of the 2025 Cannes Film Festival.

== Early life ==
Céspedes was born in Santiago and grew up in a working class family from Peñalolén. His father is a school bus driver and his mother is a homemaker. He received a scholarship to study film and television at the University of Chile, from which he graduated in 2018. While a student, he met director Alicia Scherson and worked as her assistant for three years.

== Career ==
Céspedes's directorial debut, a short titled The Summer of the Electric Lion, won the Cinéfondation prize at the 2018 Cannes Film Festival. He went on to write and direct a second short film titled The Melting Creatures, which premiered in the Critics' Week section of the 2022 Cannes Film Festival.

His debut feature film, The Mysterious Gaze of the Flamingo, won the Un Certain Regard competition of the 2025 Cannes Film Festival. The film was later selected as the Chilean entry for Best International Feature Film at the 98th Academy Awards and received a nomination for Best Ibero-American Film at the 40th Goya Awards.

In May 2026, he was announced as a jury member for the main competition of the 79th Cannes Film Festival.

== Filmography ==
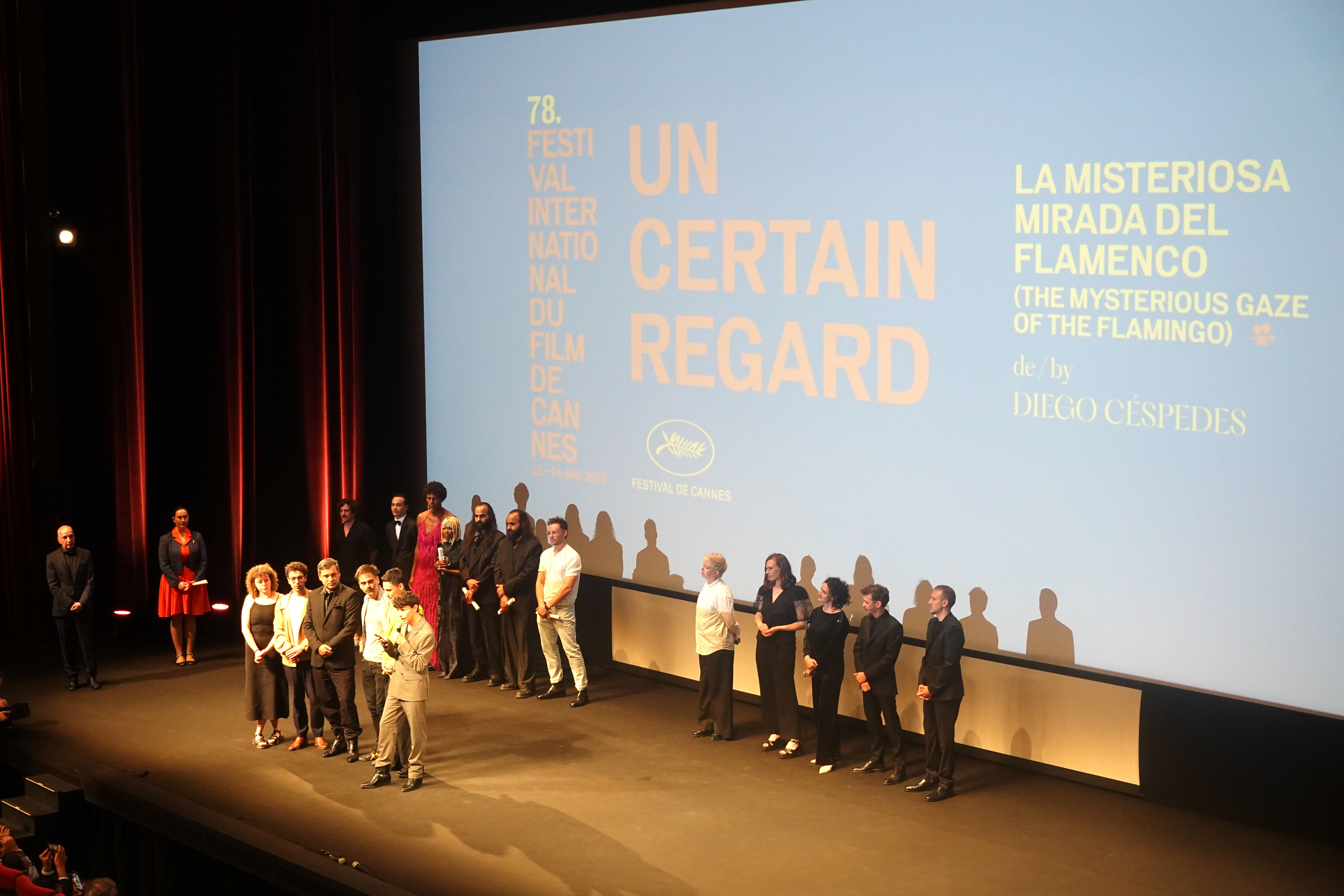
Céspedes and the cast of The Mysterious Gaze of the Flamingo accepting the Un Certain Regard prize at the 2025 Cannes Film Festival

Year	Title	Director	Writer	Cinematographer	Notes	Ref.
2016	Non Castus	No	No	Yes	Short film	
2018	The Summer of the Electric Lion	Yes	Yes	No	Short film	
2022	The Melting Creatures	Yes	Yes	No	Short film	
2025	The Mysterious Gaze of the Flamingo	Yes	Yes	No		

== Awards and nominations ==
Award	Year	Category	Nominated work	Result	Ref.
Brussels International Film Festival	2025	Grand Prix	The Mysterious Gaze of the Flamingo	Won	
Brussels International Film Festival	2025	FIPRESCI Prize	The Mysterious Gaze of the Flamingo	Won	
Cinéfondation	2018	First Jury Prize	The Summer of the Electric Lion	Won	
Cannes Film Festival	2025	Prix Un Certain Regard	The Mysterious Gaze of the Flamingo	Won	
Cannes Film Festival	2025	Caméra d'Or	The Mysterious Gaze of the Flamingo	Nominated	
Cannes Film Festival	2025	Queer Palm	The Mysterious Gaze of the Flamingo	Nominated	
Lima Film Festival	2025	Special Mention	The Mysterious Gaze of the Flamingo	Won	
Lima Film Festival	2025	Best First Feature Film	The Mysterious Gaze of the Flamingo	Won	
QCinema International Film Festival	2025	Best LGBT Film	The Mysterious Gaze of the Flamingo	Won	
San Sebastián International Film Festival	2025	Latin Horizons Best Film	The Mysterious Gaze of the Flamingo	Nominated	
San Sebastián International Film Festival	2025	DAMA Youth Award	The Mysterious Gaze of the Flamingo	Won	
Sundance Film Festival	2019	Short Film Grand Jury Prize	The Summer of the Electric Lion	Nominated	
Toronto International Film Festival	2022	IMDbPro Short Cuts Award	The Melting Creatures	Nominated	
