= Ríos Rosas (Madrid Metro) =

Madrid Metro station

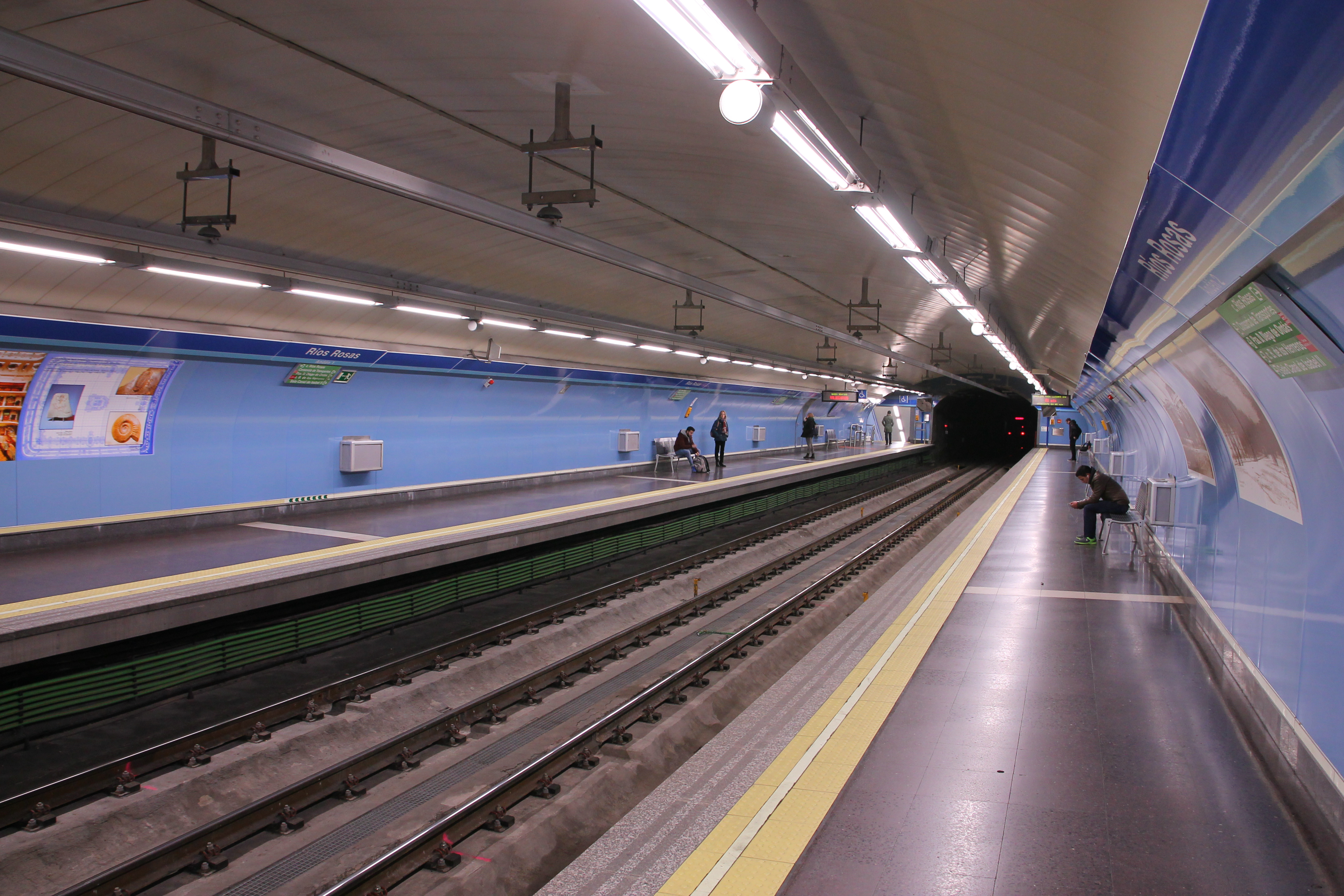

General information
- Location: Chamberí, Madrid; Spain
- Coordinates: 40.4419664°N 3.7012714°W
- System: Madrid Metro station
- Owner: CRTM
- Operator: CRTM

Construction
- Structure type: Underground
- Accessible: No

Other information
- Fare zone: A

History
- Opened: 17 October 1919; 106 years ago

Services
Preceding station	Madrid Metro	Following station
Cuatro Caminos towards Pinar de Chamartín	Line 1	Iglesia towards Valdecarros
Location
- Location within Madrid

Ríos Rosas [ˈri.os ˈro.sas] is a station on Line 1 of the Madrid Metro. It serves the Ríos Rosas ward of the city.

== History ==
The station opened on 17 October 1919 and was one of the original eight stations on the network.
