= Tribunal (Madrid Metro) =

Madrid Metro station

- Platforms of the station of the line 1

General information
- Location: Centro, Madrid; Spain
- Coordinates: 40.426187°N 3.7011027°W
- System: Madrid Metro station
- Owner: CRTM
- Operator: CRTM

Construction
- Structure type: Underground
- Accessible: Yes

Other information
- Fare zone: A

History
- Opened: 17 October 1919; 107 years ago

Services
Preceding station	Madrid Metro	Following station
Bilbao towards Pinar de Chamartín	Line 1	Gran Vía towards Valdecarros
Alonso Martínez towards Hospital Infanta Sofía	Line 10	Plaza de España towards Puerta del Sur
Location
- Location within Madrid

Line 10 southbound platform

Tribunal [tɾiβuˈnal] is a station on Line 1 and Line 10 of the Madrid Metro. Originally opened under the name Hospicio, it has been operating since 1919. It is located in Zone A.

== History ==
The station opened on 17 October 1919 and was one of the first 8 stations on the network. Its original name came from the Real Hospicio de San Fernando, located on Calle Fuencarral near the metro's entrance. It was later renamed Tribunal, after the Tribunal de Cuentas, also located on Calle Fuencarral near the metro's entrance.

The Line 10 platforms opened on 18 December 1981 as part of the Carabanchel–Chamartín de la Rosa suburbano railway then operated by FEVE, which shortly afterwards was transferred to the Community of Madrid.
