= Sol (Madrid Metro) =

Madrid Metro station

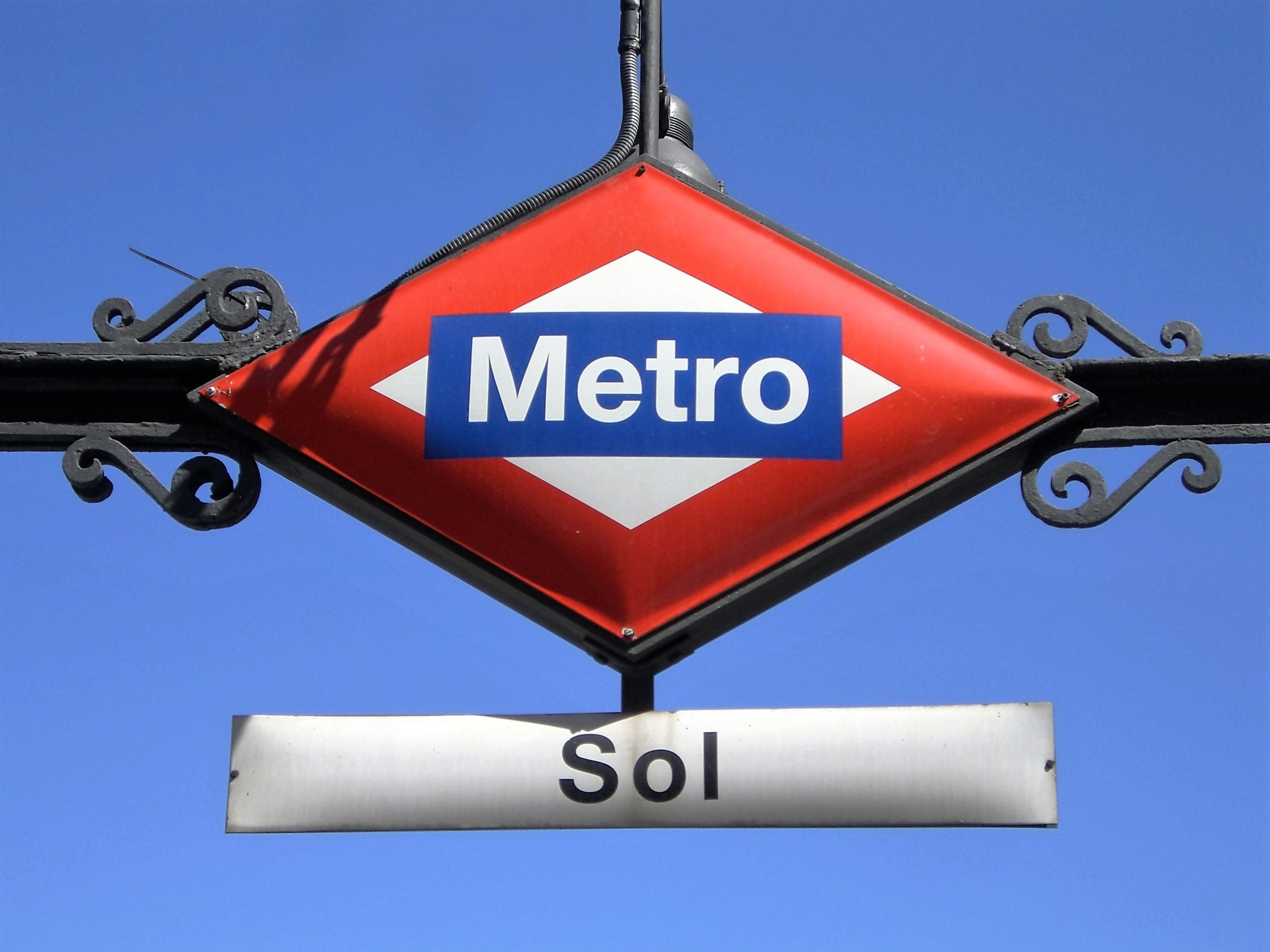

General information
- Location: Centro, Madrid; Spain
- Coordinates: 40.4167635°N 3.7036371°W
- System: Madrid Metro station
- Owner: CRTM
- Operator: CRTM

Construction
- Structure type: Underground
- Accessible: Yes

Other information
- Fare zone: A

History
- Opened: 17 October 1919; 106 years ago

Services
Preceding station	Madrid Metro	Following station
Gran Vía towards Pinar de Chamartín	Line 1	Tirso de Molina towards Valdecarros
Sevilla towards Las Rosas	Line 2	Ópera towards Cuatro Caminos
Lavapiés towards El Casar	Line 3	Callao towards Moncloa
Out of system interchange
Preceding station	Cercanías Madrid	Following station
Nuevos Ministerios towards Chamartín	C-3	Atocha towards Aranjuez
Nuevos Ministerios towards Alcobendas-San Sebastián de los Reyes or Colmenar Viejo	C-4	Atocha towards Parla
Preceding station	Madrid Metro	Following station
Chueca towards Alameda de Osuna	Line 5 transfer at Gran Vía	Callao towards Casa de Campo
Location
- Location within Madrid

Sol [ˈsol] is a station on Line 1, Line 2 and Line 3 of the Madrid Metro. It is located in Zone A and is the most central station on the Metro, located at the Puerta del Sol square. Because of its location, it is one of the busiest stations of the Madrid Metro.

== History ==
=== Madrid Metro ===
Line 1 station became operational in 1919 with the opening of the first section of the Madrid Metro between Sol and Cuatro Caminos. The station of Line 2 was opened in 1924, it was built above the Line 1 station and perpendicular to it. The station of Line 3 was opened in 1936, located roughly at the same level as the Line 1 station and perpendicular to the Line 2. The first sections of the first three lines opened included Sol station.

In the 1960s platforms on the Line 1 were enlarged from 60 to 90 m, but bad condition of the foundations of the surface buildings prevented doing that on both platforms in parallel. So one of the platforms was expanded to the north and another one to the south, resulting in the only Madrid Metro station with non-parallel platforms.

Between 2004 and 2006, Line 3 platforms were also extended from 60 to 90 m, this time they are completely parallel. At the same time elevators installation began, that allowed access to lines 2 and 3 and from the street to the lobby since 2007, The last one that was missing (which gives access to platform 2 of Line 1) was inaugurated in 2016, with the completion of the works on the line carried out between July and November.

The station has four entrances, which, given the large influx of passengers, often causes crowds at the entrance and exit stairs. The interior stands out for its large central room with a decorated ceiling, where there are various shops and a police station.

On July 3, 2016, the platforms of Line 1 were closed for improvement works on the facilities of Line 1 between the stations of Plaza de Castilla and Sierra de Guadalupe. The line was reopened on 13 November 2016, although on September 14 the Plaza de Castilla-Cuatro Caminos and Alto del Arenal-Sierra de Guadalupe sections were reopened. The opening of the Atocha Renfe-Alto del Arenal section was also brought forward.

Parallel to these works, necessary work was carried out to install the missing elevator in the station that communicates with platform 2 of line 1. These works began in February 2016, to achieve full accessibility of the station. The elevator connects the main lobby with the aforementioned platform and its inauguration was in November 2016, coinciding with the end of the improvement works on Line 1.

Between April 24 and May 13, 2019, the platforms of Line 2 remained closed to the public due to an incident on the line.

==== Sponsorships ====
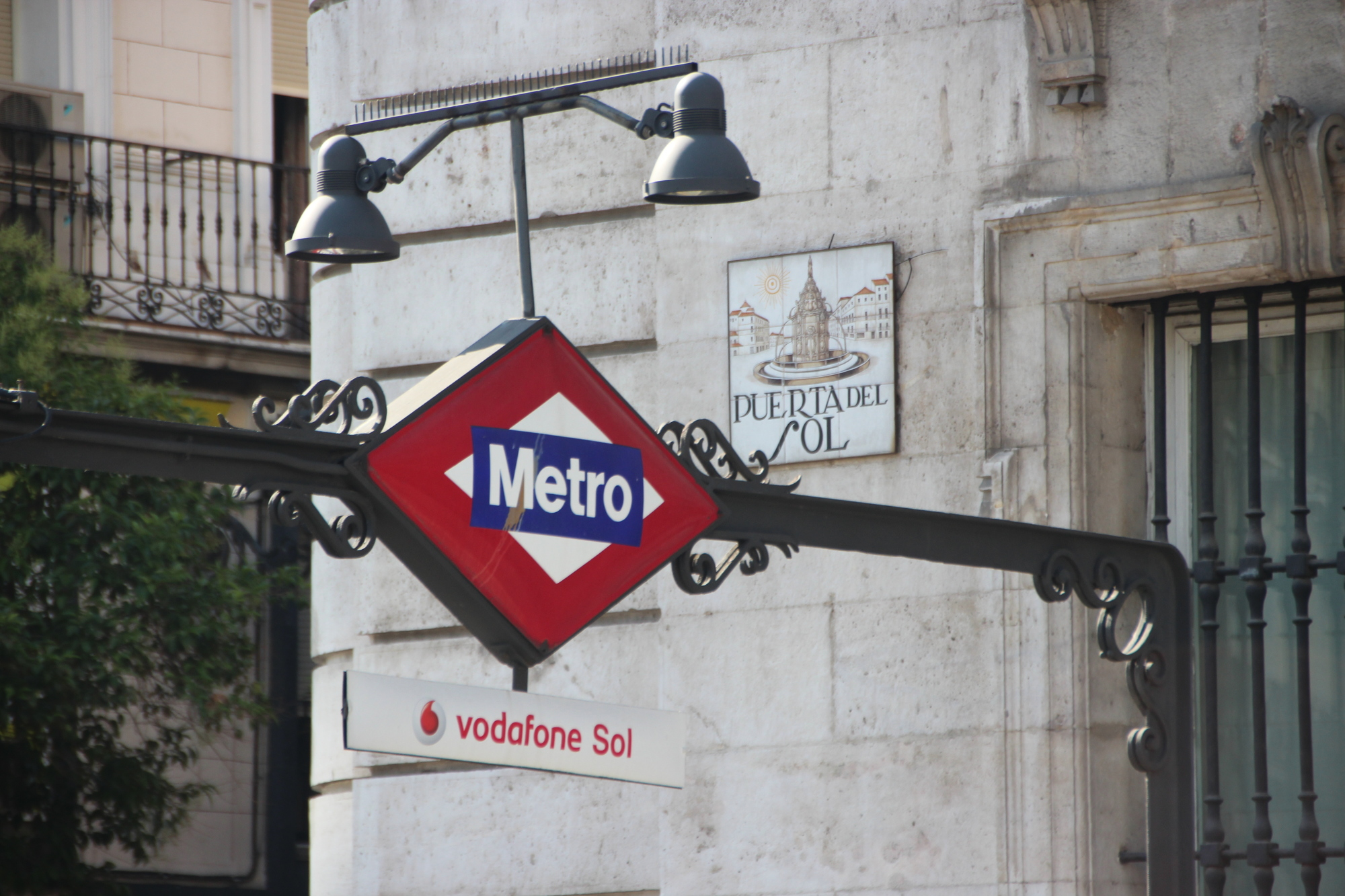
The station was renamed 'vodafone Sol' from 2013 to 2016.

At present, the station has four entrances, which, given the large number of travelers, often causes crowds on the stairs. Its interior features a wide central room with decorated ceiling, where are several shops and a police station.

On 13 March 2012 Sol station was renamed as "Sol Galaxy Note" for a 1-month contract sponsorship by the company Samsung advertising its mobile device. It was a pilot project of naming rights sale to finance public transportation. From 1 June 2013 to 31 May 2016, for sponsorship reasons, the Line 2 station was renamed "Vodafone Sol".

=== Cercanías ===
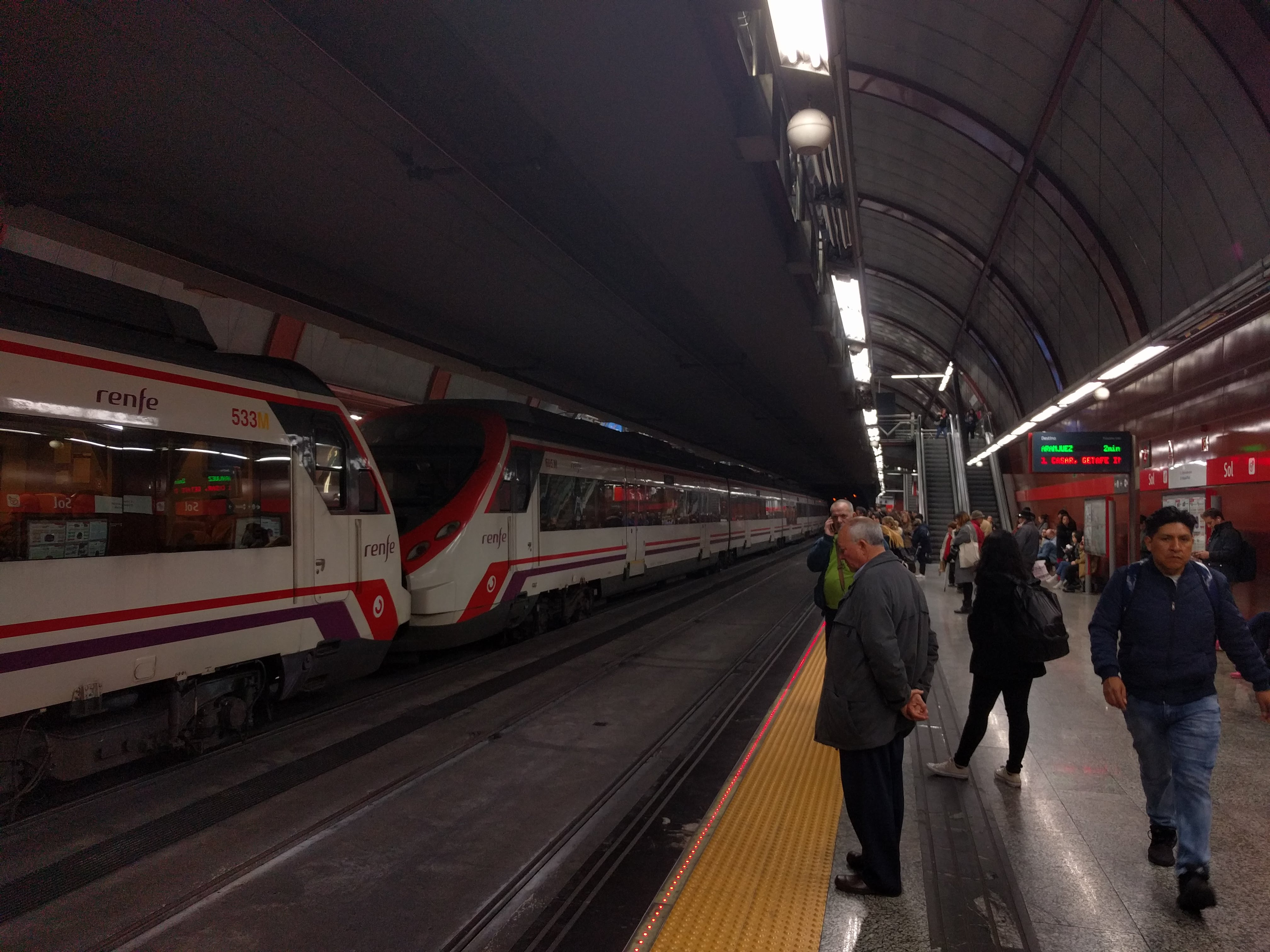
Cercanías platforms at Sol

In 2004 work began to connect the station to the Cercanías Madrid network, via the Atocha-Chamartín tunnel, an alternative to the previously built one. This tunnel was opened to the public on 9 July 2008 and the station opened on 27 June 2009. The works suffered a 6-month break in 2006 due to discovery of archaeological remains and work on the entire tunnel project was considerably delayed. From 25 June to 23 July 2008 Line 2 was temporarily interrupted to allow the construction of the Cercanías station nearby. Line 1 service was also interrupted from August to 4 September 2008.

On July 16, 2021, the new entrance and exit corridors to the Gran Vía station were opened, linking metro Line 5 with the Cercanías de Sol station, making the Cercanías station connected to most metro lines.
