= Estación del Arte (Madrid Metro) =

Madrid Metro station

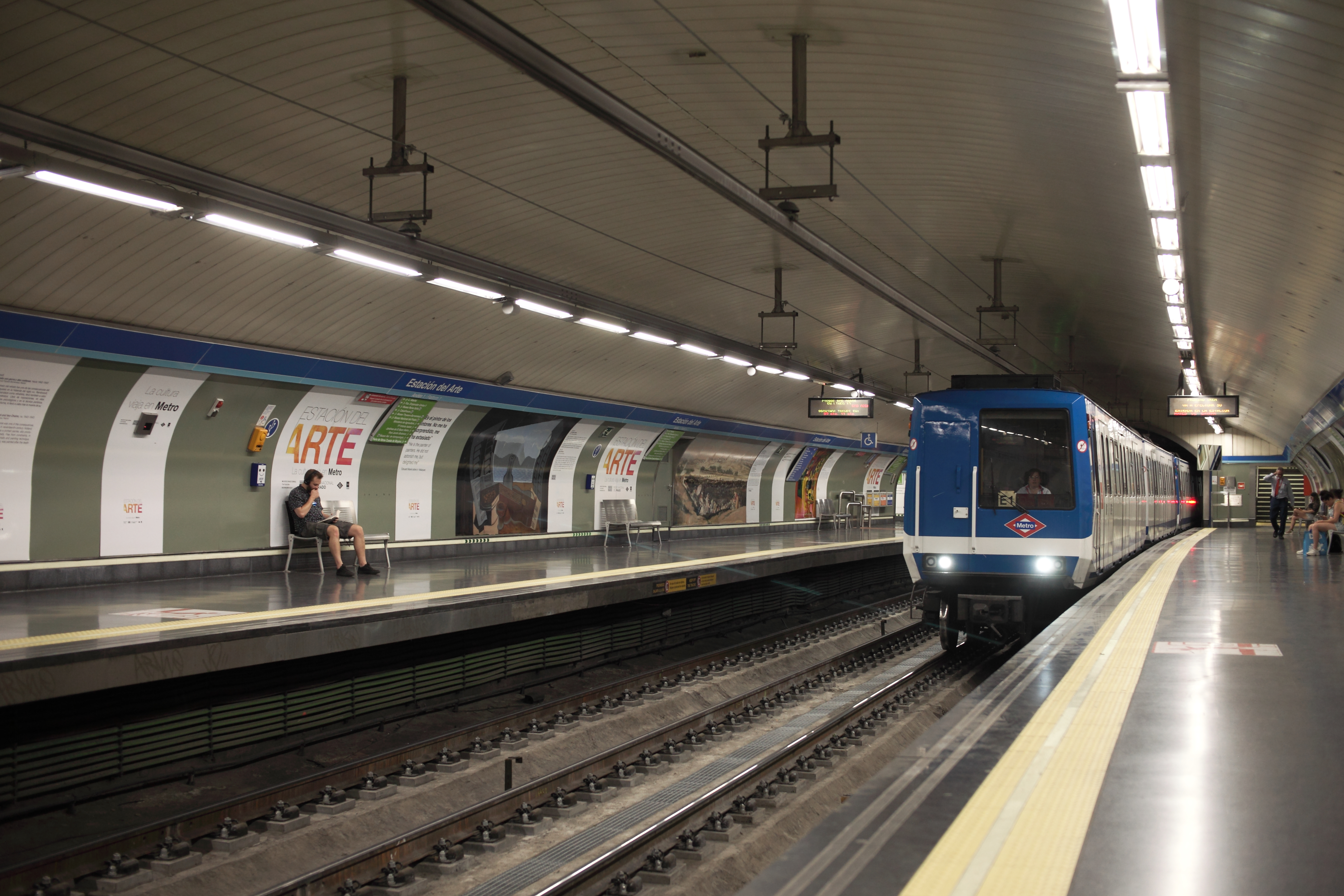

General information
- Location: Centro / Retiro, Madrid; Spain
- Coordinates: 40.4088513°N 3.6924845°W
- System: Madrid Metro station
- Owner: CRTM
- Operator: CRTM

Construction
- Structure type: Underground
- Accessible: No

Other information
- Fare zone: A

History
- Opened: 26 December 1921; 104 years ago

Services
Preceding station	Madrid Metro	Following station
Antón Martín towards Pinar de Chamartín	Line 1	Atocha towards Valdecarros
Location
- Location within Madrid

Estación del Arte ([estaˈθjon del ˈaɾte], "Station of Art") is a station on Line 1 of the Madrid Metro and is located in Fare Zone A. It was opened to the public on 26 December 1926. The station is located beneath Charles V plaza, less than 500 meters from the Madrid Atocha railway station which serves commuter and long-distance trains. It is the nearest Metro station to the Paseo del Prado. It is located between the neighborhoods of Embajadores (Centro), Jerónimos (Retiro) and Atocha (Arganzuela).

The station was originally named Atocha after the street on which it is located. On 1 December 2018 its name was changed to Estación del Arte, which reflects is proximity to multiple museums, including the Prado Museum, the Reina Sofía Museum, the Thyssen-Bornemisza Museum and the Círculo de Bellas Artes. The name change also avoids confusion with the larger neighboring Madrid Atocha station, which is located on the same Metro line and also serves commuter and long-distance trains.
