= Congosto (Madrid Metro) =

Madrid Metro station

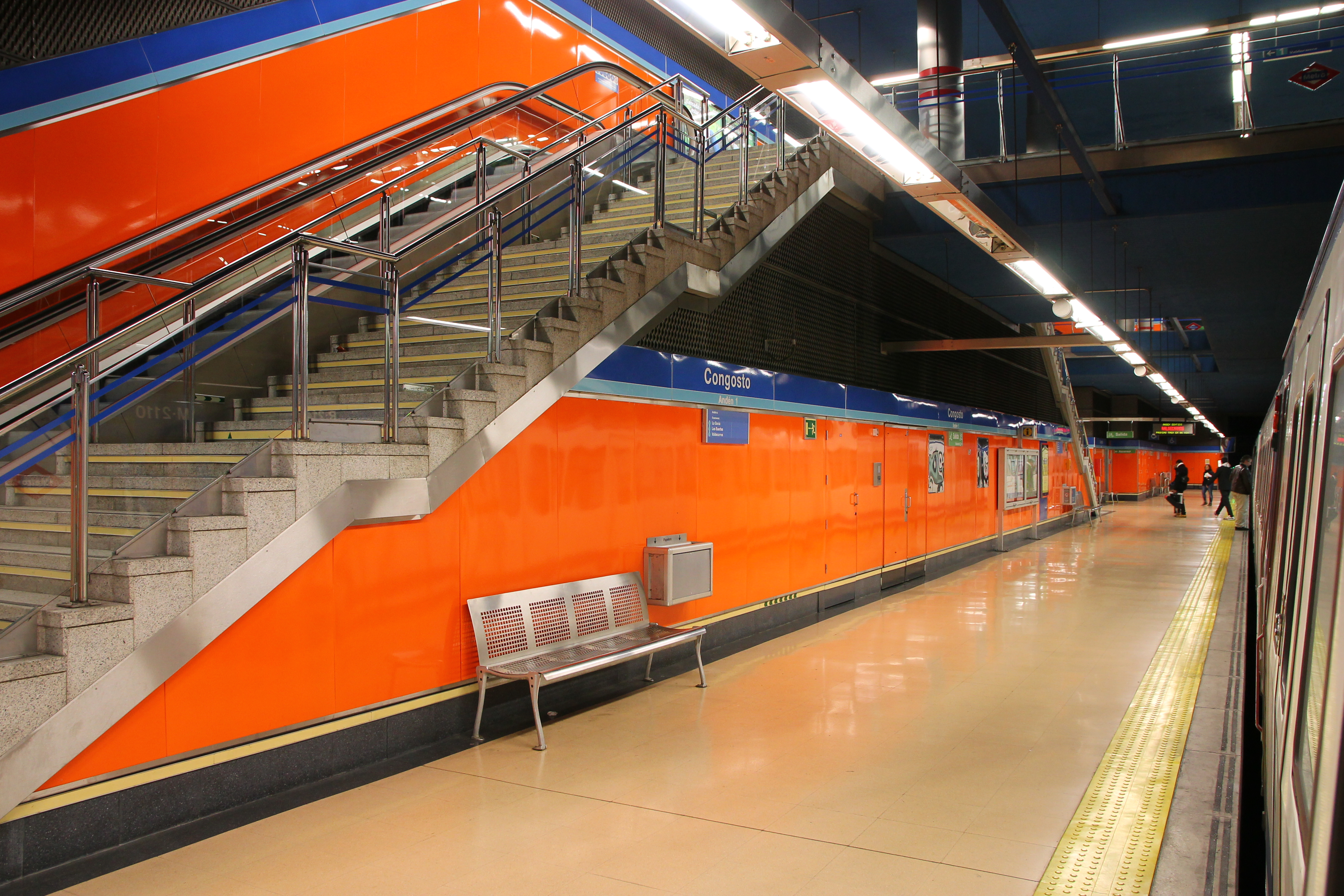
- Platform of the station

General information
- Location: Villa de Vallecas, Madrid; Spain
- Coordinates: 40.3723846°N 3.6188449°W
- System: Madrid Metro station
- Owner: CRTM
- Operator: CRTM

Construction
- Structure type: Underground
- Accessible: Yes

Other information
- Fare zone: A

History
- Opened: 3 March 1999; 27 years ago

Services
Preceding station	Madrid Metro	Following station
Villa de Vallecas towards Pinar de Chamartín	Line 1	La Gavia towards Valdecarros
Location
- Location within Madrid

Congosto [koŋˈɡosto] is a station on Line 1 of the Madrid Metro. It is located in fare Zone A. The station opened on 3 March 1999. It is named for the Calle Congosto.
