= Bilbao (Madrid Metro) =

Madrid Metro station

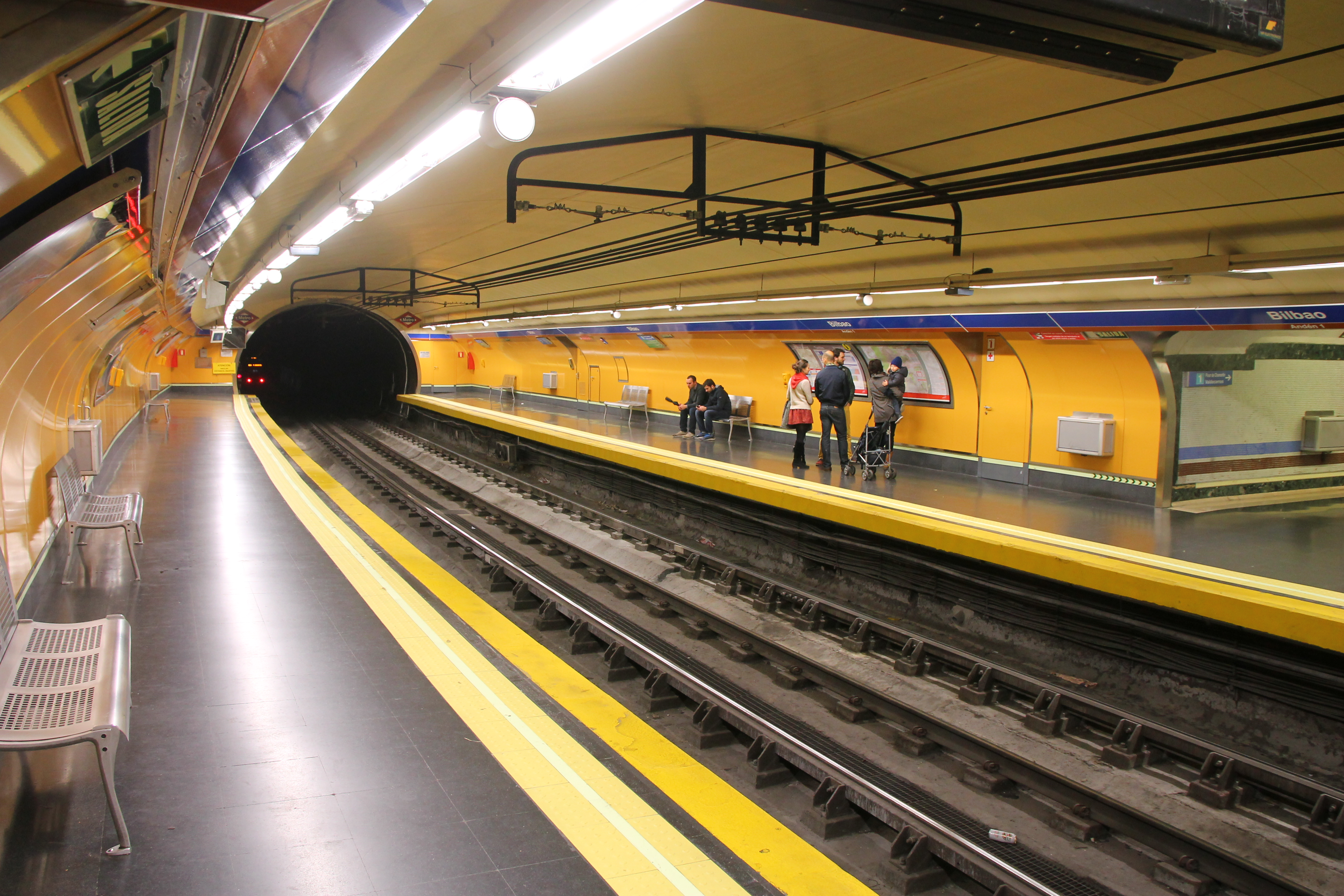
- Line 4 platforms at Bilbao

General information
- Location: Centro / Chamberí, Madrid; Spain
- Coordinates: 40.4290543°N 3.7021816°W
- System: Madrid Metro station
- Owner: CRTM
- Operator: CRTM

Construction
- Structure type: Underground
- Accessible: Yes

Other information
- Fare zone: A

History
- Opened: 17 October 1919; 107 years ago

Services
Preceding station	Madrid Metro	Following station
Iglesia towards Pinar de Chamartín	Line 1	Tribunal towards Valdecarros
San Bernardo towards Argüelles	Line 4	Alonso Martínez towards Pinar de Chamartín
Location
- Location within Madrid

Bilbao [bilˈβao] is a station on Line 1 and Line 4 of the Madrid Metro. It is located in Zone A and is near to the Glorieta de Bilbao.

== History ==
The station opened in 1919 on Line 1 and is one of the first eight stations on the network between Cuatro Caminos and Sol. The Line 4 station opened in 1944 on the first section on the line between Argüelles and Goya.

Following nearly two years of extensive construction works, the station reopened in July 2020, now equipped with a total of seven elevators and updated wall linings.
