= Menéndez Pelayo (Madrid Metro) =

Madrid Metro station

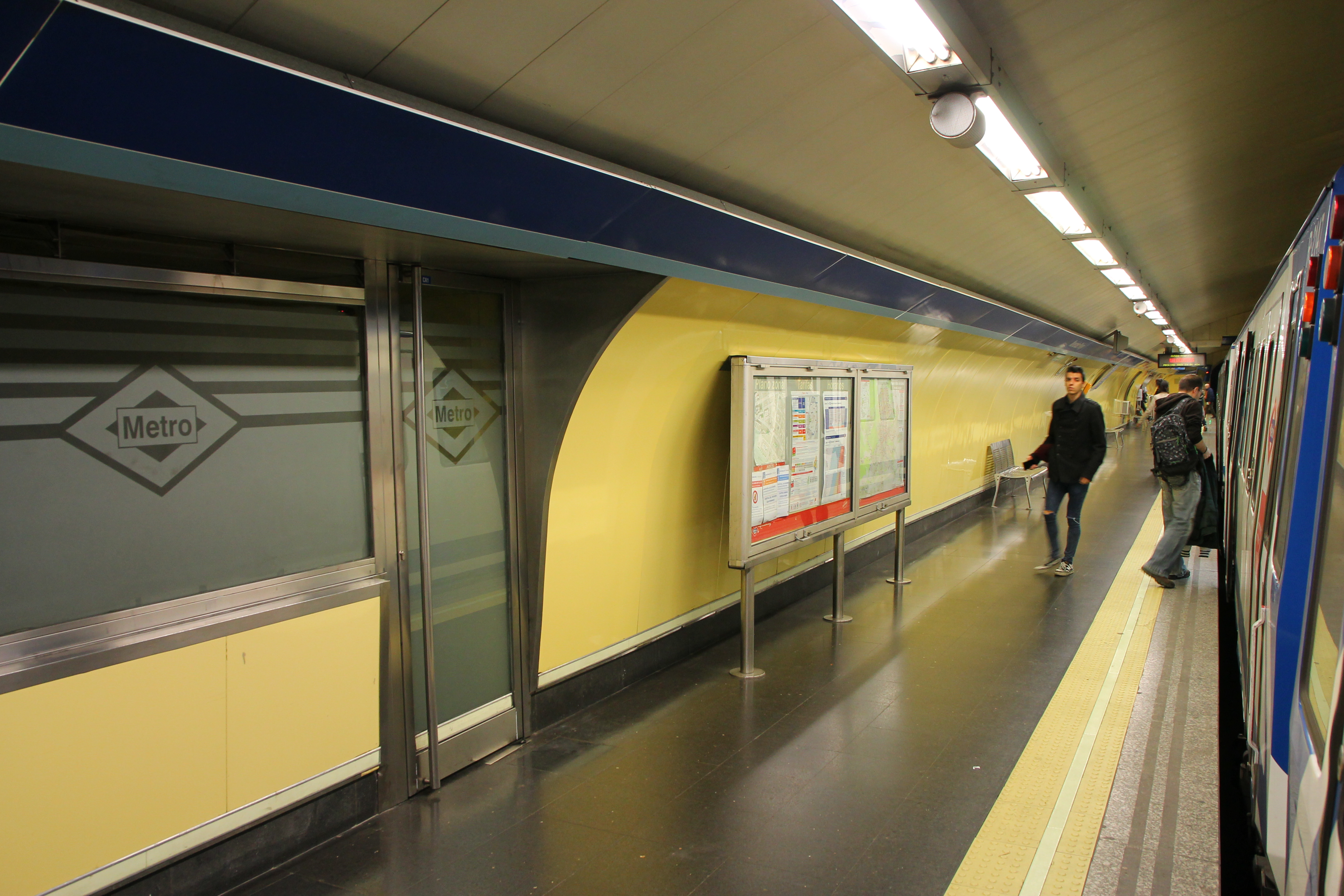
- Platform of the station

General information
- Location: Retiro, Madrid; Spain
- Coordinates: 40.404451°N 3.6809847°W
- System: Madrid Metro station
- Owner: CRTM
- Operator: CRTM

Construction
- Structure type: Underground
- Accessible: No

Other information
- Fare zone: A

History
- Opened: 8 May 1923; 103 years ago

Services
Preceding station	Madrid Metro	Following station
Atocha towards Pinar de Chamartín	Line 1	Pacífico towards Valdecarros
Location
- Location within Madrid

Menéndez Pelayo [meˈnendeθ peˈlaʝo] is a station on Line 1 of the Madrid Metro. It is located in Zone A. It was opened on 8 May 1923. It is named for the Avenida de Menéndez Pelayo, which is named in turn for the scholar Marcelino Menéndez y Pelayo (1856–1912).
