= Villa de Vallecas (Madrid Metro) =

Madrid Metro station

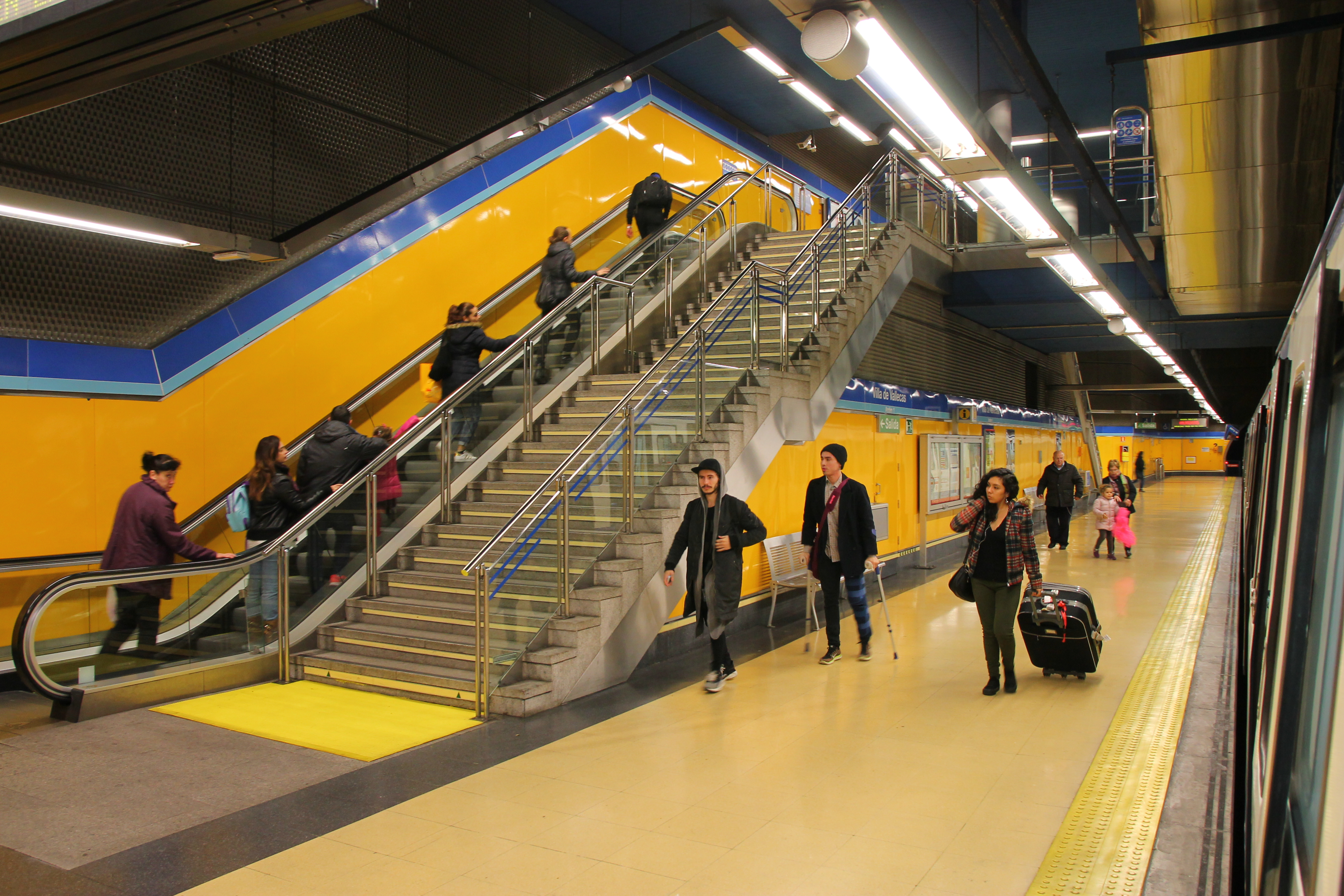
- Platform of the station

General information
- Location: Villa de Vallecas, Madrid; Spain
- Coordinates: 40.3795968°N 3.621302°W
- System: Madrid Metro station
- Owner: CRTM
- Operator: CRTM

Construction
- Structure type: Underground
- Accessible: Yes

Other information
- Fare zone: A

History
- Opened: 3 March 1999; 27 years ago

Services
Preceding station	Madrid Metro	Following station
Sierra de Guadalupe towards Pinar de Chamartín	Line 1	Congosto towards Valdecarros
Location
- Location within Madrid

Villa de Vallecas [ˈbiʝa ðe βaˈʝekas] is a station on Line 1 of the Madrid Metro. It is located in fare Zone A. The station has been opened since 3 March 1999.
