= Gran Vía (Madrid Metro) =

Madrid Metro station

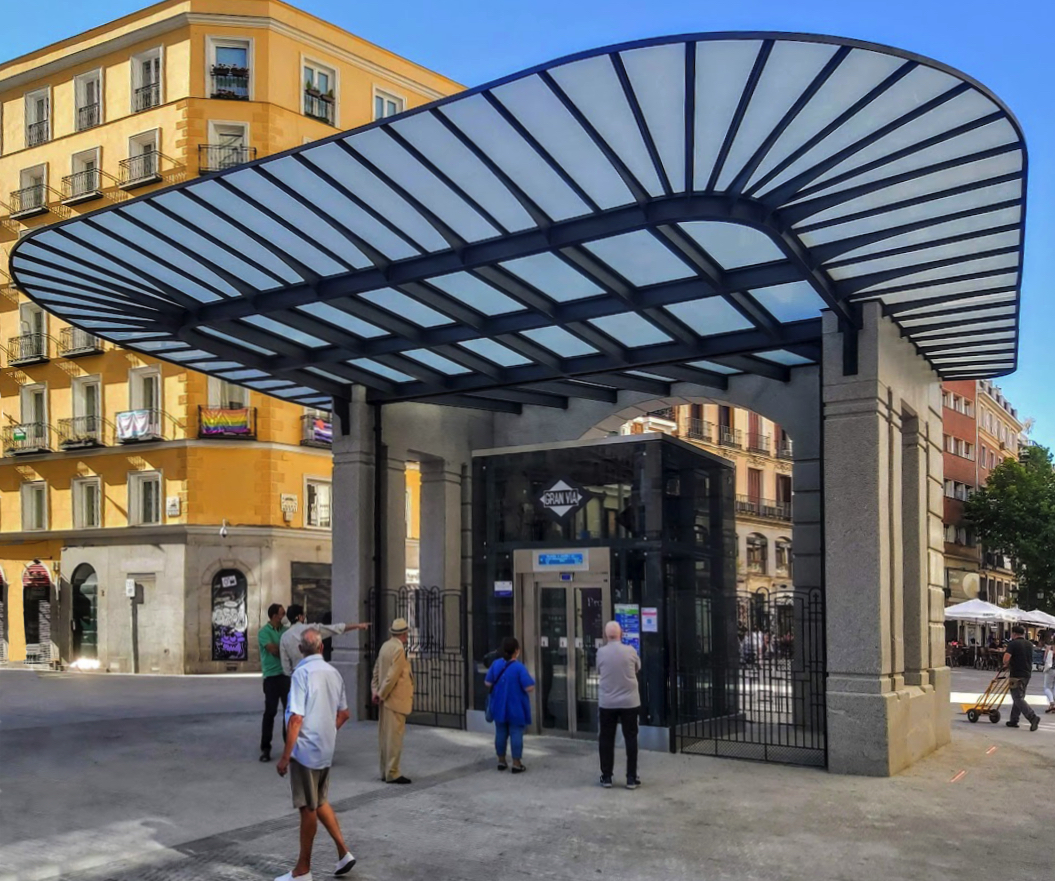

General information
- Location: Centro, Madrid; Spain
- Coordinates: 40.4200103°N 3.7018052°W
- System: Madrid Metro station
- Owner: CRTM
- Operator: CRTM

Construction
- Structure type: Underground
- Accessible: Yes

Other information
- Fare zone: A

History
- Opened: 17 October 1919; 106 years ago
- Rebuilt: 2018–2021

Services
Preceding station	Madrid Metro	Following station
Tribunal towards Pinar de Chamartín	Line 1	Sol towards Valdecarros
Chueca towards Alameda de Osuna	Line 5	Callao towards Casa de Campo
Out of system interchange
Preceding station	Cercanías Madrid	Following station
Nuevos Ministerios towards Chamartín	C-3 transfer at Sol	Atocha towards Aranjuez
Nuevos Ministerios towards Santa María de la Alameda	C-3a transfer at Sol	Atocha towards Aranjuez
Nuevos Ministerios towards Alcobendas-San Sebastián de los Reyes or Colmenar Viejo	C-4 transfer at Sol	Atocha towards Parla
Preceding station	Madrid Metro	Following station
Sevilla towards Las Rosas	Line 2 transfer at Sol	Ópera towards Cuatro Caminos
Lavapiés towards El Casar	Line 3 transfer at Sol	Callao towards Moncloa
Location
- Location within Madrid

Gran Vía [ˈɡɾam ˈbi.a] is a station on Line 1 and Line 5 of the Madrid Metro, located underneath the Gran Vía ("Great Way") and Red de San Luis Plaza in the Centro district of Madrid. It is located in fare zone A.

== History ==
The station was opened in 1919 as one of the original 8 metro stops in Madrid. The original name of the station was Red de San Luis after the nearby plaza. The Gran Vía street was still under construction at that time, but a year later the station adopted that name.

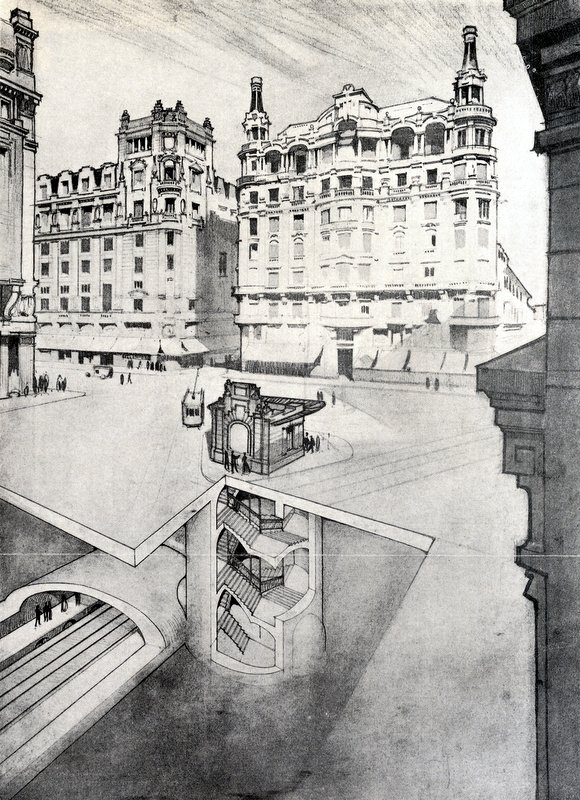
Drawing of the station by Antonio Palacios, 1918

During the dictatorship of Franco, the name was changed again to José Antonio. This was done in parallel with the renaming of the Gran Vía street to José Antonio Avenue by Franco, in honor of José Antonio, founder of the fascist party Falange.

In 1970, the Line 5 platforms opened under the name José Antonio. Fourteen years later, in 1984, the station returned to its previous name of Gran Vía.

For many years, the station was known for the elaborate edifice that housed the elevators, built by the architect Antonio Palacios. It was constructed of polished granite with an iron and glass canopy. To use the elevator, customers had to pay a small fee. The original vestibule, also done by Palacios, was decorated with glazed tiles. When the edifice was dismantled in 1972, it was returned to O Porriño, the architect's hometown. A replica of this structure has since been installed in the station. Subsequently, with the comprehensive reform of 2018, the project to install a replica of it in its original location was carried out. During the works, the original remains of said temple appeared, specifically the elevator shaft, located at the end of Calle Montera and Gran Vía.

Since July 3, 2016, the platforms of Line 1 of the station have been closed due to works to improve the facilities on the line between the stations of Plaza de Castilla and Sierra de Guadalupe. The completion of the works It was scheduled for November 12, 2016, with the station platforms reopening on November 13, when the work was completed and service was restored on the last section of Line 1 to open, between the Cuatro Caminos and Atocha Renfe stations. In this section, the actions carried out were: the waterproofing and consolidation of the tunnel, the oldest in the Madrid underground, which was reinforced by means of cement injections and special concrete projections with metal support meshes, and the installation of the rigid catenary, as well as the assembly of the rest of the facilities and services. Since July 2017, Line 5 has been closed and reopened in September.

=== Renovation works (2018–2021) ===
From 2018 to 2021, the station underwent major renovations and physical expansions, which included the construction of a pedestrian tunnel to the nearby Sol station, at an estimated cost of €18 million. Following a number of significant delays, the station was finally reopened to the public on 16 July 2021. The delay was caused by the finding of the remains of the Palacios elevator and stairs and a collapse risk of the tunnel to the commuter railway station.

Originally, the completion date of the works was scheduled for April 2019, but later it was delayed to mid-October, the first quarter of 2020, March 2020 and "late 2020 or early 2021". The COVID-19 crisis postponed the progress of the works and the reopening date. On November 16, 2020, the Community of Madrid announced that the reform works could end in the summer of 2021, limiting, after an announcement on April 7, 2021, to the month of July. On June 3, the final date for the opening of the station was announced, July 16, 2021.
