= Estrecho (Madrid Metro) =

Madrid Metro station

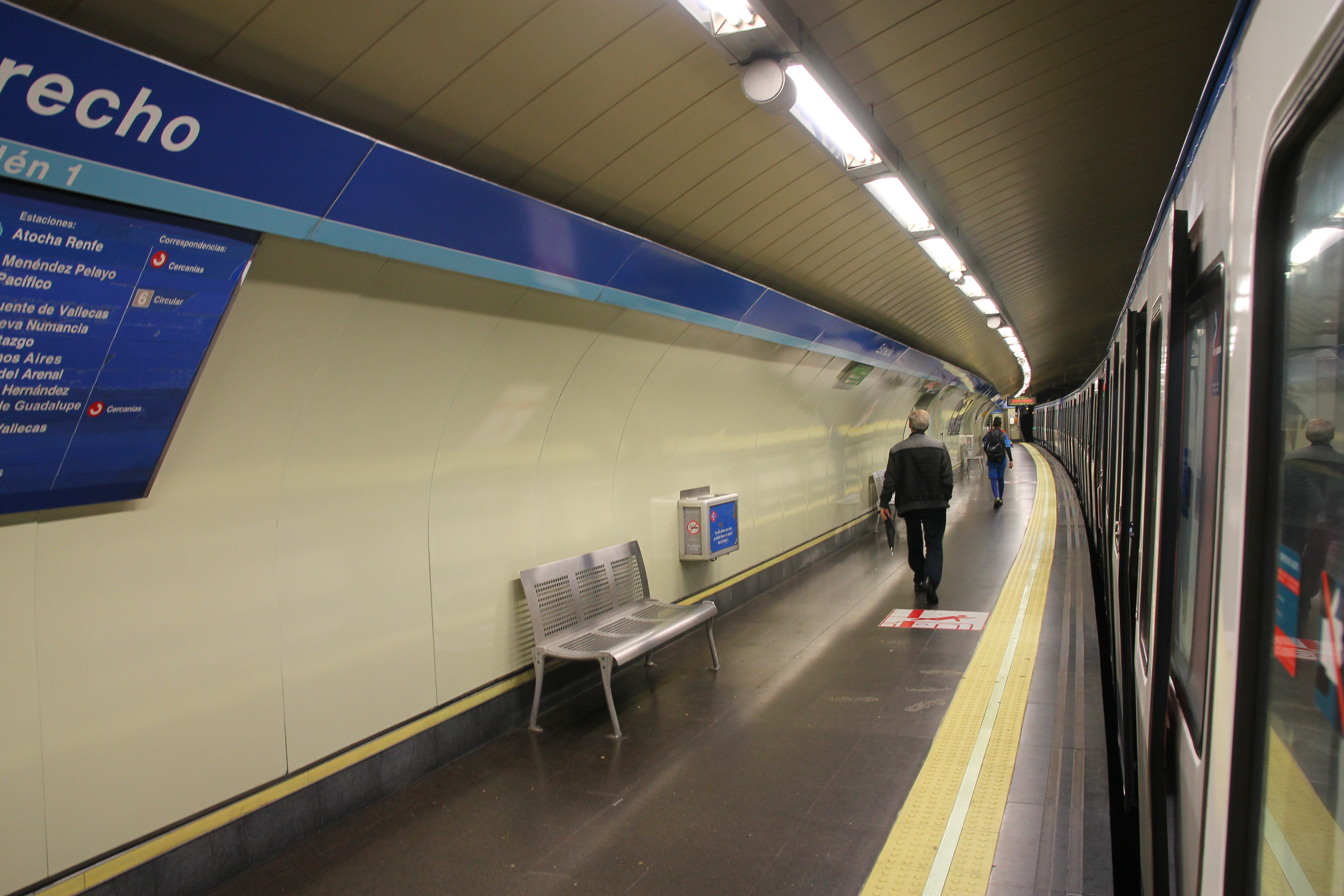
- Platform of the station

General information
- Location: Tetuán, Madrid; Spain
- Coordinates: 40.4542836°N 3.7030217°W
- System: Madrid Metro station
- Owner: CRTM
- Operator: CRTM

Construction
- Structure type: Underground
- Accessible: No

Other information
- Station code: 7
- Fare zone: A

History
- Opened: 3 June 1929; 97 years ago

Services
Preceding station	Madrid Metro	Following station
Tetuán towards Pinar de Chamartín	Line 1	Alvarado towards Valdecarros
Location
- Location within Madrid

Estrecho [esˈtɾetʃo] is a station on Line 1 of the Madrid Metro, opened on 3 June 1929. It is located in Zone A. It is named for its location in the Estrecho neighbourhood, which is named for the Straits of Gibraltar (Spanish: Estrecho de Gibraltar).
