= Altaria =

Altaria may refer to:

- Altaria (Pokémon), a fictional species of Pokémon
- Altaria (Renfe Operadora service), a Spanish rail line
- Altaria (band), a Finnish musical group
