= Iglesia =

Iglesia may refer to:

- Iglesia, the Spanish form of church
- Iglesia Department
- Iglesia ni Cristo
- Iglesia Filipina Independiente
- Iglesia (Metro Madrid), a station on Line 1
