= Iglesia (Madrid Metro) =

Madrid Metro station

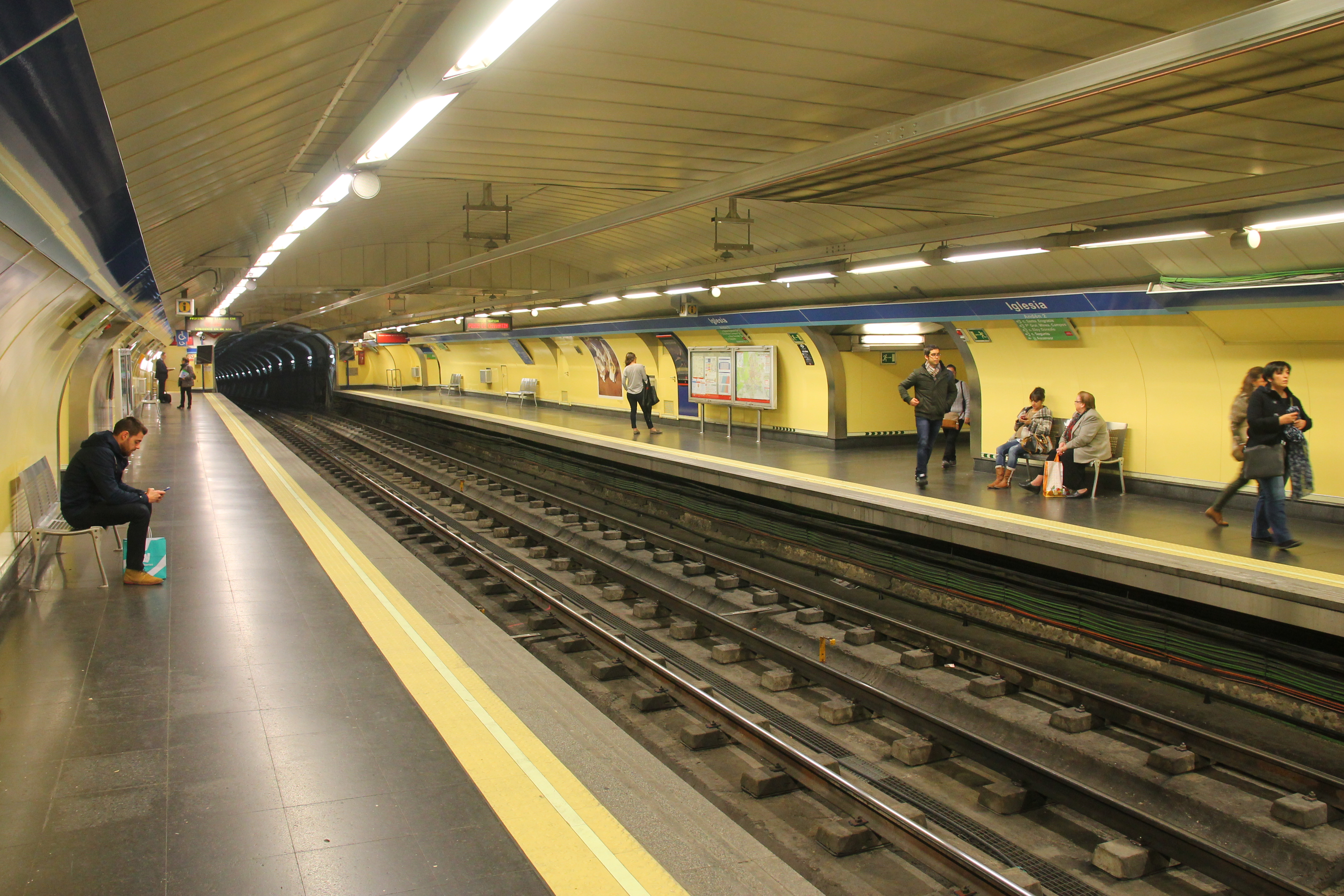
- Iglesia

General information
- Location: Chamberí, Madrid; Spain
- Coordinates: 40.4349206°N 3.6989767°W
- System: Madrid Metro station
- Owner: CRTM
- Operator: CRTM

Construction
- Structure type: Underground
- Accessible: Yes

Other information
- Fare zone: A

History
- Opened: 17 October 1919; 106 years ago

Services
Preceding station	Madrid Metro	Following station
Ríos Rosas towards Pinar de Chamartín	Line 1	Bilbao towards Valdecarros
Location
- Location within Madrid

Iglesia [iˈɣlesja] is a station on Line 1 of the Madrid Metro.

== History ==
The station opened on 17 October 1919 and is one of the first 8 stations on the network. It had been originally called "Martínez Campos" before it was renamed "Iglesia" (Church) in the 1920s, for the nearby Iglesia de Santa Teresa y Santa Isabel. It is less than 500 m (550 yd) from the closed Chamberí station which is now a museum.
