= Line 1 (Madrid Metro) =

Rapid transit line of the Madrid Metro

Coordinates: 40.4125°N 3.6994°W

- A Class 2000A train at Cuatro Caminos station

Overview
- Native name: Línea 1
- Owner: CRTM
- Locale: Madrid
- Termini: Pinar de Chamartín; Valdecarros
- Stations: 33
- Website: www.metromadrid.es/en/linea/linea-1

Service
- Type: Rapid transit
- System: Madrid Metro
- Operator: CRTM
- Rolling stock: CAF 2000-A
- Ridership: 7.5 million monthly trips

History
- Opened: 31 October 1919; 106 years ago
- Last extension: 2007

Technical
- Line length: 23.876 km (14.836 mi)
- Character: Underground
- Track gauge: 1,445 mm (4 ft 8 7/8 in)

Map of the line 1.

Line 1 of the Madrid Metro is an underground metro line running from Pinar de Chamartín in the north to Valdecarros in the southeast, via Sol. Today it has 33 stations (more than any other line on the Madrid Metro) and spans 24 km (14.9 mi) from end to end.

The line was the first metro line of the Madrid Metro, and the first metro line built in all of Spain. It originally contained only 8 stops connecting Cuatro Caminos in the north to the city center at Puerta del Sol. Line 1 marks the start of the Madrid Metro with its inauguration on 17 October 1919 and public service beginning 14 days later on 31 October. There have been various extensions to the line since it opened including the most recent northern extension to Pinar de Chamartin on 11 April 2007 and a southern extension on 16 May 2007 to Valdecarros.

Line 1 is the second busiest line on the Madrid Metro, behind Line 6, with more than 7.5 million monthly trips.

== History ==
=== Original line and pre-war extensions ===
The original Madrid Metro in 1919

The Line 1 was the first line of the Madrid Metro, and was inaugurated on 17 October 1919. It was opened to the public on 31 October 1919. It originally ran from Cuatro Caminos and Sol, containing 6 intermediate stops: Red de San Luis (now Gran Vía), Hospicio (now Tribunal), Bilbao, Chamberí, Martinez Campos (now Iglesia), and Ríos Rosas.

The original line was extended from Sol to Atocha in 1921, then further to Puente de Vallecas in 1923. It was extended from Cuatro Caminos to Tetuán in 1929.

=== During Franquismo ===
The line was expanded from Tetuán to Plaza de Castilla in 1961, and from Puente de Vallecas to Portazgo in 1962.

From 1964 to 1966, station platforms were extended from 60 metres (196 ft 10 in) to 90 metres (295 ft 3 in) in order to allow 6-car trains, due to heavy increasing passenger flow. This resulted in the closing of Chamberí station, whose platforms could not be lengthened due to it being located on a sharp curve near Iglesia station. The old Chamberí station, however, was reopened to the public in 2008 as part of the Madrid Metro's Platform 0 project, now functioning primarily as a historic exhibition.

=== Recent improvements ===
In recent years, the line has been extended both north and south. Firstly, in 1988 Atocha Renfe was added between the stations of Atocha and Menéndez Pelayo to serve the new long-distance rail station of Atocha. On 1 April 1994, it was extended from Portazgo to Miguel Hernández and on 4 March 1999 from Miguel Hernández to Congosto.

In 2007, the line was extended to Pinar de Chamartín in two stages. First, on 30 March 2007, the line was extended from Plaza de Castilla to Chamartín, which provides interchange with Line 10 and Renfe services. The new metro complex has line 1 and in the future, line 11 on the lower level and line 10 on the upper level. On 11 April 2007 the extension to Pinar de Chamartín was completed. Here, there is interchange available to Line 4. There are two side platforms for arrivals and an island platform for departures. In May 2007, interchange to Metro Ligero 1 was available, which terminates one level higher.

On 16 May 2007, the line was extended south from Congosto to Valdecarros with two intermediate stations.

Line 1 was closed for reforms from 3 July 2016 to October 2016. 25 of the 33 stations were closed for a €70 million refurbishment project meant to modernize the line, the oldest in the system, and repair tunnel linings and replacing power cables. Replacement buses were offered to patrons during the closure.

== Rolling stock ==
Since the summer of 2007, the line uses CAF class 2000A rolling stock trains. The trains are to be replaced by 40 new trains in the Late 2020s

== Stations ==
| District | Station | Opened | Zone | Connections |
|---|---|---|---|---|
| Ciudad Lineal | Pinar de Chamartín | 2007 | A | Madrid Metro: Metro Ligero: |
| Chamartín | Bambú | 2007 | A | |
| Chamartín | Chamartín | 1961 | A | Madrid Metro: Cercanías Madrid: Renfe Operadora: AVE, Alvia, Altaria, Talgo, Trenhotel |
| Chamartín / Tetuán | Plaza de Castilla | 1961 | A | Madrid Metro: |
| Tetuán | Valdeacederas | 1961 | A | |
| Tetuán | Tetuán | 1929 | A | |
| Tetuán | Estrecho | 1929 | A | |
| Tetuán | Alvarado | 1929 | A | |
| Tetuán / Chamberí | Cuatro Caminos | 1919 | A | Madrid Metro: |
| Chamberí | Ríos Rosas | 1919 | A | Madrid Metro: (Alonso Cano) (Note: Both stations are displayed on station maps as being distant from one another, and they are not announced as transfer points for one another.) |
| Chamberí | Iglesia | 1919 | A | |
| Chamberí / Centro | Bilbao | 1919 | A | Madrid Metro: |
| Centro | Tribunal | 1919 | A | Madrid Metro: |
| Centro | Gran Vía | 1919 | A | Madrid Metro: Cercanías Madrid: |
| Centro | Sol | 1919 | A | Madrid Metro: Cercanías Madrid: |
| Centro | Tirso de Molina | 1921 | A | |
| Centro | Antón Martín | 1921 | A | |
| Centro / Retiro | Estación del Arte | 1926 | A | |
| Arganzuela | Atocha | 1988 | A | Cercanías Madrid: Renfe Operadora: AVE, Alvia, Alaris, Altaria, Talgo |
| Retiro | Menéndez Pelayo | 1923 | A | |
| Retiro | Pacífico | 1923 | A | Madrid Metro: |
| Retiro / Puente de Vallecas | Puente de Vallecas | 1923 | A | |
| Puente de Vallecas | Nueva Numancia | 1962 | A | |
| Puente de Vallecas | Portazgo | 1962 | A | |
| Puente de Vallecas | Buenos Aires | 1994 | A | |
| Puente de Vallecas | Alto del Arenal | 1994 | A | |
| Puente de Vallecas | Miguel Hernández | 1994 | A | |
| Puente de Vallecas | Sierra de Guadalupe | 1999 | A | Cercanías Madrid: |
| Villa de Vallecas | Villa de Vallecas | 1999 | A | |
| Villa de Vallecas | Congosto | 1999 | A | |
| Villa de Vallecas | La Gavia | 2007 | A | |
| Villa de Vallecas | Las Suertes | 2007 | A | |
| Villa de Vallecas | Valdecarros | 2007 | A | |

== See also ==
- Madrid
- Transport in Madrid
- List of Madrid Metro stations
- List of metro systems
