= La Gavia (Madrid Metro) =

Madrid Metro station

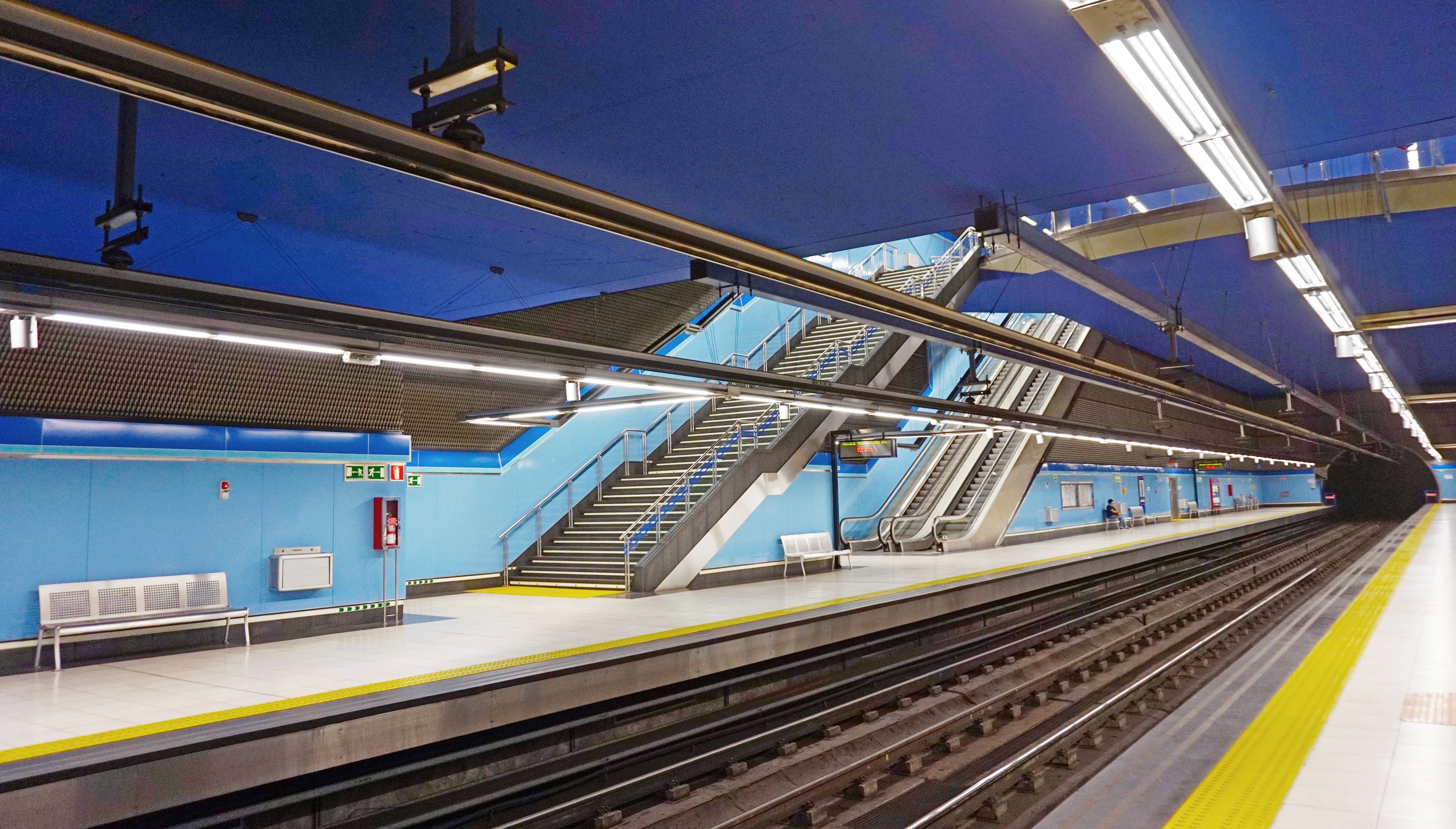
- Platforms of the station

General information
- Location: Villa de Vallecas, Madrid; Spain
- Coordinates: 40.3692237°N 3.6125821°W
- System: Madrid Metro station
- Owner: CRTM
- Operator: CRTM

Construction
- Structure type: Underground
- Accessible: Yes

Other information
- Fare zone: A

History
- Opened: 16 May 2007; 19 years ago

Services
Preceding station	Madrid Metro	Following station
Congosto towards Pinar de Chamartín	Line 1	Las Suertes towards Valdecarros
Location
- Location within Madrid

La Gavia [la ˈɣaβja] is a station on Line 1 of the Madrid Metro. It is located in fare Zone A. The station opened on 16 May 2007. It is named for the nearby Avenida de la Gavia.
