= Las Suertes (Madrid Metro) =

Madrid Metro station

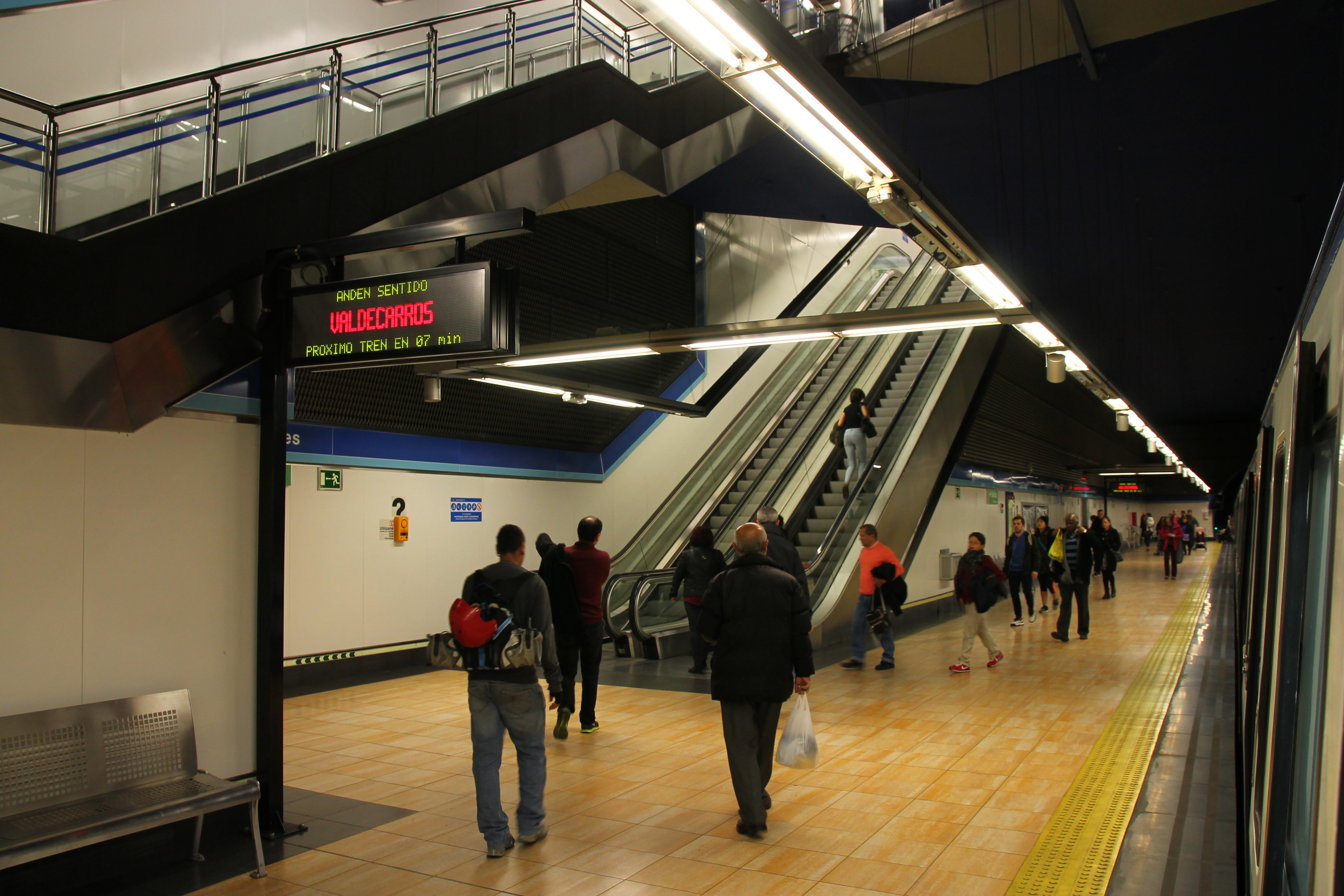

General information
- Location: Villa de Vallecas, Madrid; Spain
- Coordinates: 40°21′48″N 3°35′58″W
- System: Madrid Metro station
- Owner: CRTM
- Operator: CRTM

Construction
- Structure type: Underground
- Accessible: Yes

Other information
- Fare zone: A

History
- Opened: 16 May 2007; 19 years ago

Services
Preceding station	Madrid Metro	Following station
La Gavia towards Pinar de Chamartín	Line 1	Valdecarros Terminus
Location
- Location within Madrid

Las Suertes [las ˈsweɾtes] is a station on Line 1 of the Madrid Metro. It is located in fare Zone A. The station opened on 16 May 2007. Its name comes from the nearby Avenida de las Suertes.
