= Bambú (Madrid Metro) =

Madrid Metro station

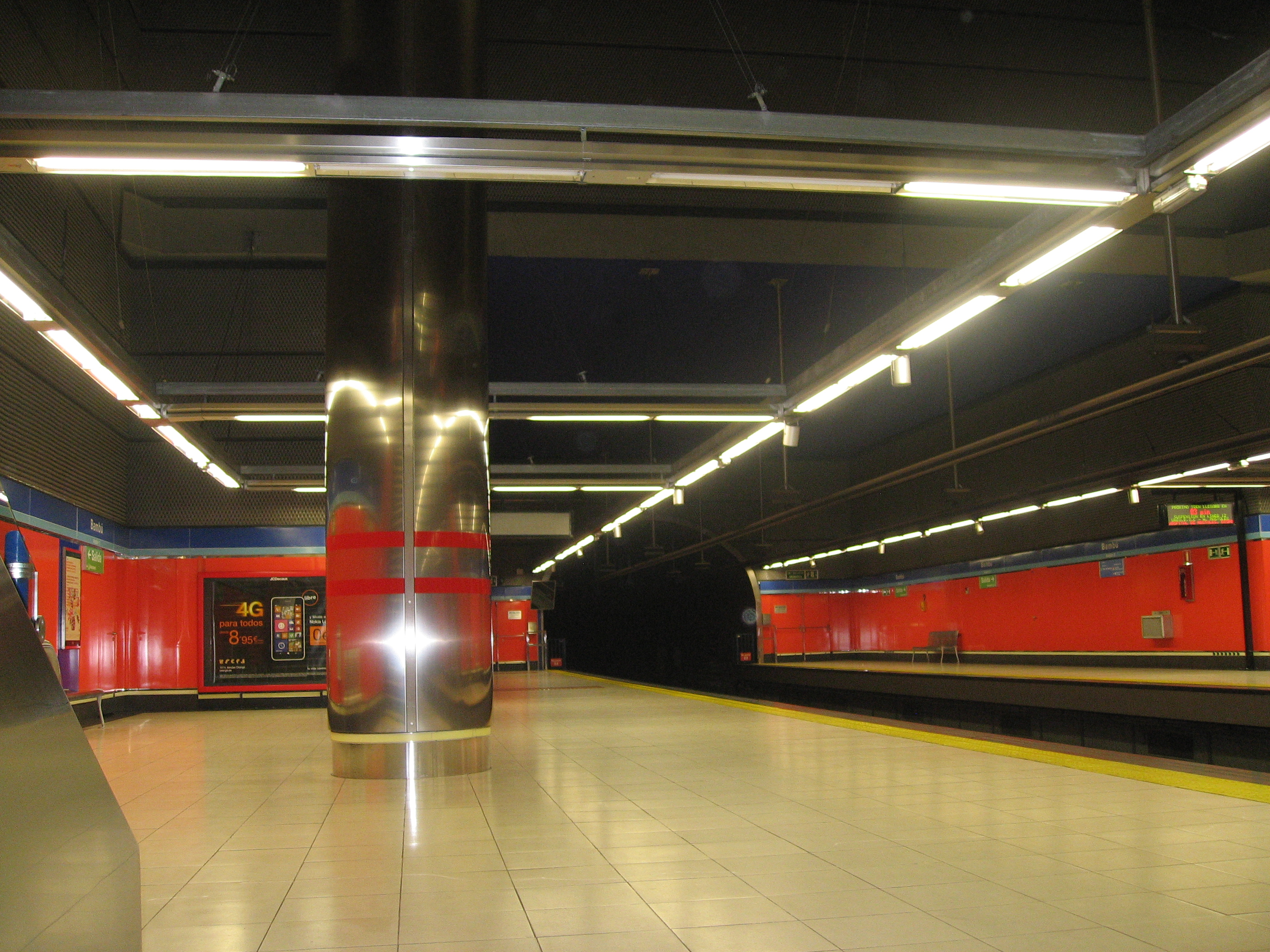

General information
- Location: Chamartín, Madrid; Spain
- Coordinates: 40.4768117°N 3.6763701°W
- System: Madrid Metro station
- Owner: CRTM
- Operator: CRTM

Construction
- Structure type: Underground
- Accessible: Yes

Other information
- Fare zone: A

History
- Opened: 11 April 2007; 19 years ago

Services
Preceding station	Madrid Metro	Following station
Pinar de Chamartín Terminus	Line 1	Chamartín towards Valdecarros
Location
- Location within Madrid

Bambú [bamˈbu] is a station on Line 1 of the Madrid Metro, opened on 4 November 2007. It is located in fare Zone A. It is named for the Calle Bambú.

The station has a single entrance located at Calle de Bambú 14.
