= Gavia =

Gavia may refer to:

- Gavia (bird), a genus of birds to which the loons belong
- Gavia Pass, in the Italian Alps
- Monte Gavia, a mountain of Lombardy, Italy
- La Gavia, Guanajuato, Mexico, a populated place
- USS Gavia (AM-363), a World War II U.S. Navy minesweeper
- Gavia gens, an ancient Roman family
- La Gavia (Madrid Metro), a metro station
