= Museo Nacional Centro de Arte Reina Sofía =

National museum of Spain

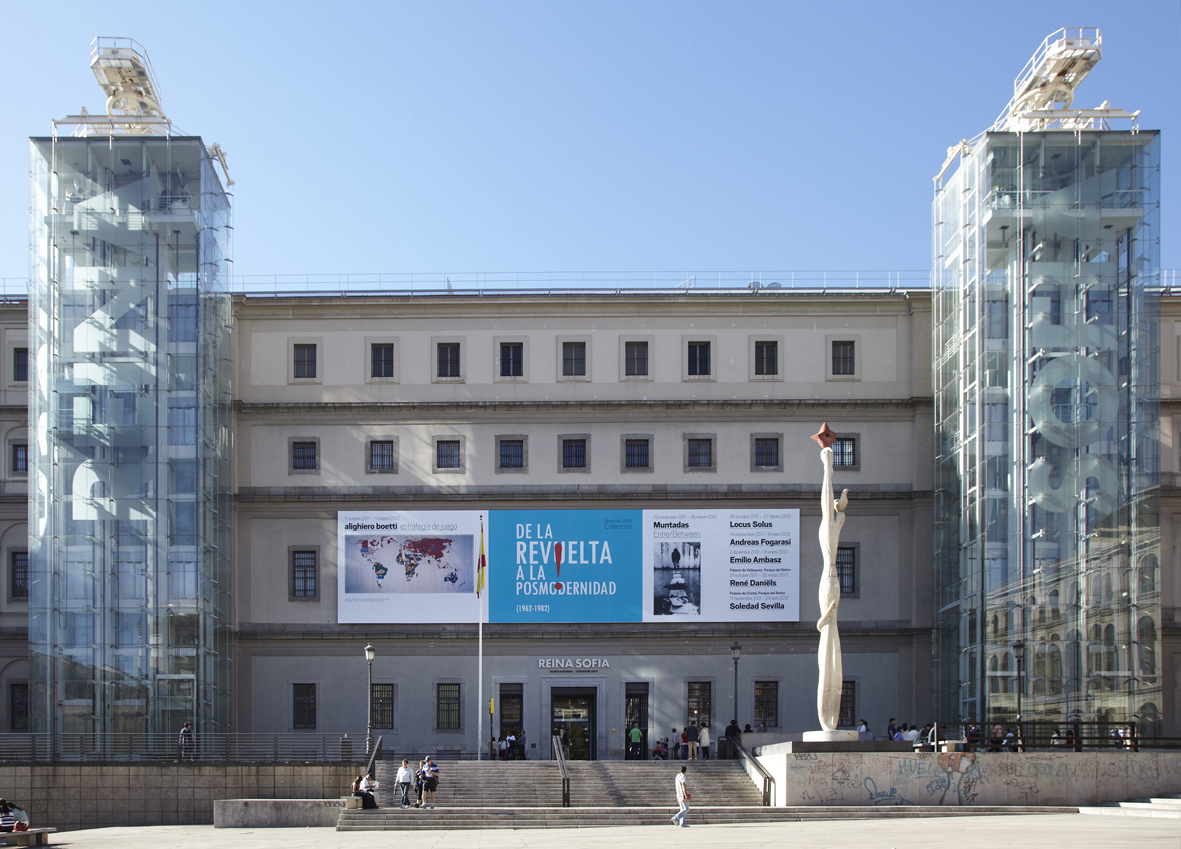
- Museo Reina Sofía
- Interactive fullscreen map
- Established: 10 September 1992; 34 years ago
- Location: Madrid, Spain
- Coordinates: 40°24′31″N 3°41′38″W
- Visitors: 1,601,732 (2025)
- Director: Manuel Segade
- Public transit access: Estación del Arte; Madrid Atocha
- Website: www.museoreinasofia.es

Spanish Cultural Heritage
- Official name: Museo Nacional Centro de Arte Reina Sofía
- Type: Non-movable
- Criteria: Monument
- Designated: 1978
- Reference no.: RI-51-0004260

The Museo Nacional Centro de Arte Reina Sofía ("Queen Sofía National Museum Art Centre"; MNCARS) (Note: Also known in Spanish as the Museo Reina Sofía, El Reina Sofía, or simply el Reina) is Spain's national museum of 20th-century art. The museum was officially inaugurated on September 10, 1992, and is named for Queen Sofía. It is located in Madrid, near the Atocha train and metro stations, at the southern end of what is known as the Golden Triangle of Art (located along the Paseo del Prado and also comprising the Museo del Prado and the Museo Thyssen-Bornemisza).

The museum is mainly dedicated to Spanish art. Highlights of the museum include collections of Spain's two greatest 20th-century masters, Pablo Picasso and Salvador Dalí. The most famous masterpiece in the museum is Picasso's 1937 painting Guernica. Along with its extensive collection, the museum offers a mixture of national and international temporary exhibitions in its many galleries, making it one of the world's largest museums for modern and contemporary art. In 2025 the museum's main site received 1,601,732 visitors, up 4.2 percent on 2024. It consistently ranks among the world's most-visited museums of modern and contemporary art.

It also hosts a free-access library specializing in art, with a collection of over 100,000 books, over 3,500 sound recordings, and almost 1,000 videos.

== Collection ==
The museum is mainly dedicated to Spanish art. Highlights of the museum include collections of Spain's two greatest 20th-century masters, Pablo Picasso and Salvador Dalí. Certainly, the most famous masterpiece in the museum is Picasso's painting Guernica. The Reina Sofía collection has works by artists such as Joan Miró, Eduardo Chillida, Pablo Gargallo, Julio González, Luis Gordillo, Juan Gris, José Gutiérrez Solana, Lucio Muñoz, Jorge Oteiza, Julio Romero de Torres, Pablo Serrano, and Antoni Tàpies.

International art represented in the collection include works by Francis Bacon, Joseph Beuys, Pierre Bonnard, Georges Braque, Alexander Calder, Robert Delaunay, Max Ernst, Lucio Fontana, Sarah Grilo, Damien Hirst, Donald Judd, Wassily Kandinsky, Paul Klee, Yves Klein, Fernand Léger, Jacques Lipchitz, René Magritte, Henry Moore, Bruce Nauman, Gabriel Orozco, Nam June Paik, Man Ray, Diego Rivera, Mark Rothko, Julian Schnabel, Richard Serra, Cindy Sherman, Clyfford Still, Yves Tanguy, and Wolf Vostell.

== Gallery ==
Pablo Picasso, 1912, Les oiseaux morts (Los pájaros muertos), oil on canvas, 46 x 65 cm

Joan Miró, 1918, La casa de la palmera (House with Palm Tree), oil on canvas, 65 x 73 cm
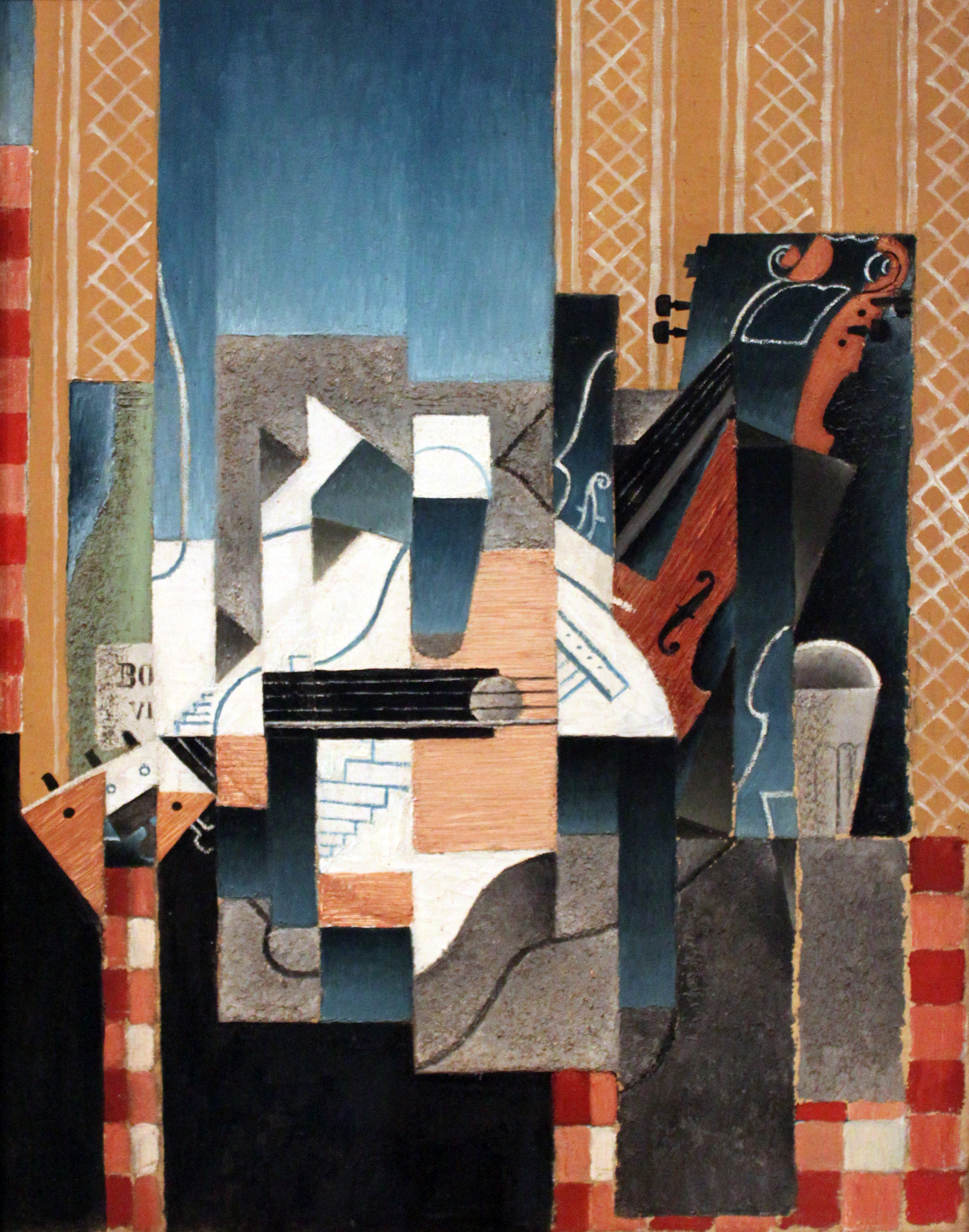
Juan Gris, 1913, Violin and Guitar, oil on canvas, 81 x 60 cm

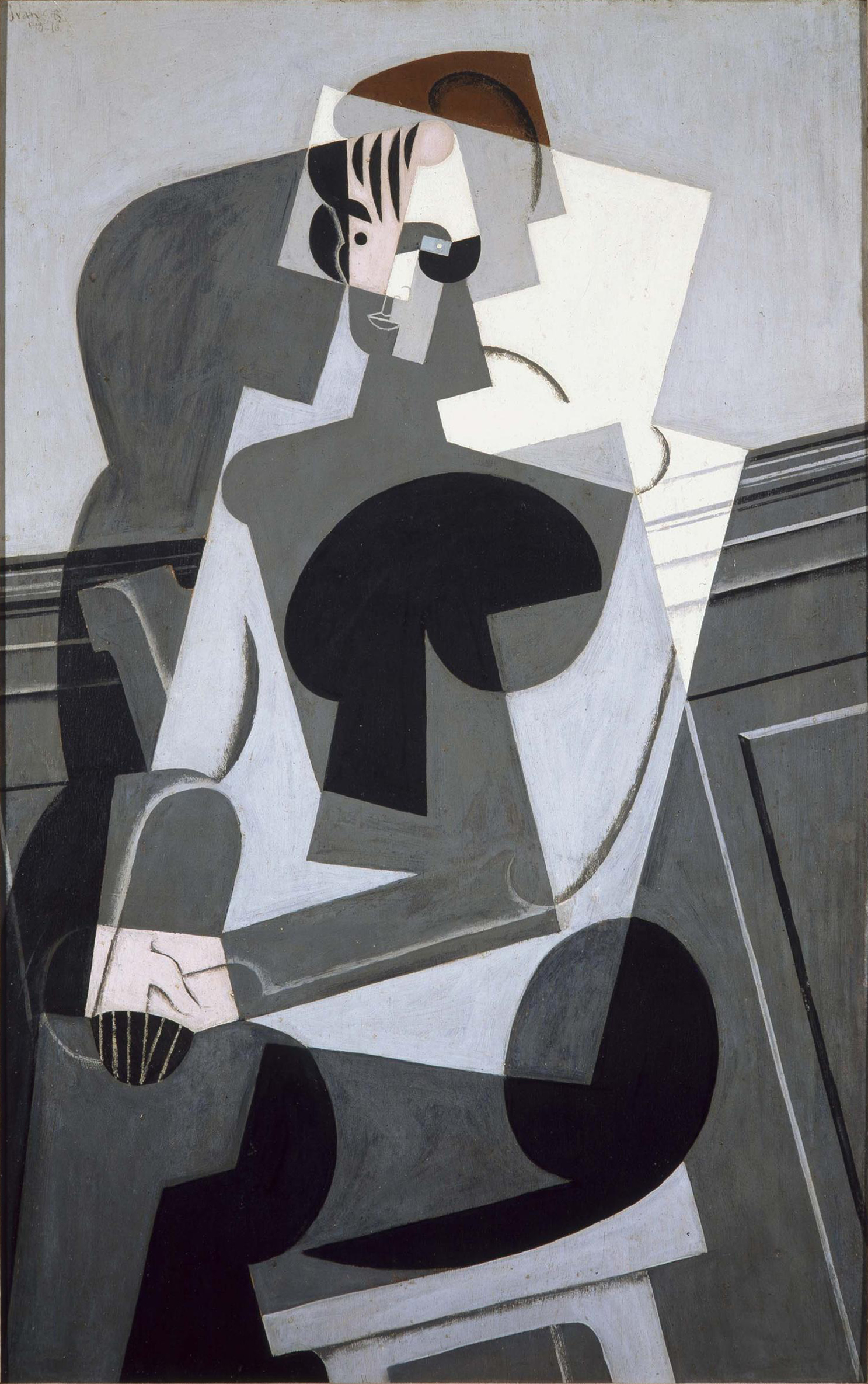
Juan Gris, October 1916, Portrait of Josette, oil on canvas, 116 x 73 cm

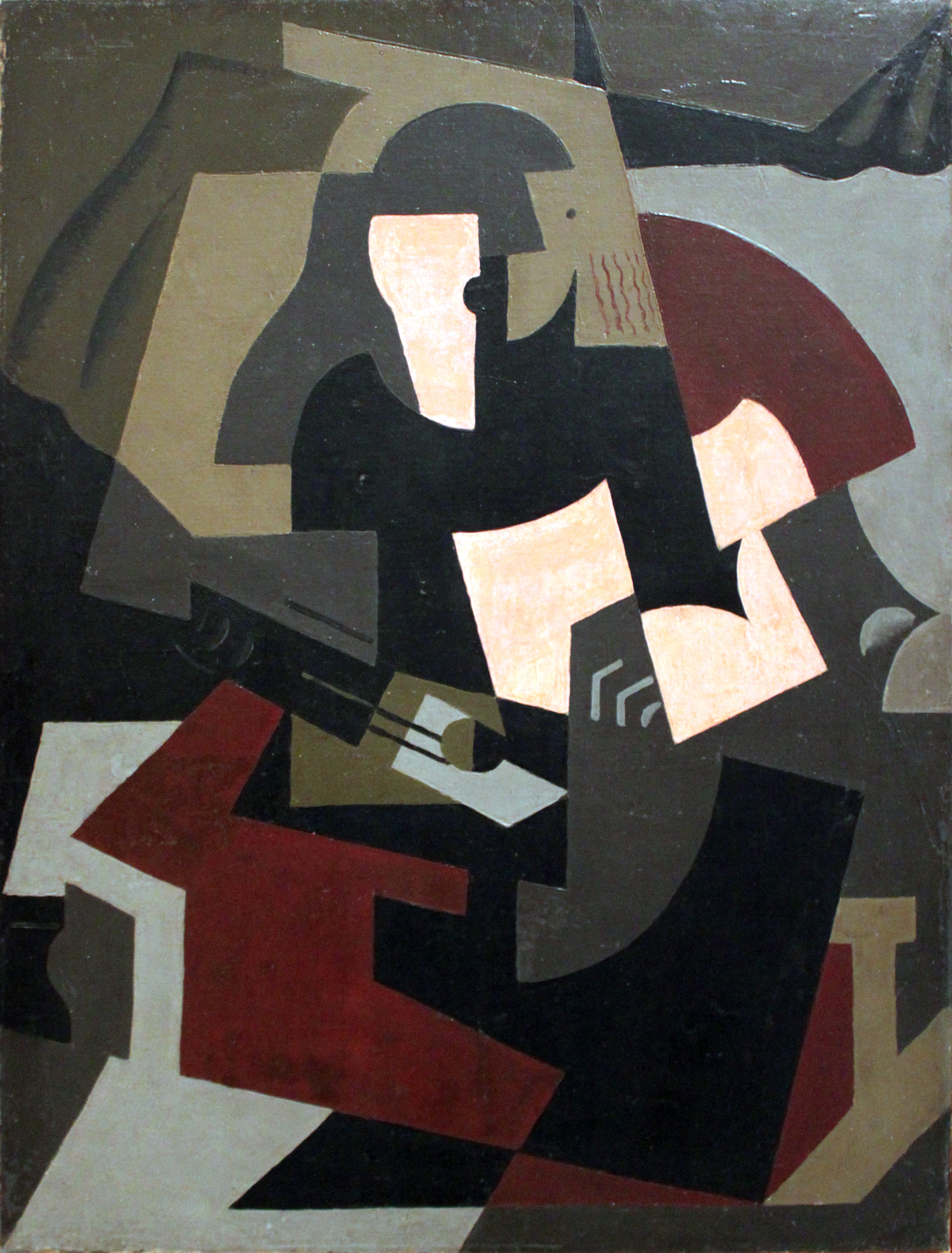
María Blanchard, 1917, Woman with guitar, oil on canvas, 100 x 72 cm

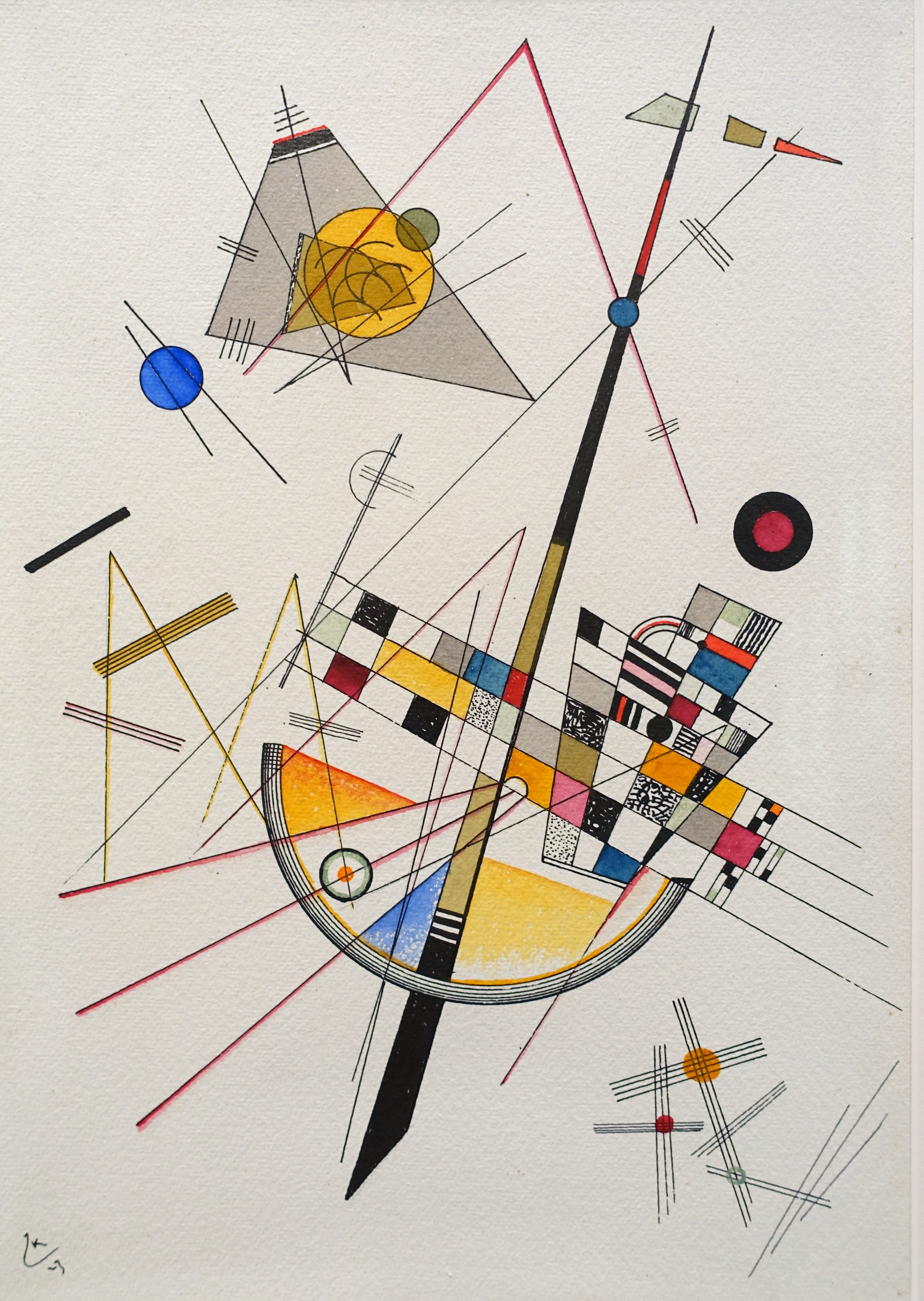
Wassily Kandinsky, 1923, Delicate Tension, watercolor and ink on paper

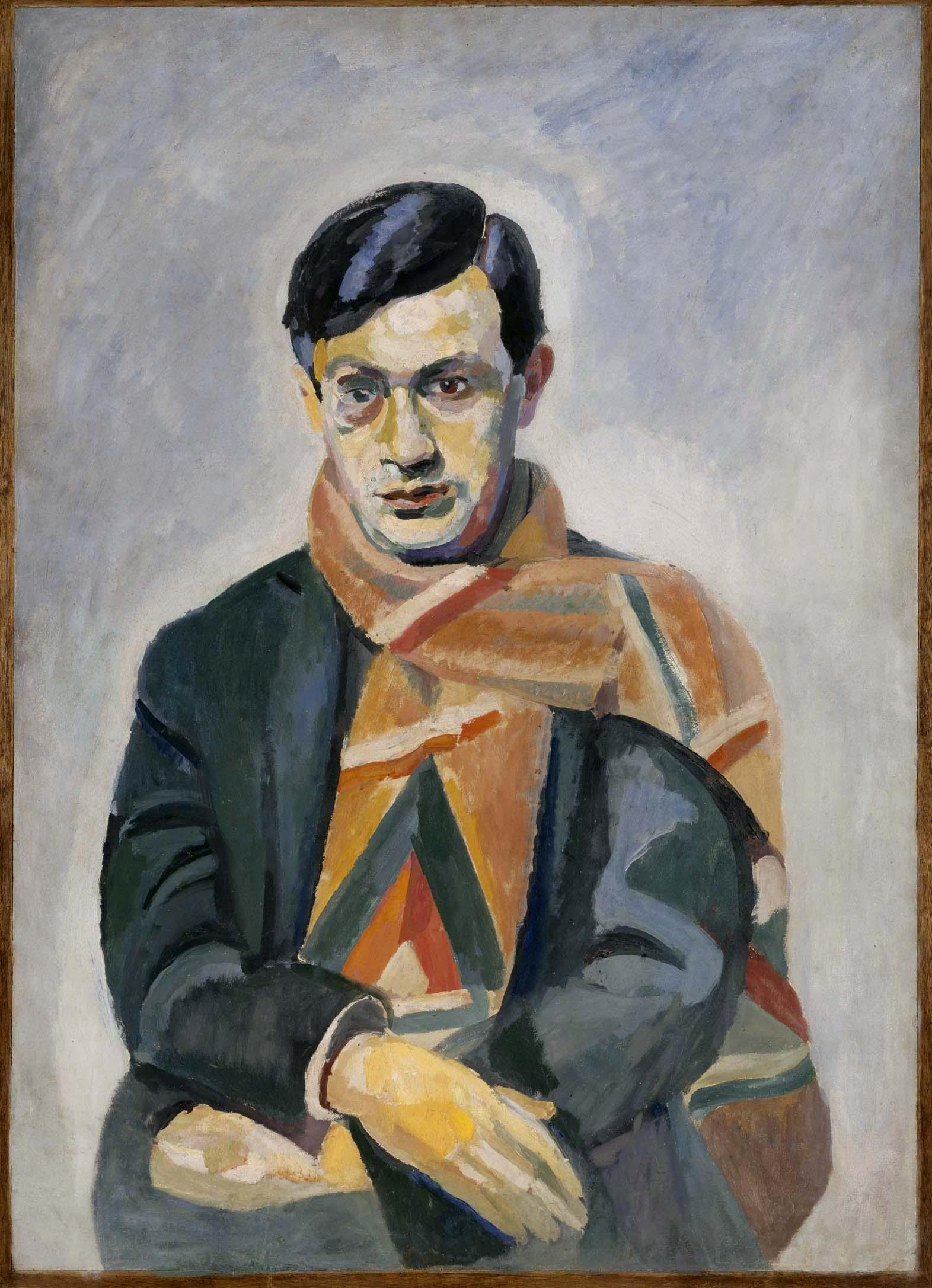
Robert Delaunay, 1923, Portrait of Tristan Tzara, oil on cardboard, 104.5 x 75 cm

== History of the building ==
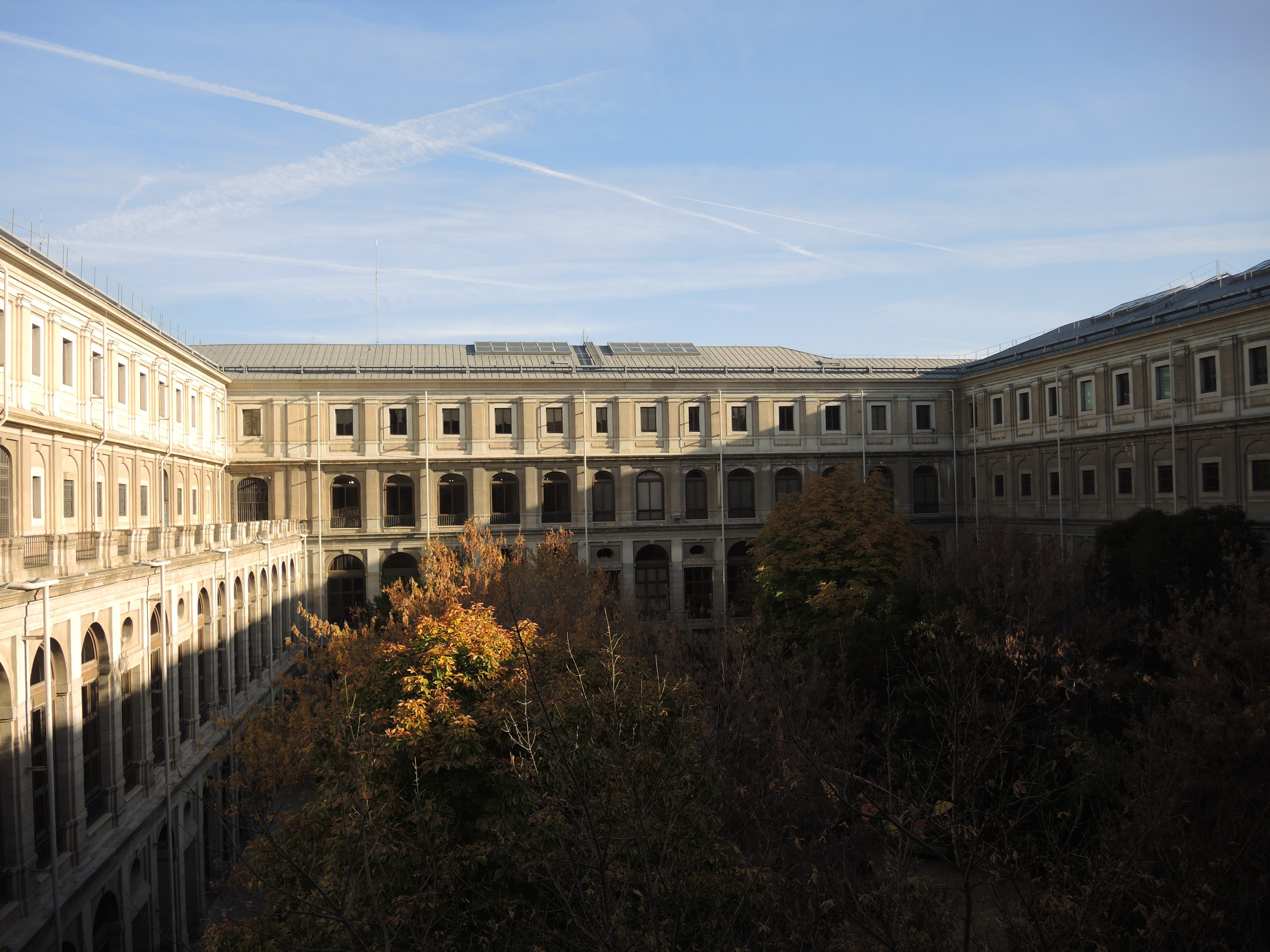
Courtyard in old hospital building

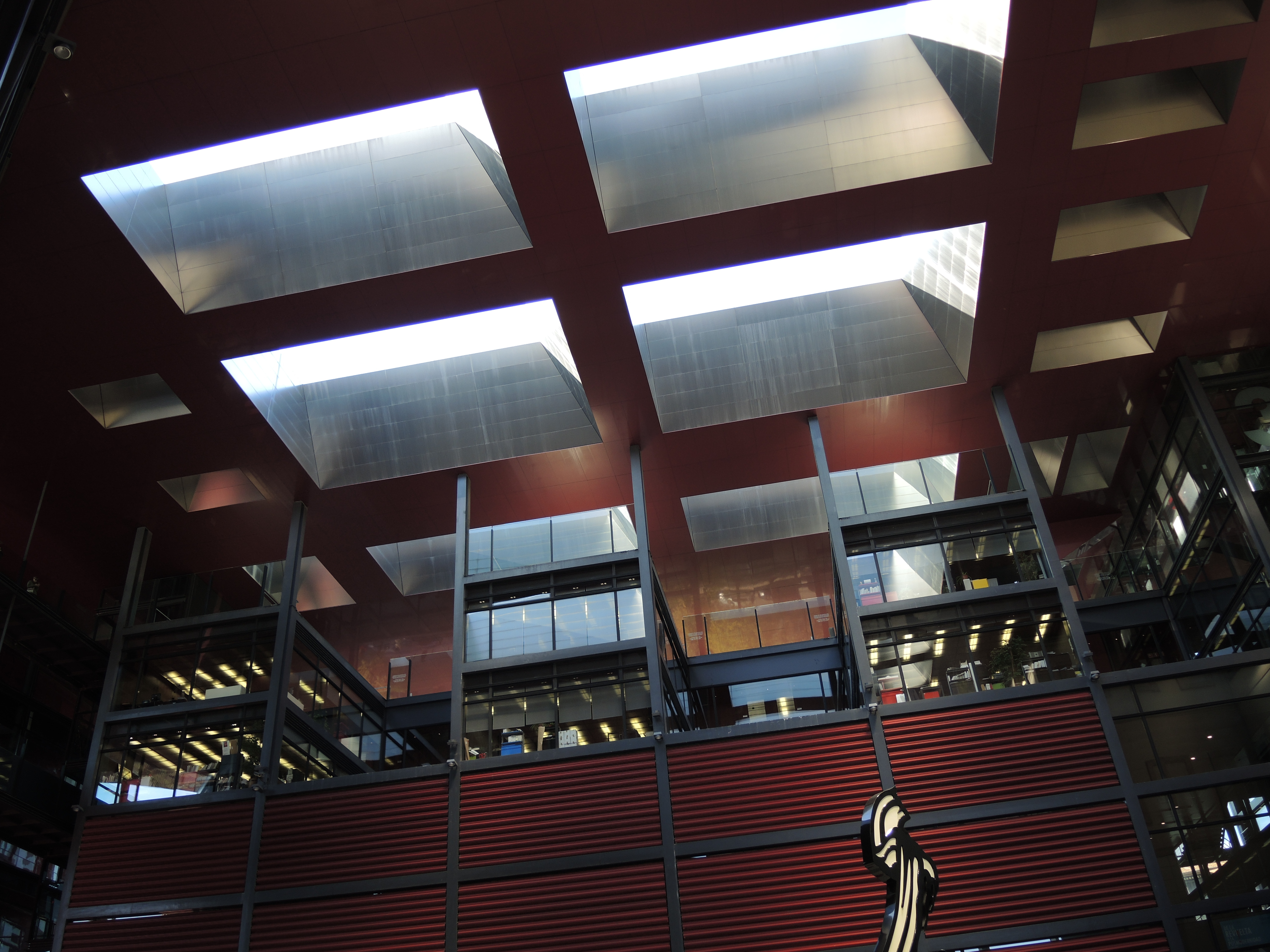
Jean Nouvel building interior

=== Hospital ===
The building is on the site of the first General Hospital of Madrid. King Philip II centralised all the hospitals that were scattered throughout the court. In the eighteenth century, King Ferdinand VI decided to build a new hospital because the facilities at the time were insufficient for the city. The building was designed by architect José de Hermosilla and his successor Francisco Sabatini who did the majority of the work. In 1805, after numerous work stoppages, the building was to assume its function that it had been built for, which was being a hospital, although only one-third of the proposed project by Sabatini was completed. Since then it has undergone various modifications and additions until, in 1969, it was closed down as a hospital.

=== Art museum ===
Extensive modern renovations and additions to the old building were made starting in 1980. The central building of the museum was once an 18th-century hospital. The building functioned as the Centro del Arte (Art Centre) from 1986 until established as the Museo Nacional Centro de Arte Reina Sofía in 1988. In 1988, portions of the new museum were opened to the public, mostly in temporary configurations; that same year it was decreed by the Ministry of Culture as a national museum. Its architectural identity was radically changed in 1989 by Ian Ritchie with the addition of three glass circulation towers. In June 2023 the art historian and curator Manuel Segade became director of the museum, succeeding Manuel Borja-Villel, who had led it for fifteen years.

=== Expansion ===
An 8000 m^{2} (86,000 ft^{2}) expansion costing €92 million designed by French architect Jean Nouvel opened in October 2005. The extension includes spaces for temporary exhibitions, an auditorium of 500 seats, and a 200-seat auditorium, a bookshop, restaurants and administration offices. Ducks Scéno was consultant for scenographic equipment of auditoriums and Arau Acustica for acoustic studies.

=== Other facilities ===
Reina Sofía exhibitions are also held at the Crystal Palace and the Velázquez Palace, both in Retiro Park.

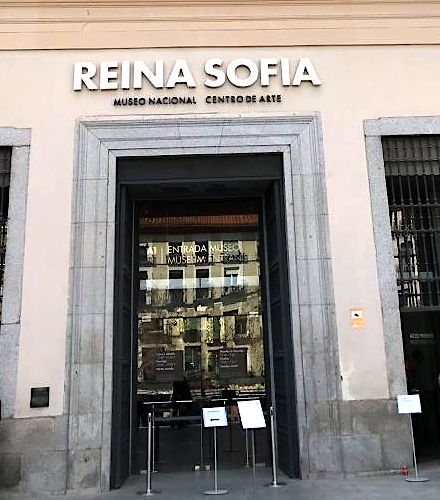
Front entrance

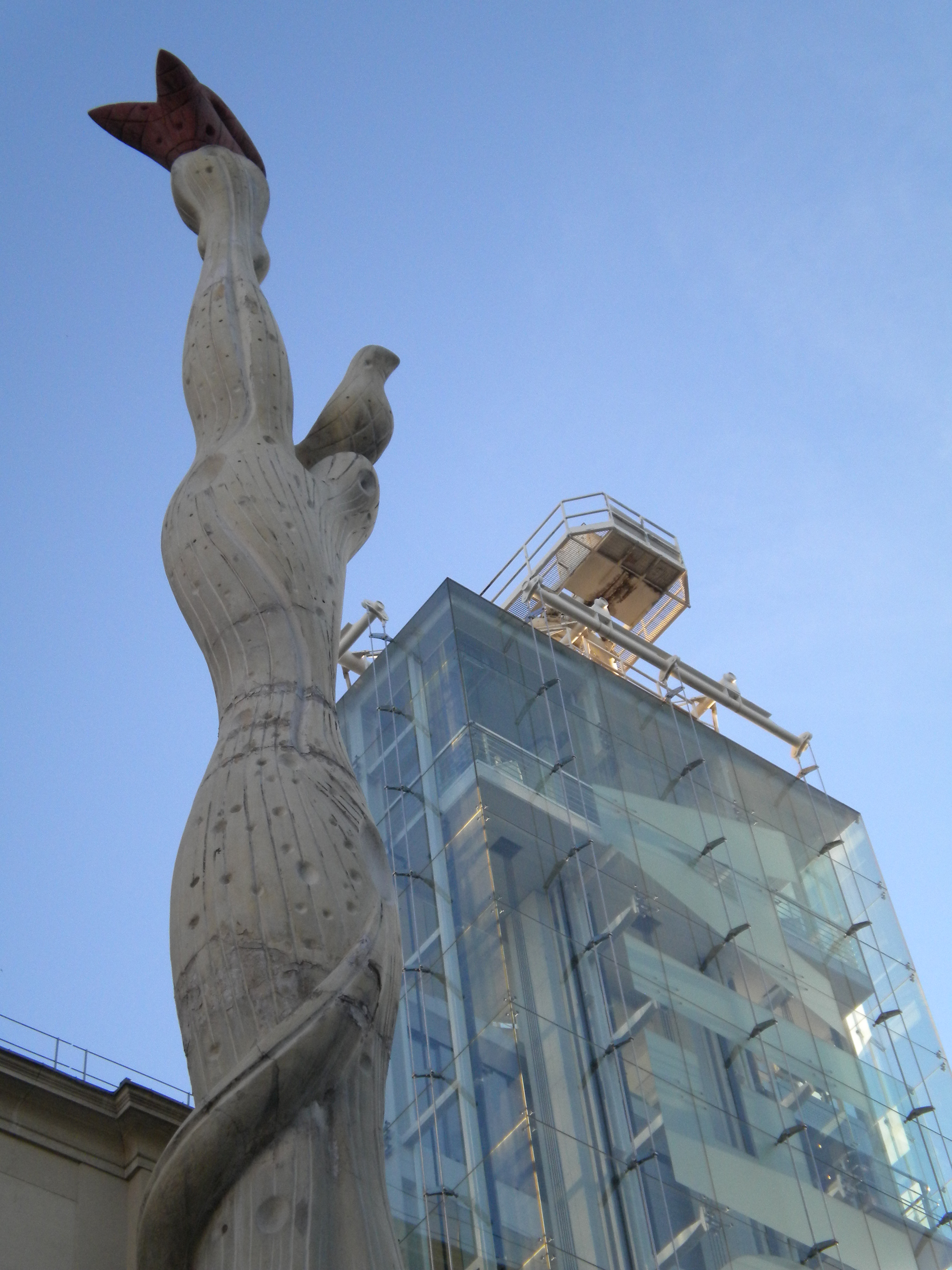
Close up of the front of the Reina Sofía in Madrid Spain.

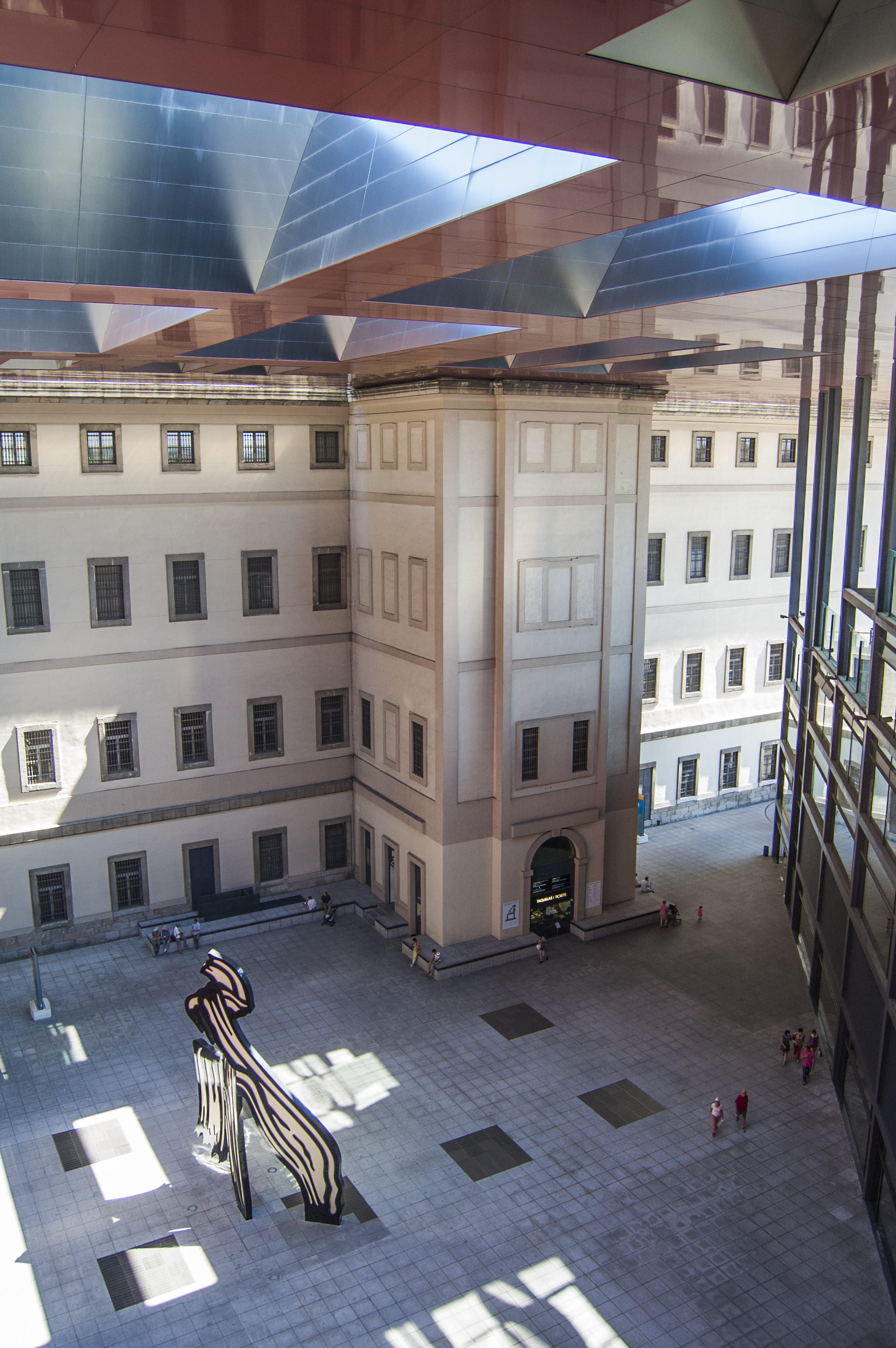
Reina Sofía Museum

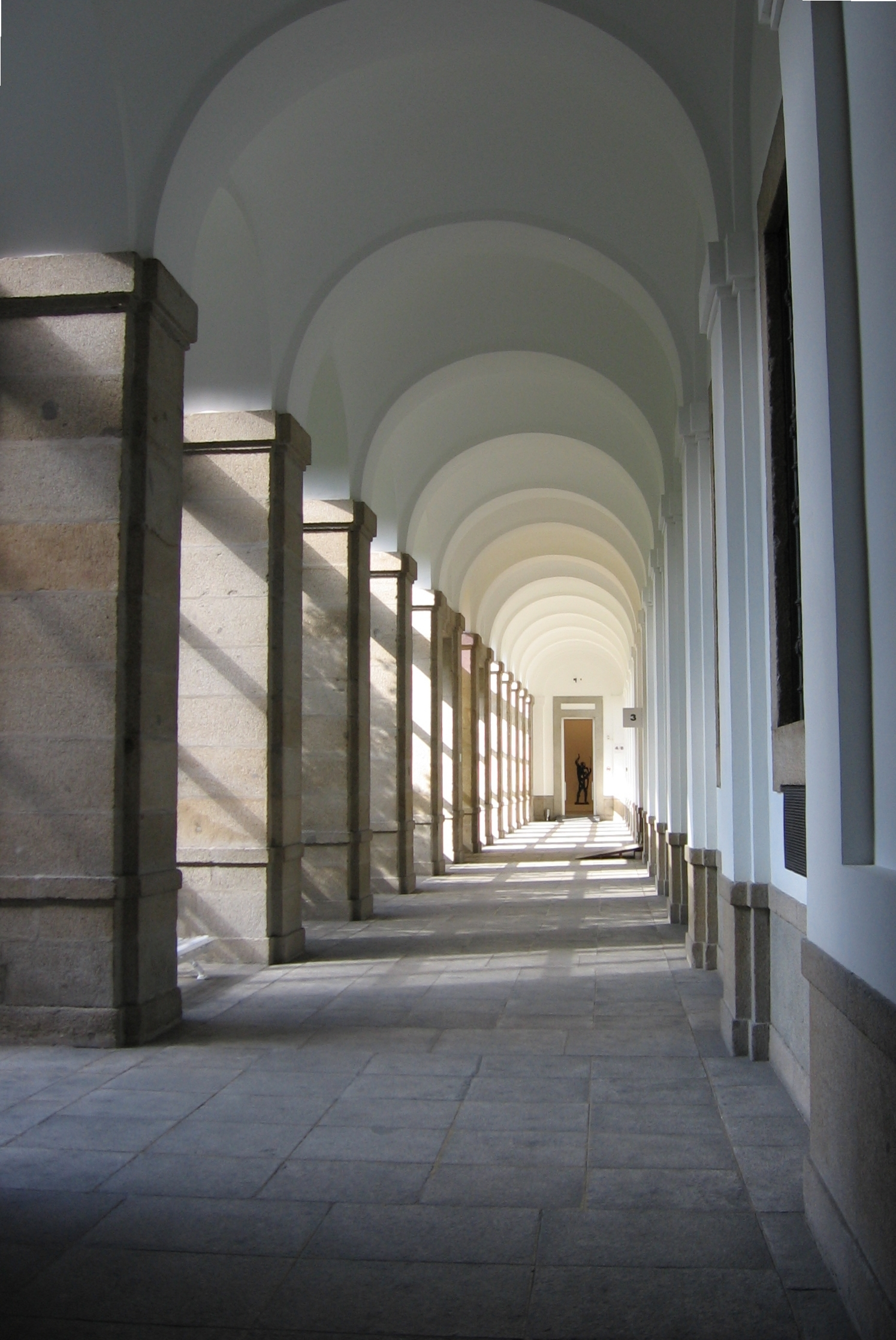
Interior gallery photo inside the Reina Sofía Museum

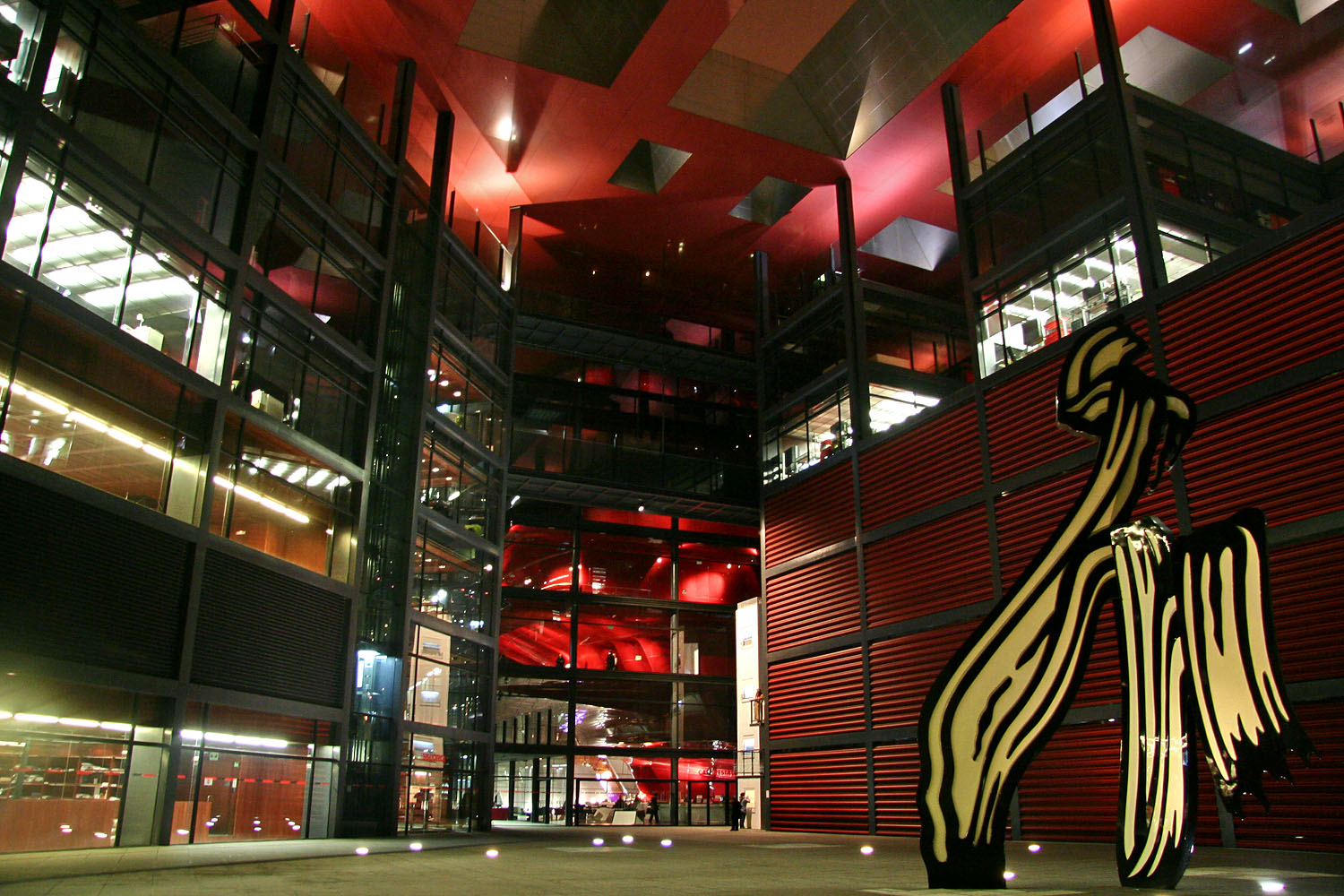
Inside the Reina Sofía Museum

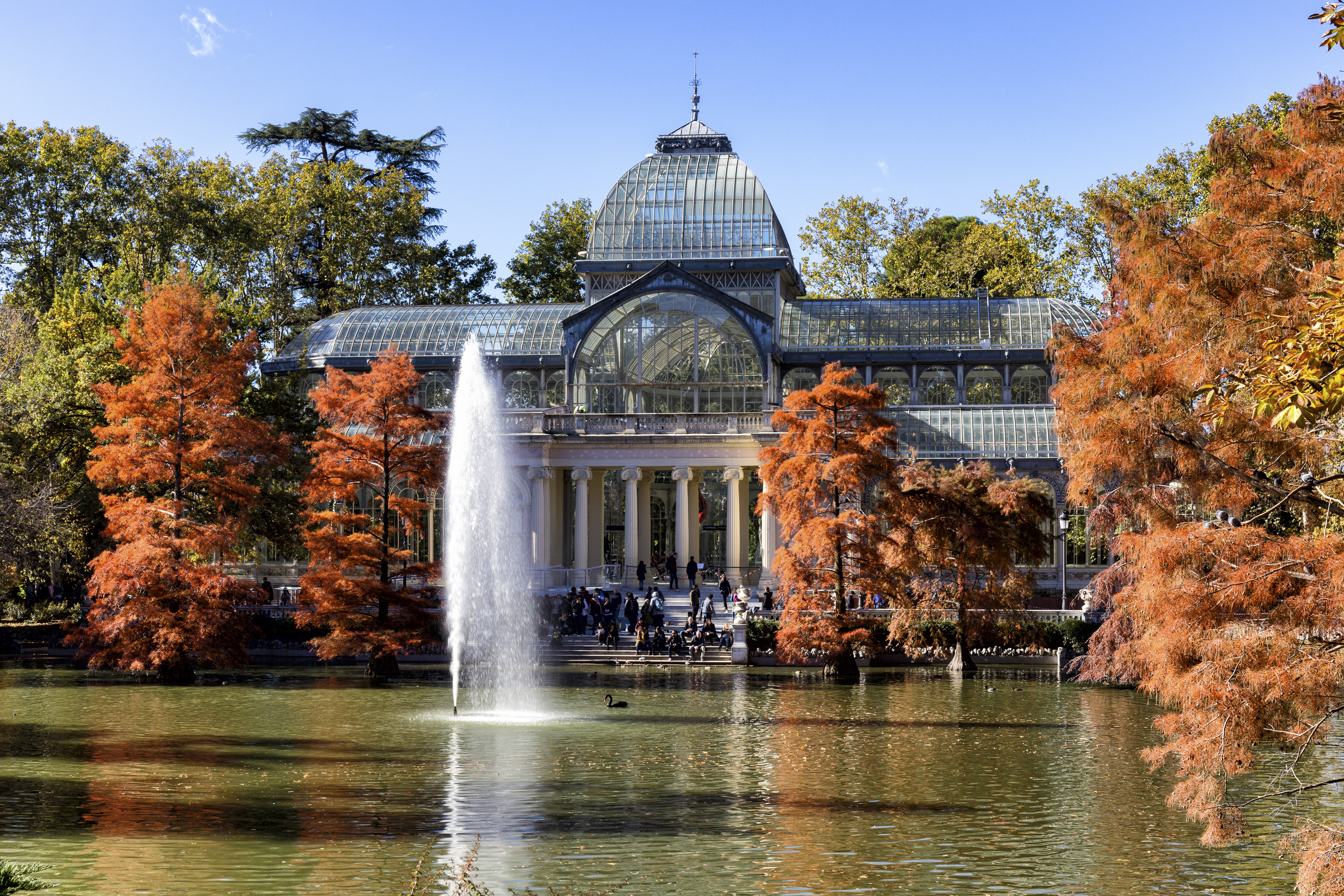
Crystal Palace in the Retiro Park, a Reina Sofía exhibition centre

== Notable works ==
- Guernica by Pablo Picasso
- The Great Masturbator by Salvador Dalí
- Equal-Parallel/Guernica-Bengasi by Richard Serra
- 6 TV Dé-Coll/age by Wolf Vostell

== Popular culture ==
The museum features, as a major location, in Jim Jarmusch's The Limits of Control (2009).

In the 2003 Spanish film Noviembre, the school entrance scenes and some performance scenes were shot in the square in front of the museum.

== See also ==
- List of largest art museums
- List of most visited art museums
- Museo de Escultura al Aire Libre de Alcalá de Henares
