= Altaria (Renfe Operadora service) =

Spanish railway service

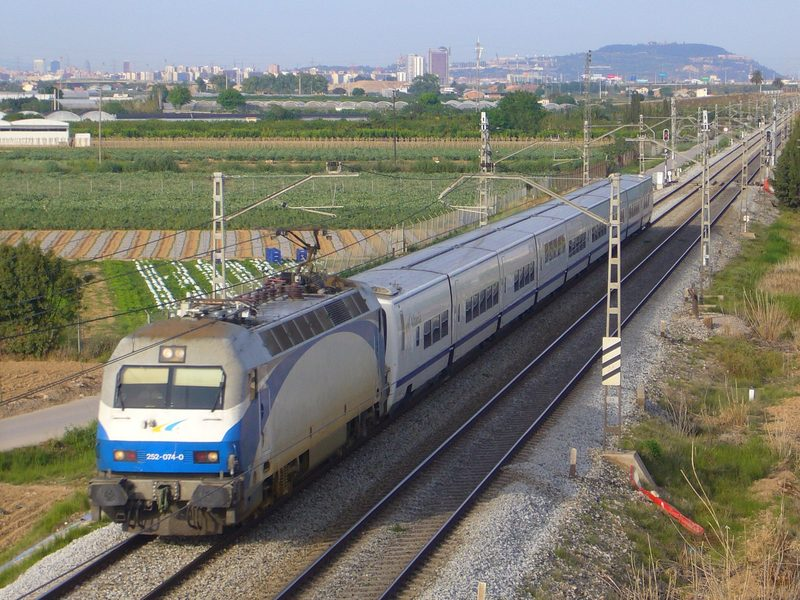
A Barcelona - Madrid Altaria train

Altaria was a brand name of a group of fast long-distance passenger railway services operated by Spanish national railway company Renfe Operadora and connecting Madrid to Algeciras, Alicante, Barcelona, Cádiz, Cartagena, Granada, Irún, Logroño, Murcia, Pamplona, and San Sebastián.

Altaria trains were composed of locomotive-hauled Talgo coaching stock equipped with gauge-changing technology which enabled the carriages to run on both conventional (1,668 mm (5 ft 5 21/32 in) Iberian gauge) track and the narrower international 1,435 mm (4 ft 8 1/2 in) standard gauge track which is used for the newer high-speed network in Spain. Altaria trains were able to achieve speeds of up to 200 km/h on the high-speed lines.

Since 22 June 2022, the brand was replaced by the InterCity services along with other Renfe brands.
