= Valdecarros (Madrid Metro) =

Madrid Metro station

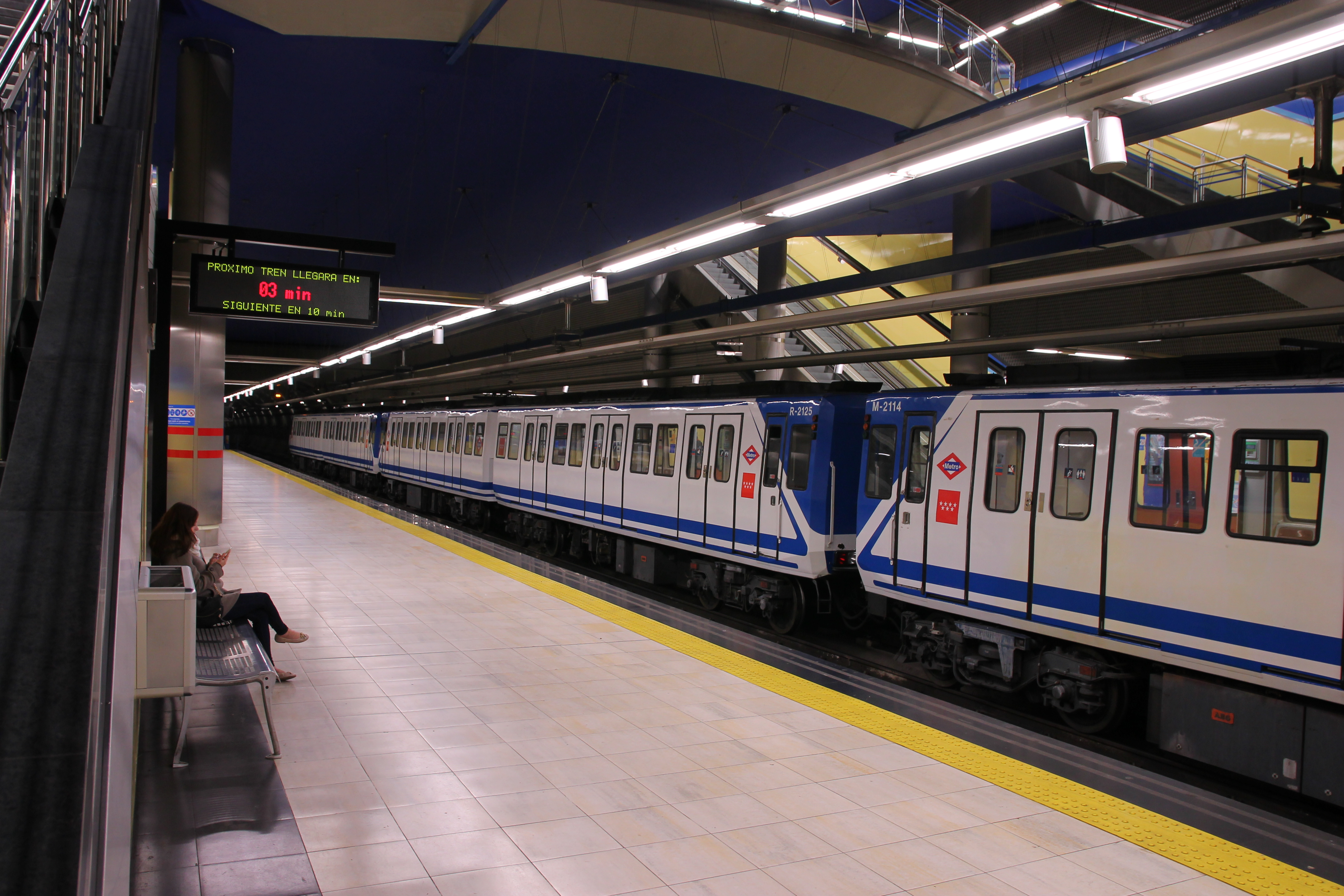
- Platform of the station

General information
- Location: Villa de Vallecas, Madrid; Spain
- Coordinates: 40.3600682°N 3.5931643°W
- System: Madrid Metro station
- Owner: CRTM
- Operator: CRTM

Construction
- Structure type: Underground
- Accessible: yes

Other information
- Fare zone: A

History
- Opened: 16 May 2007; 19 years ago

Services
Preceding station	Madrid Metro	Following station
Las Suertes towards Pinar de Chamartín	Line 1	Terminus
Location
- Location within Madrid

Valdecarros [baldeˈkaros] is a station on Line 1 of the Madrid Metro. It is located in fare Zone A. The station opened on 16 May 2007. It is named for the new Valdecarros urban development.
