= Pinar de Chamartín (Madrid Metro) =

Madrid Metro station

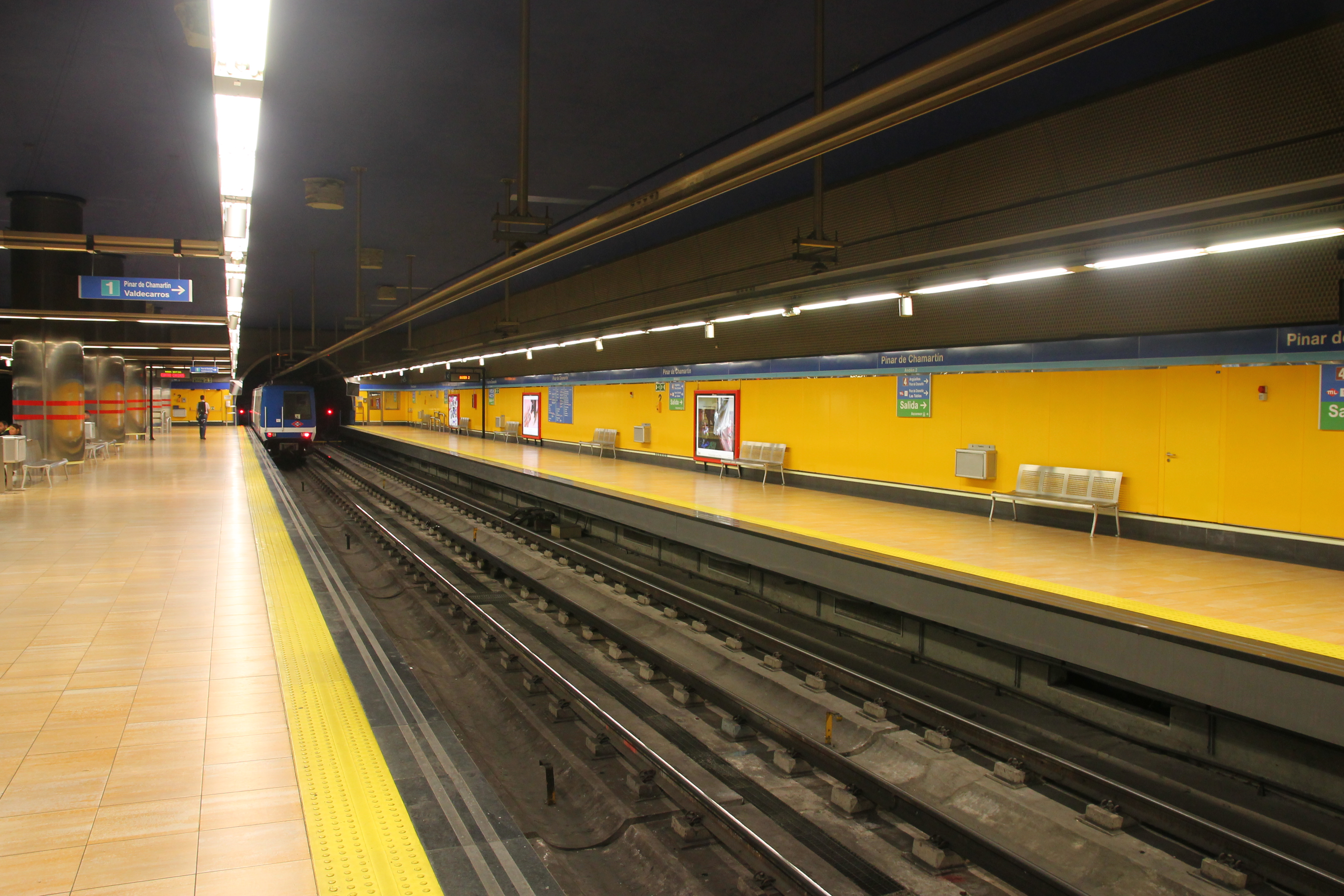
- Platforms of the station

General information
- Location: Ciudad Lineal, Madrid; Spain
- Coordinates: 40.4801375°N 3.6667999°W
- System: Madrid Metro station
- Owner: CRTM
- Operator: CRTM

Construction
- Structure type: Underground
- Accessible: Yes

Other information
- Fare zone: A

History
- Opened: 11 April 2007; 19 years ago

Services
Preceding station	Madrid Metro	Following station
Terminus	Line 1	Bambú towards Valdecarros
Manoteras towards Argüelles	Line 4	Terminus
Terminus	Line ML-1	Fuente de la Mora towards Las Tablas
Location
- Location within Madrid

Pinar de Chamartín [piˈnaɾ ðe tʃamaɾˈtin] is a station on the Madrid Metro, opened to the public on 4 November 2007. It is located in fare Zone A and serves the area of Pinar de Chamartín, in north Madrid, Spain.

The station is the terminus for Line 1, Line 4 and the Metro Ligero line 1. As Line 1 is one of the most important lines in Madrid, Line 4 serves the local area of Hortaleza, and the ML1 serves the nearby Cercanías station in the new and expanding neighborhood of Sanchinarro, the station sees a high amount of traffic for being in a relatively low-population neighborhood far removed from the city center.

The station has a single entrance located at Calle de Arturo Soria 330.

There is a tramway exhibited in the station, as a tribute to the old Madrid tramway (the new tramway system is the Metro Ligero). This tramway appears in the 1965 epic Doctor Zhivago and the neighborhood appears in the 1972 Spanish-language movie La cabina.
