= List of museums in Madrid =

This list of museums includes museums in the municipality of Madrid, the capital of Spain.

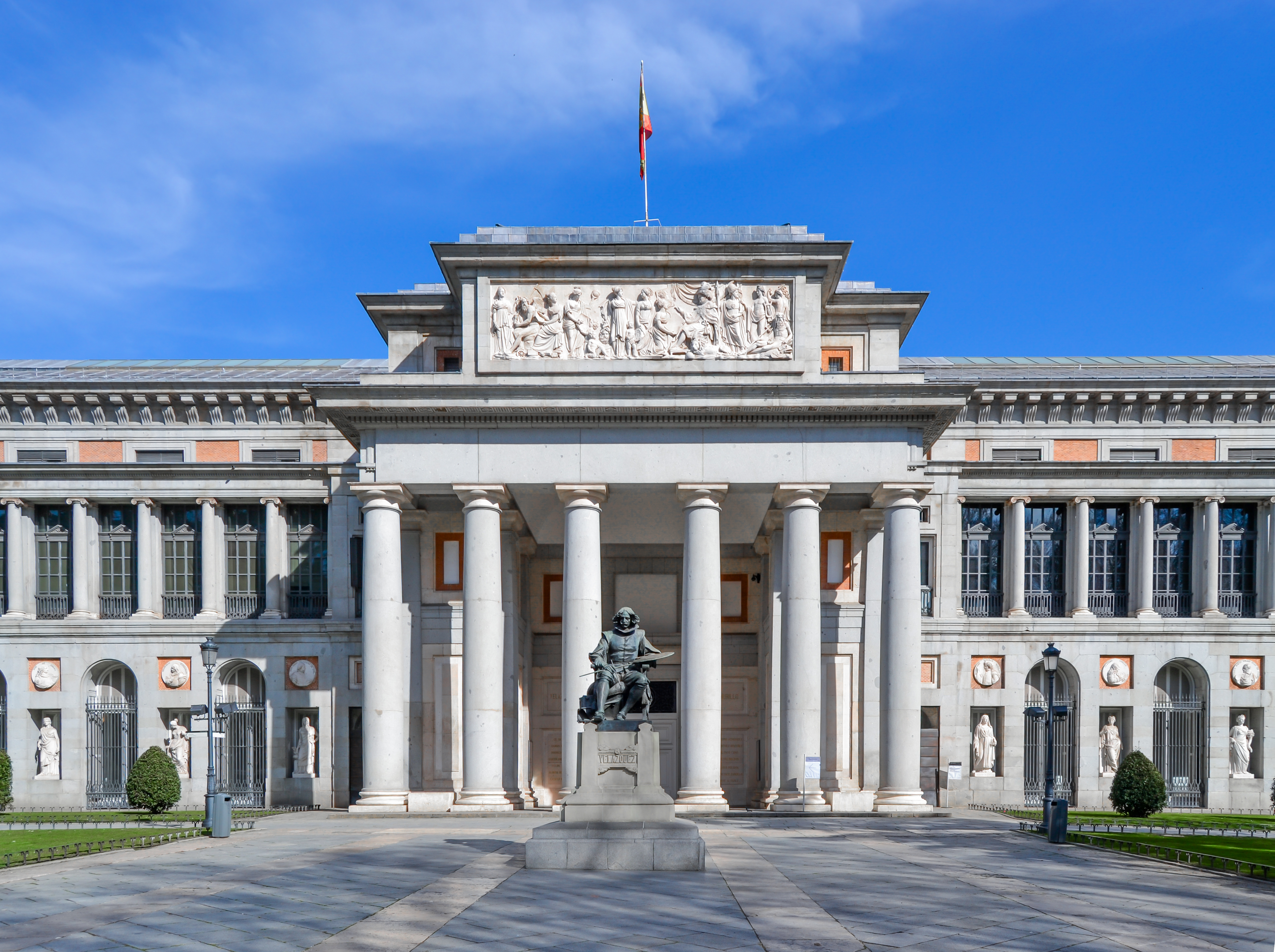
Museo del Prado

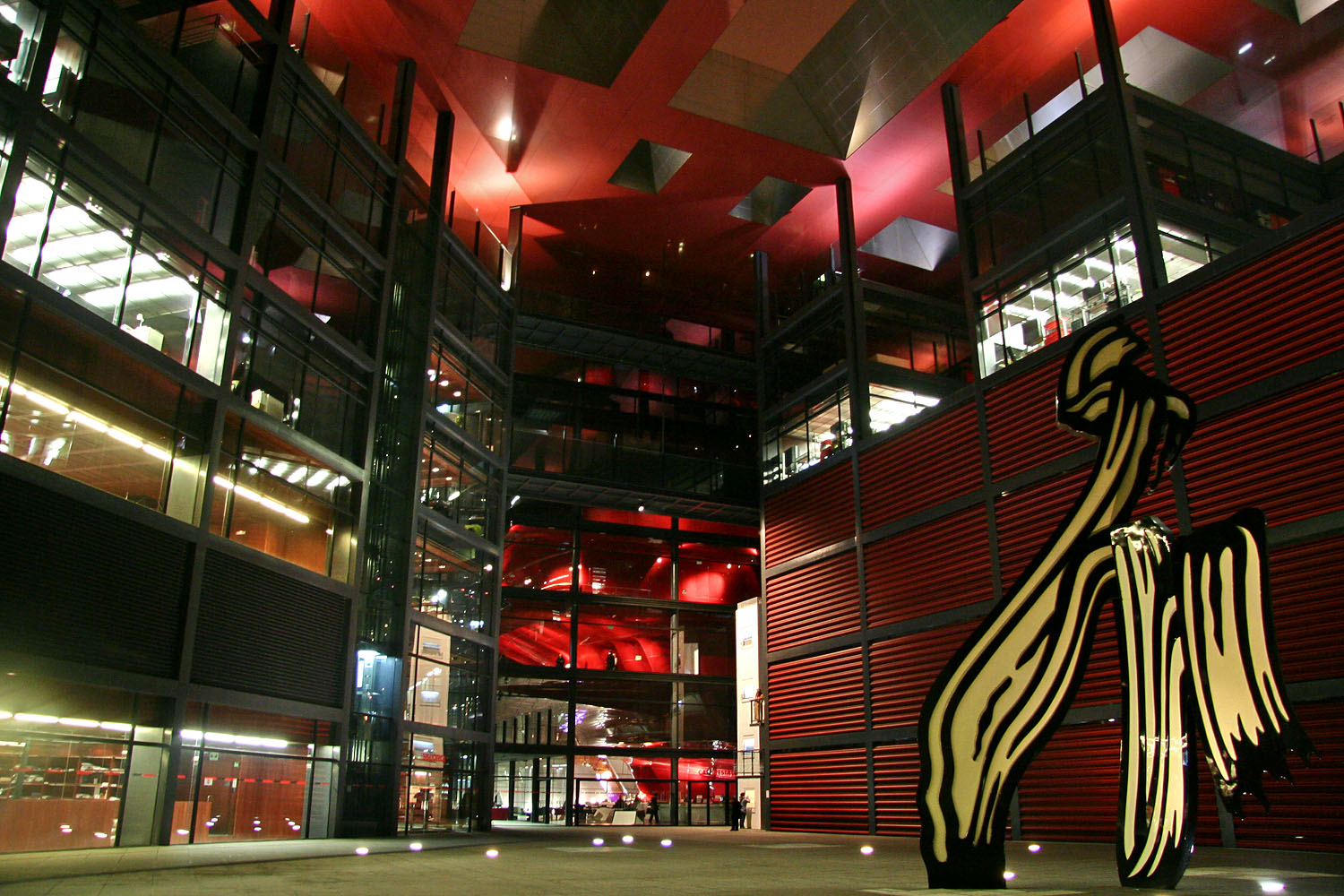
Museo Reina Sofía (MNCARS).

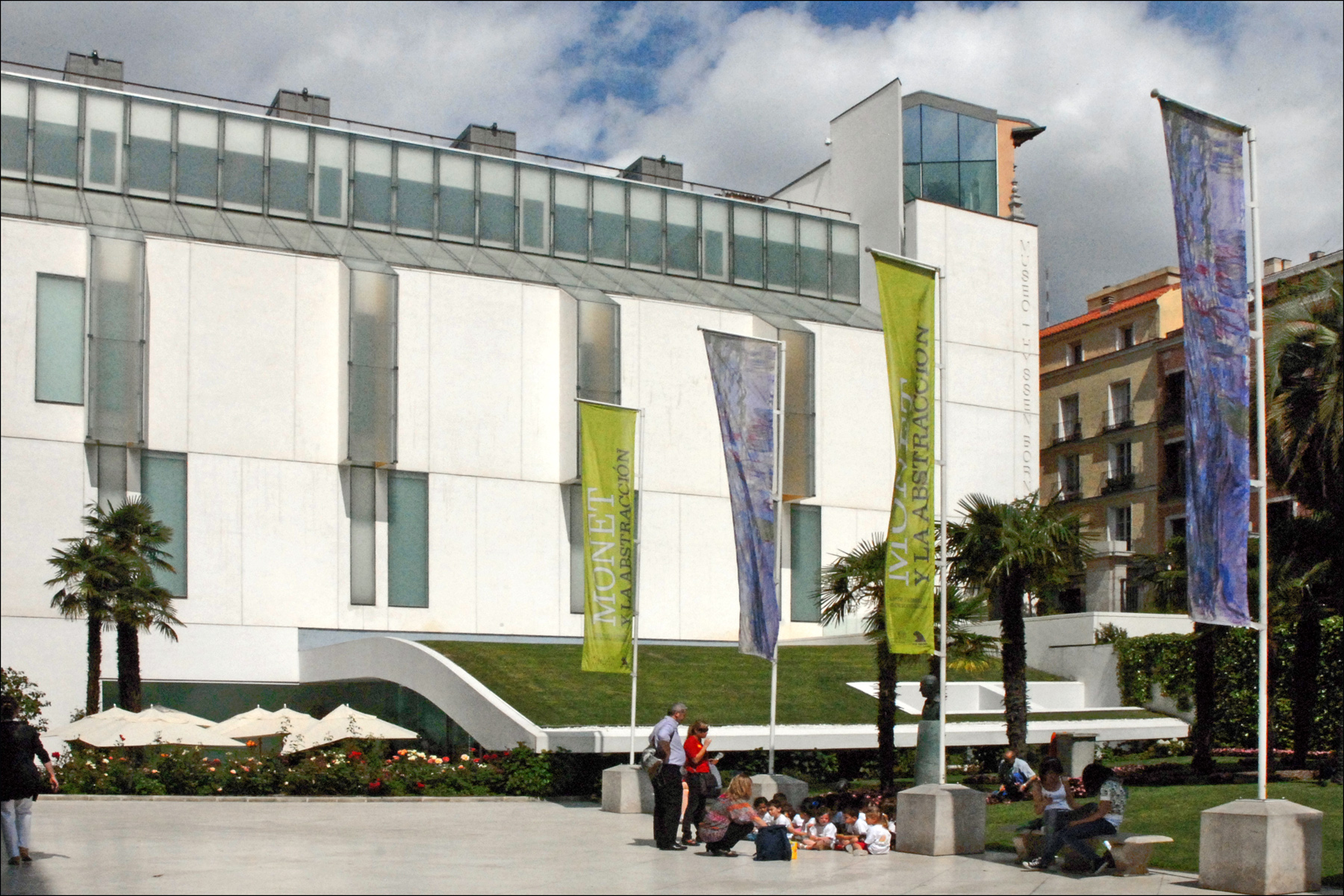
Thyssen-Bornemisza Museum

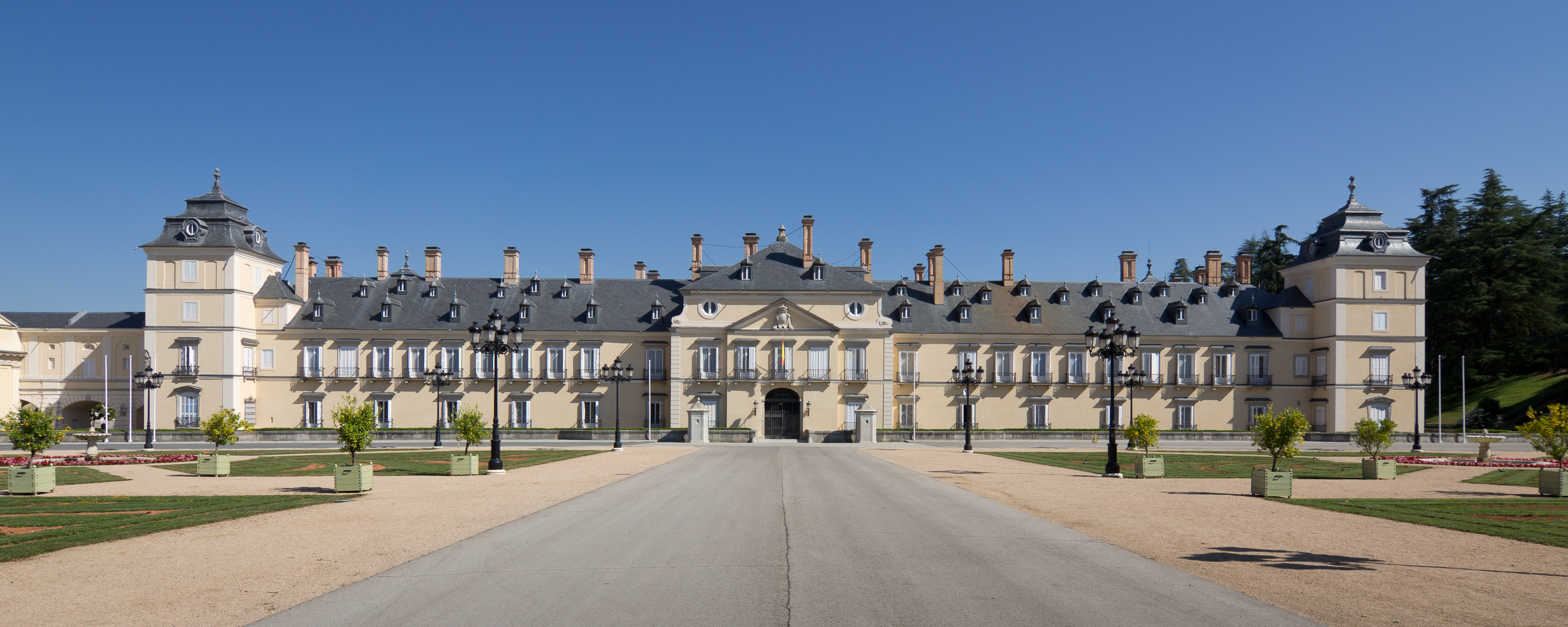
Royal Palace of El Pardo

== Art museums ==
- Museo del Prado
- Thyssen-Bornemisza Museum
- Museo Nacional Centro de Arte Reina Sofía
  - Atocha Headquarters (Sabatini and Nouvel buildings)
  - Palacio de Velázquez (Retiro Park)
  - Palacio de Cristal (Retiro Park)
- Royal Academy of Fine Arts of San Fernando Museum
- Royal Palace
- Liria Palace
- Espacio SOLO Museum
- Sorolla Museum
- Lázaro Galdiano Museum
- Cerralbo Museum
- Museum of Romanticism
- Museo Nacional de Artes Decorativas
- Museo de Arte Contemporáneo
- Museo Arte Público
- Museo ABC
- I.C.O. Museum
- Convent of Las Descalzas Reales
- Royal Monastery of La Encarnación
- Royal Chapel of St. Anthony of La Florida
- Royal Collections Gallery
- Bank of Spain [Only guided tours available, for schools, universities or cultural organisations]
- Piarist Fathers Calasanctian Museum
- House-Museum of Manuel Benedito
- Fuente del Rey House Museum
- Félix Cañada Museum

== History museums ==
- National Archaeological Museum of Spain
- Museum of the Americas
- Museo de San Isidro (History of Madrid from prehistory to the transferring of the royal court to the Village in 1561)
- Madrid History Museum (History of Madrid from 1561 to present day)
- Temple of Debod
- House-Museum of Lope de Vega
- Pantheon of Illustrious Men
- Platform 0
  - Chamberí Station
  - Pacífico Power Plant
  - Caños del Peral Museum-Ópera Station
  - Paleontological site-Carpetana Station
  - Old lobby-Pacífico Station
- Bullfighting Museum
- Museum of the History of the Jewish Community of Madrid
- Alameda Castle

== Arts and cultural centers ==
- CaixaForum Madrid
- Círculo de Bellas Artes
- Fundación Mapfre (Mapfre Foundation)
  - Bárbara de Braganza Hall
  - Recoletos Hall
- Fundación Juan March (Juan March Foundation)
- La Casa Encendida
- Matadero Madrid Cultural Center
  - Abierto X Obras
  - Casa del Lector
  - Central de Diseño
  - Extensión AVAM
  - Naves Matadero-International Living Arts Centre
- Centro Cultural Conde Duque Cultural Center
- Centro Centro Cultural Center
- Centro de Arte Canal (Canal Art Center)
- Fundación Canal (Canal Foundation)
- Art Rooms of the Autonomous Community of Madrid
  - Alcalá 31 Room
  - Canal de Isabel II Room [Temporarily closed until 28th of May]
  - Youth Art Room
- El Águila Room (Regional Library of Madrid and Regional Archives of Madrid)
- Marqués de Valdecilla Historical Library-Complutense University
- Espacio Fundación Telefónica
- Fernán Gómez (Centro Cultural de la Villa)
- Cervantes Institute
  - Caryatid Building (Madrid)
  - Colegio del Rey (Alcalá de Henares)
- Casa de América
- Casa Árabe
- Centro Sefarad-Israel
- Casa de México
- Mexican Cultural Institute (Embassy of Mexico)
- Korean Cultural Center
- Carlos de Amberes Foundation
- Athenæum of Madrid
- Residencia de Estudiantes [not open for general viewing]
- Centro Arte Complutense (c arte c)
- María Cristina Masaveu Peterson Foundation
- Gaviria Palace
- Casa de las Alhajas
- Francisco Giner de los Ríos Foundation
- LASEDE (Official Professional Association of Architects of Madrid)
- La Neomudéjar Avant-garde Arts Center, Museum and International Artistic Residence -self-managed- (C.A.V., Museo y Residencia Artística Internacional "La Neomudéjar" -autogestionado-)
  - La Neomudéjar (Atocha)
  - Zapadores City of Art (Fuencarral)
- PHotoEspaña Gallery
- Fundación BBVA
- ICO Museum
- Sala Alcalá 31

== Anthropology museums ==
- Museo Nacional de Antropología
- Museo Africano Mundo Negro
- El Caserón Ethnographic Museum (San Sebastián de los Reyes)

== Science museums ==
- Royal Observatory of Madrid
- Museo Nacional de Ciencias Naturales
- Museo Geominero
- National Museum of Science and Technology
  - Alcobendas center (collection and exhibitions)
  - Madrid center (library, archive and warehouse)
- Royal Botanical Garden
- Madrid Planetarium
- Technological collection of Telefónica
- National Royal Academy of Pharmacy Museum
- Infanta Margarita Medicine Museum

== Miscellaneous ==
- Museo Naval de Madrid
- Museo del Traje
- Railway Museum
- EMT Museum
- Fire Museum
- National Library of Spain Museum
- La Almudena Cathedral Museum
- Royal Tapestry Factory
- Museo Casa de la Moneda (Madrid) (House of Coins Museum)
- Imprenta Municipal-Artes del Libro
- Royal Conservatory Museum
- Museo del Aire
- Infante de Orleans Foundation (Historical Airplanes in Flight Museum)
- Guardia Civil Museum
- MUMA Museum of Tanks
- Eduardo Torroja Museum
- Insurance Museum (‘Museo del Seguro’)
- Wax Museum of Madrid
- Tiflológico Museum
- El Capricho Park
- Real Madrid Museum (Santiago Bernabéu Stadium)
- Atlético Madrid Museum (Metropolitano Stadium)
- Legends: The Home of Football
- Casa Museo Ratón Pérez
- Museum of Illusions

== University museums ==
- Alfonso XIII Royal Botanical Garden (UCM)
- Javier Puerta Museum of Anatomy (UCM)
- Museum of Comparative Anatomy of Vertebrate Animals (UCM)
- Museum of American Archaeology and Ethnology (UCM)
- Museum of Astronomy and Geodesy (UCM)
- Museum of Entomology (UCM)
- Hispanic Pharmacy Museum (UCM)
- Museum of Geology (UCM)
- Museum of Dentistry "Luis de Macorra" (UCM)
- Complutense Optical Museum (UCM)
- Pedagogical Textile Museum (UCM)
- Complutense Veterinarian Museum (UCM)
- Museum of Medical and Forensic Anthropology, Paleopathology and Criminalistics (UCM)
- Laboratory Museum of History of Education (UCM)
- Computer Museum García Santesmases (UCM)
- Pedagogical Museum of Children Art (UCM)
- Olavide Museum (UCM)
- Joaquín Serna Museum (UPM)
- Torres Quevedo Museum (UPM)
- Museum of Agronomy (UPM)
- Museum of Applied Geology (UPM)
- Museum of topographical instruments (UPM)
- Museum of telecommunications (UPM)
- INEF (National Institute for Physical Education) Museum (UPM)
- "Felipe de Borbón y Grecia" Museum of Mining History (UPM)
- Technological Museum (UPM)
- Museum of Arts and Popular Traditions (UAM)
- Museum Mineralogy Museum] (UAM)
- Museum of the School of Engineering (UAM)

== Defunct museums ==
- Carriage Museum
- Espacio Tabacalera [Temporarily Closed]
  - Tabacalera Espacio Promoción del Arte, managed by the Fine Arts Promotion Sub-Department of the Spanish Education, Culture and Sport Ministry
  - Self-managed Social Center La Tabacalera de Lavapiés (Centro Social Autogestionado La Tabacalera de Lavapiés)
- Museum of Health and Public Hygiene at the Charmartin campus of the Carlos III Health Institute [Temporarily Closed]
- Postal and Telegraph Museum [Temporarily closed]

== See also ==
- List of museums in Barcelona
- List of museums in Málaga
- List of museums in Spain
