= Bachiller =

Bachiller is a Spanish surname. Notable people with the surname include:

- Ángela Bachiller, Spanish city councillor for Valladolid
- Antonio Bachiller y Morales (1812–1889), Cuban lawyer, historian, and bibliographer
- Carlos Giménez Bachiller (born 2003), Spanish footballer
- Cesáreo Bachiller (1914–2004) was a Spanish footballer
- Iker Bachiller (born 2002), Spanish footballer
- Rafael Bachiller (born 1957), Spanish astronomer and science communicator
