= Royal Observatory of Madrid =

Coordinates: 40.4084°N 3.6876°W

Royal Observatory
- Real Observatorio de Madrid (Spanish)
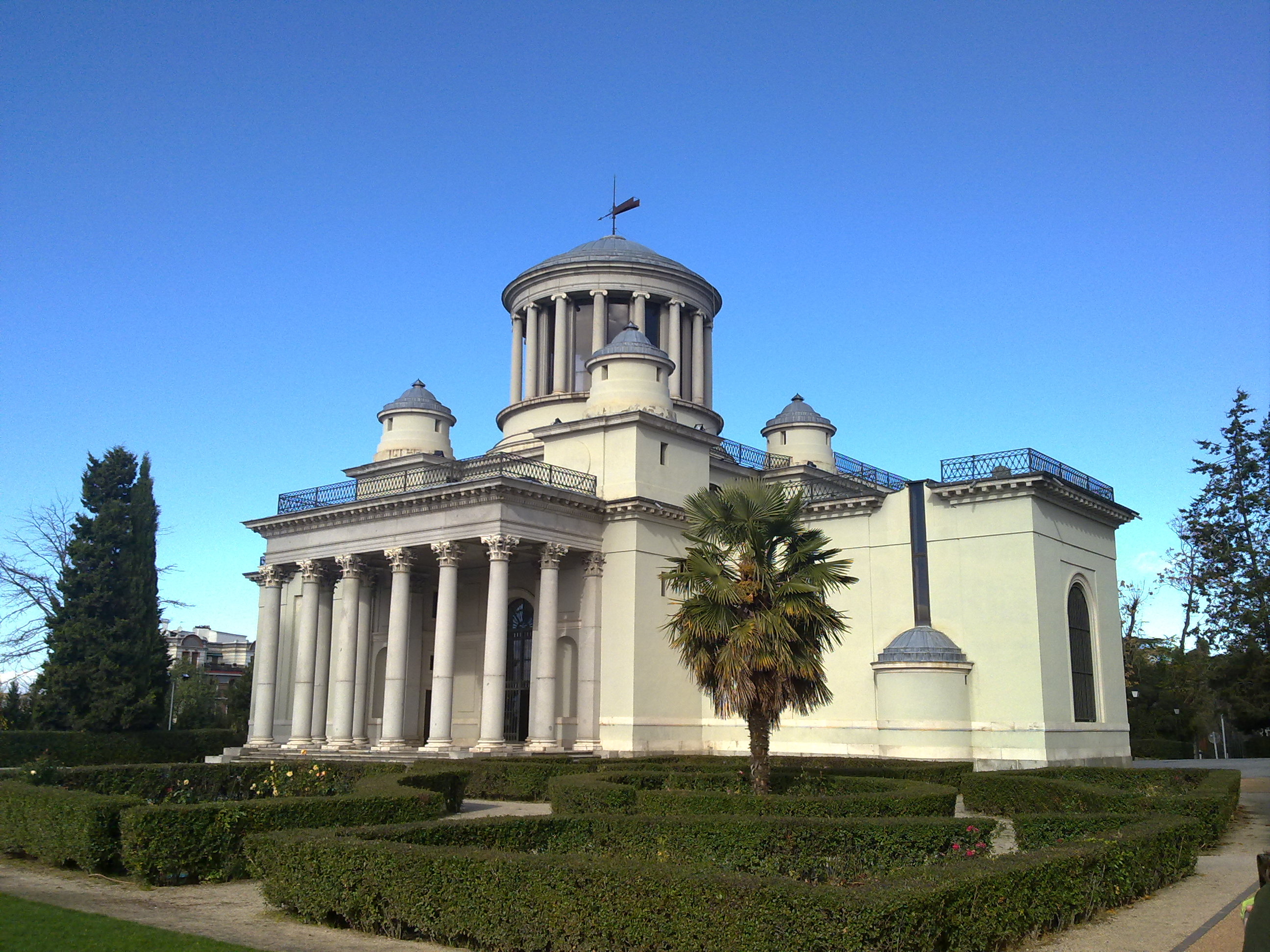

- Location within Spain
- Location: Madrid, Spain

Site notes
- Governing body: Instituto Geográfico Nacional (Spain)

Spanish Cultural Heritage
- Official name: Real Observatorio de Madrid
- Type: Non-movable
- Criteria: Monument
- Designated: 1995
- Reference no.: RI-51-0009078

The Royal Observatory of Madrid is a historic observatory situated on a small hill next to the Buen Retiro Park in Madrid, Spain. It was founded in 1790 and has been engaged in continuous scientific activity since then. It is currently the seat of the Spanish National Observatory and an active research group in geophysics, both belonging to the National Geographic Institute.

In addition to its architectural value, the Observatory treasures an important collection of historical instruments, as well as bibliographic and documentary collections. Since 2002, Rafael Bachiller is the director of the Royal Observatory of Madrid. In 2021, the Observatory entered the UNESCO World Heritage List as part of the so-called Paisaje de la Luz.

== History ==
In the 18th century, the scientist and naval officer Jorge Juan proposed to Charles III to create an astronomical observatory in Madrid. This became part of a more ambitious project of an urban axis devoted to science, which included the Museo Nacional del Prado (initially planned as Natural Science Museum and Academy of Sciences), the Real Jardín Botánico and the Royal Astronomical Observatory. This is a prime example of the Age of Enlightenment in Spain, as part of an urban planning combining science and neoclassical architecture.

During the Peninsular War, which began in 1808, Napoleon's troops invaded the Observatory premises and settled there. Villanueva's building, which was practically finished in 1808, was badly deteriorated as a consequence of the war. In addition, the French soldiers destroyed William Herschel's 25-foot telescope, one of the largest telescopes in the world back then.

After the Peninsular War, the Observatory underwent a period of decadence until its refoundation in the middle of the 19th century under the reign of Isabella II. At this time, a first restoration of the Villanueva building was commissioned to the architect Narciso Pascual Colomer. It was also at this point that a large meridian circle was installed in the east wing of the Villanueva building. This telescope was used for over a hundred years to determine the official time in Spain.

During the 19th and 20th centuries new buildings were added to the premises of the Royal Observatory of Madrid, including a museum. In the beginning of the 20th century, a full-size replica of the 25-foot Herschel telescope was constructed.

== Architecture ==
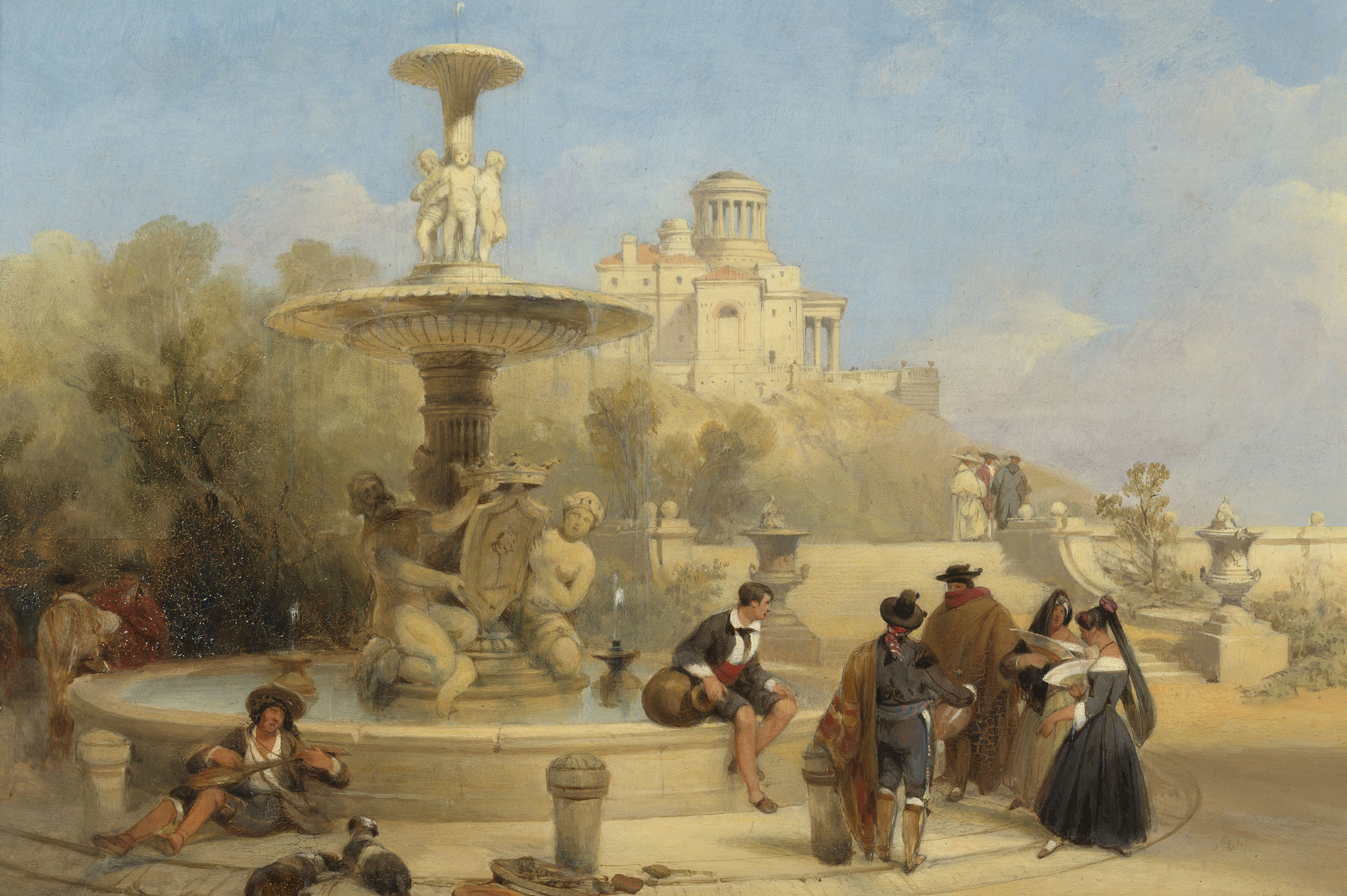
The Fountain on the Prado, Madrid by David Roberts, 1841. The Observatory is prominent in the background

The observatory was designed by Juan de Villanueva, architect to Charles III of Spain. It represents one of the highlights of Spanish neoclassical architecture. Its domed lantern was conceived as a classical circular temple.

The building is highly symmetric, with a slender portico which defines the main facade, with columns topped with capitals of the Corinthian order. At the top of the building, four small domes flank a large lantern that crowns the building, surrounded by sixteen columns, this time of the Ionic order. The building underwent a restoration in the mid-19th century by Pascual Colomer, who decided to add the two small domes next to the lantern in the side facing the portico. In the 1970s, Antonio Fernández Alba carried out a full restoration of the Villanueva building, for which he won the National Restoration Award in 1980.

== Equipment ==
Shortly after construction, the observatory was equipped with a 25-foot reflecting telescope by William Herschel. The instrument was dismantled in the Peninsular War and only partially survived. It has been reconstructed in recent years.

== Current use ==
Madrid is affected by light pollution and is not a good location for optical astronomy. Conditions are much better in other parts of Spanish territory, notably the Canary Islands, the second-best location for optical and infrared astronomy in the Northern Hemisphere, after Mauna Kea Observatory, Hawaii. The astronomers currently working at the Observatory collect and analyse data from telescopes across the world, as well as from space telescopes.

The observatory can be viewed by prior arrangement. The scientific equipment on display includes two original 7-foot telescopes constructed by William Herschel, the reconstructed 25-foot Herschel Telescope, a Foucault pendulum, and the 4-metre ruler that was used to perform fundamental geodetic triangulation in Spain in the 19th century. The visit also takes in the library which is housed in the Villanueva building.

== See also ==
- Spanish National Observatory
- List of museums in Madrid
