= 1644 Rafita =

Main-belt asteroid

Discovery
- Discovered by: R. Carrasco
- Discovery site: Madrid Obs.
- Discovery date: 16 December 1935

Designations
- Named after: Rafael Carrasco (discoverer's son)
- Alternative designations: 1935 YA · 1939 XA; 1941 JB · 1949 JC; 1951 VF · 1955 TS; 1957 GD · 1959 UD; A906 RB · A916 BA
- Minor planet category: main-belt · (middle); Rafita-interloper

Orbital characteristics
- Epoch 4 September 2017 (JD 2458000.5)
- Uncertainty parameter 0
- Observation arc: 110.53 yr (40,371 days)
- Aphelion: 2.9426 AU
- Perihelion: 2.1539 AU
- Semi-major axis: 2.5483 AU
- Eccentricity: 0.1548
- Orbital period (sidereal): 4.07 yr (1,486 days)
- Mean anomaly: 13.784°
- Mean motion: 0° 14^{m} 32.28^{s} / day
- Inclination: 7.0193°
- Longitude of ascending node: 270.90°
- Argument of perihelion: 197.05°

Physical characteristics
- Dimensions: 13.958±0.157 km 15.405±0.072 km 15.48 km (taken); 15.482 km 17.69±1.08 km
- Synodic rotation period: 5.100±0.002 h 6.800±0.004 h
- Geometric albedo: 0.106±0.014; 0.1329; 0.1403±0.0148; 0.164±0.028
- Spectral type: Tholen = S B–V = 0.867; U–B = 0.404
- Absolute magnitude (H): 11.82 · 11.82±0.21 · 11.86±0.02

1644 Rafita, provisional designation 1935 YA, is a stony asteroid from the middle region of the asteroid belt, approximately 15 kilometers in diameter. It is the namesake of the Rafita family, a family of stony asteroids in the intermediate main-belt. However, Rafita is a suspected interloper in its own family. It was discovered on 16 December 1935, by Spanish astronomer Rafael Carrasco Garrorena at the Royal Observatorio Astronómico de Madrid in Spain, and named in memory of the discoverer's son.

== Orbit and classification ==
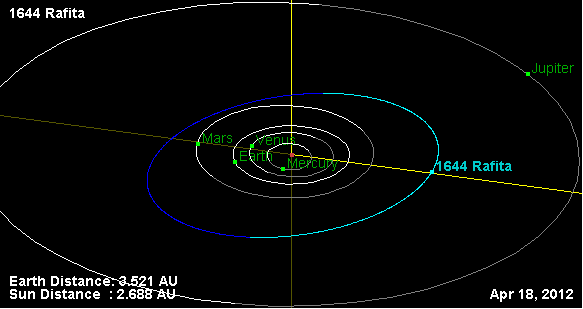
Orbit

Rafita asteroid orbits the Sun in the central main-belt at a distance of 2.2–2.9 AU once every 4 years and 1 month (1,486 days). Its orbit has an eccentricity of 0.15 and an inclination of 7° with respect to the ecliptic. Rafita was first observed as A906 RB at Heidelberg Observatory in 1906, extending the body's observation arc by 29 years prior to its official discovery observation.

== Lightcurves ==
Rafita's first rotational lightcurve was obtained by American astronomer Alan Harris of JPL in January 1981. It gave a rotation period of 5.100 hours with a brightness variation of 0.31 magnitude (U=2). Photometric observations by French amateur astronomer Laurent Bernasconi in December 2004, gave a period of 6.800 hours and an amplitude of 0.13 magnitude (U=2).

== Diameter and albedo ==
According to the surveys carried out by the Japanese Akari satellite and NASA's Wide-field Infrared Survey Explorer with its subsequent NEOWISE mission, Rafita measures between 13.96 and 17.69 kilometers in diameter, and its surface has an albedo between 0.106 and 0.164. The Collaborative Asteroid Lightcurve Link agrees with Petr Pravec's revised WISE-results, that is an albedo of 0.1329 and a diameter of 15.482 kilometers, based on an absolute magnitude of 11.86.

== Naming ==
This minor planet was named by the discoverer in honor of his late son, Rafael Carrasco. The official naming citation was published by the Minor Planet Center on 30 January 1964 (M.P.C. 2277).
