= National Astronomical Observatory =

National Astronomical Observatory may refer to:

- National Astronomical Observatory (Chile)
- National Astronomical Observatories of China
- National Astronomical Observatory (Colombia), astronomical observatory in Bogotá
- National Astronomical Observatory of Japan, in Mitaka
- National Astronomical Observatory (Mexico), first in Mexico City; then in Tonantzintla, Puebla; now in Sierra San Pedro Mártir, Baja California
- National Astronomical Observatory (Spain), in Madrid

== See also ==
- List of astronomical observatories
