= Wax Museum of Madrid =

Coordinates: 40°25′28″N 3°41′29″W

The Madrid Wax Museum
- Museo de cera de Madrid
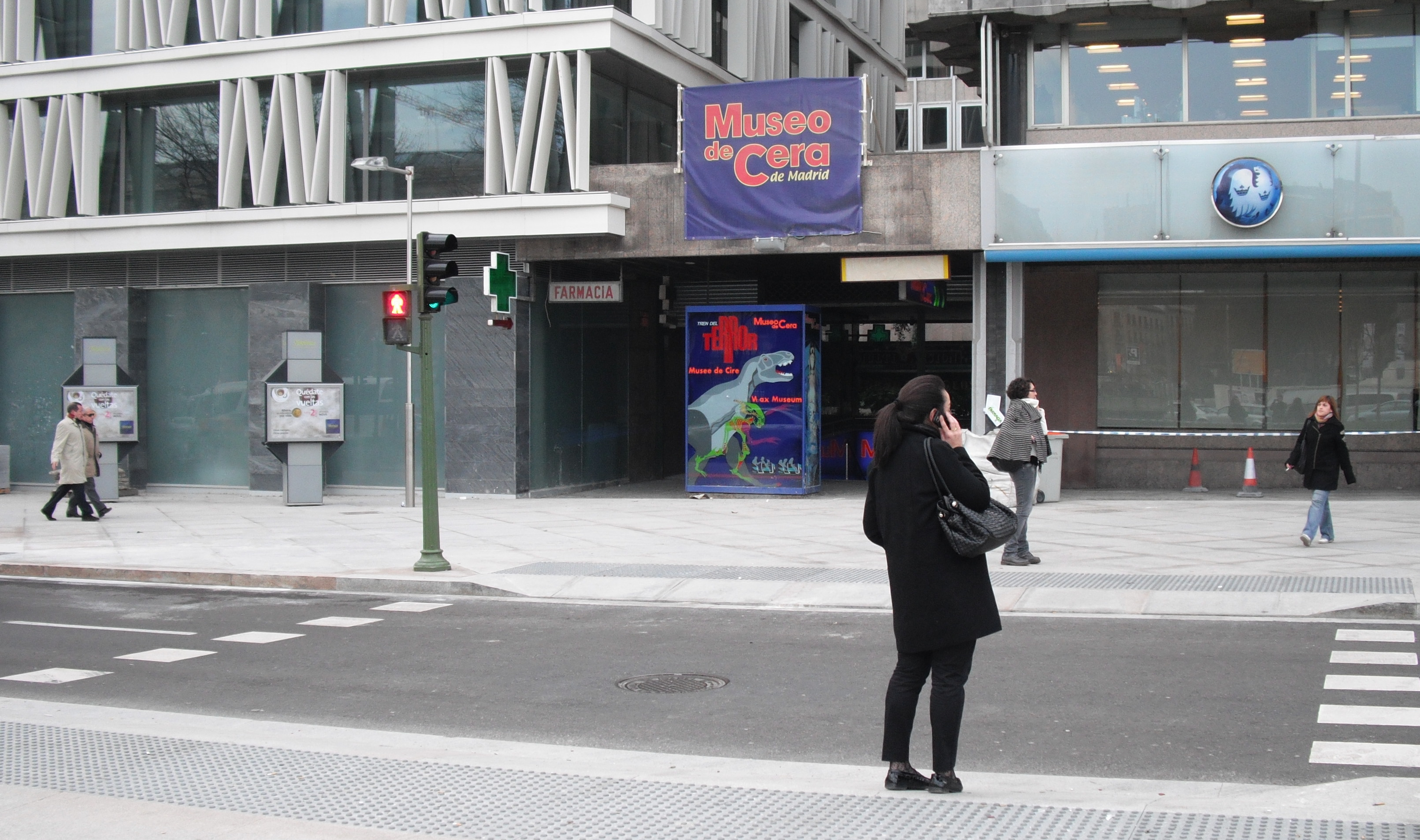
- View of the museum from Paseo de Recoletos
- Established: 1972
- Location: Paseo de Recoletos, 41 28004, Madrid, Spain
- Type: Wax museum
- Public transit access: Colón
- Website: Museum Website

The Madrid Wax Museum (Spanish: Museo de cera de Madrid) is a wax museum located in Plaza de Colón in Madrid, Spain.

== History ==
The museum opened on 14 February 1972.

== Contents ==
The museum has over 450 wax figures, mostly in scenes. It contains Spanish and international figures, as well as fictional characters. More recent additions to the museum include Hollywood actors, American cowboys, famous athletes, the Pope, and Donald and Melania Trump.

The second floor of the museum has a cinema that uses 27 projectors simultaneously to show the history of Spain.

== Collection ==
The museum has placed special interest in reflecting the children's world with the presence of the Simpson Family, Harry Potter, Mortadelo y Filemón and Snow White, as well as Frodo from The Lord of the Rings.

The museum also has three attractions: the simulator that consists of icy tunnels, the center of the Earth, and space; the terror train, which transports the visitor to the Jurassic park, the Galactic Tavern, passing through famous murders and other surprises; and finally Multivision that offers a vision of the History of Spain.

== Gallery ==
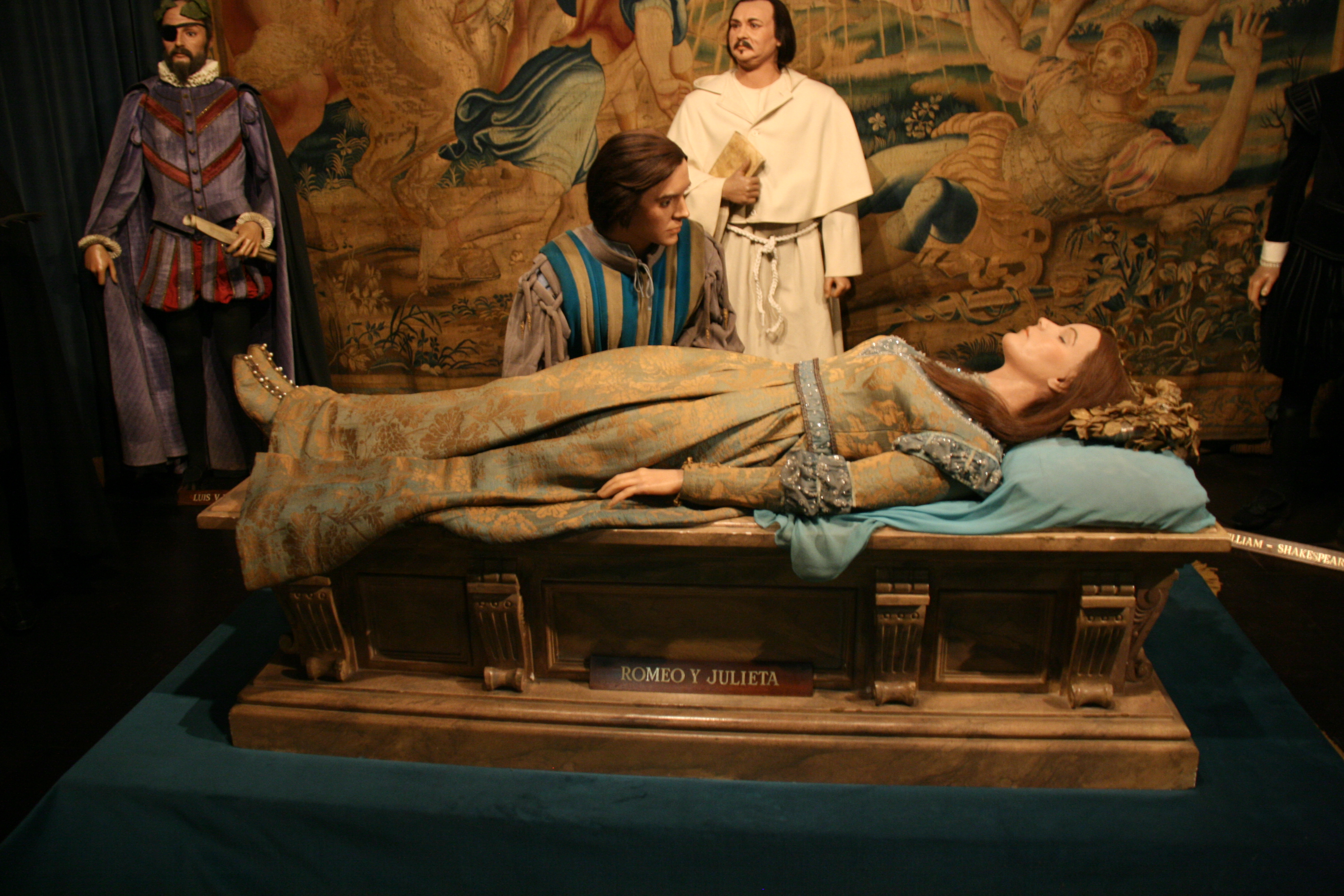
Romeo and Juliet

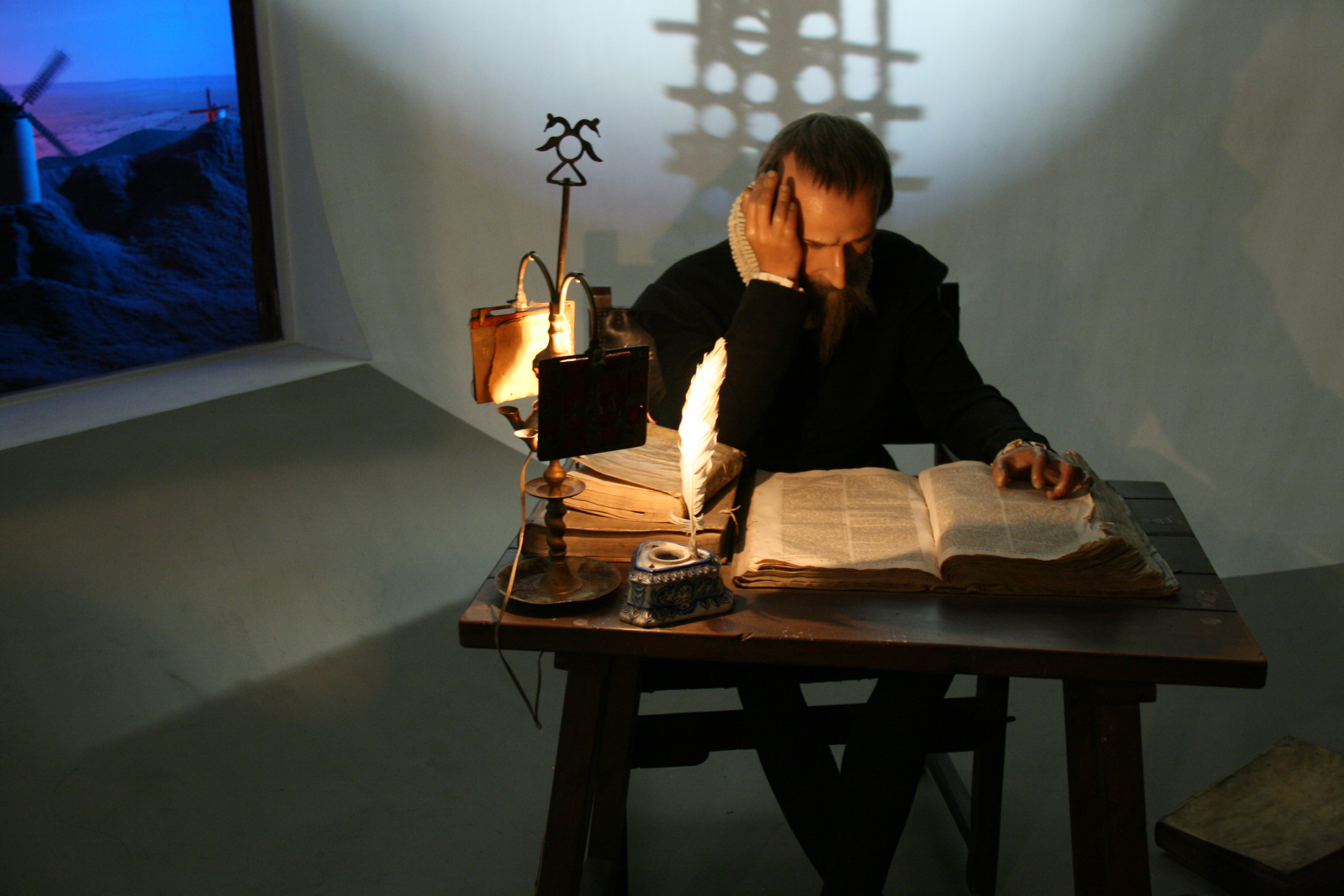
Miguel de Cervantes at his writing desk

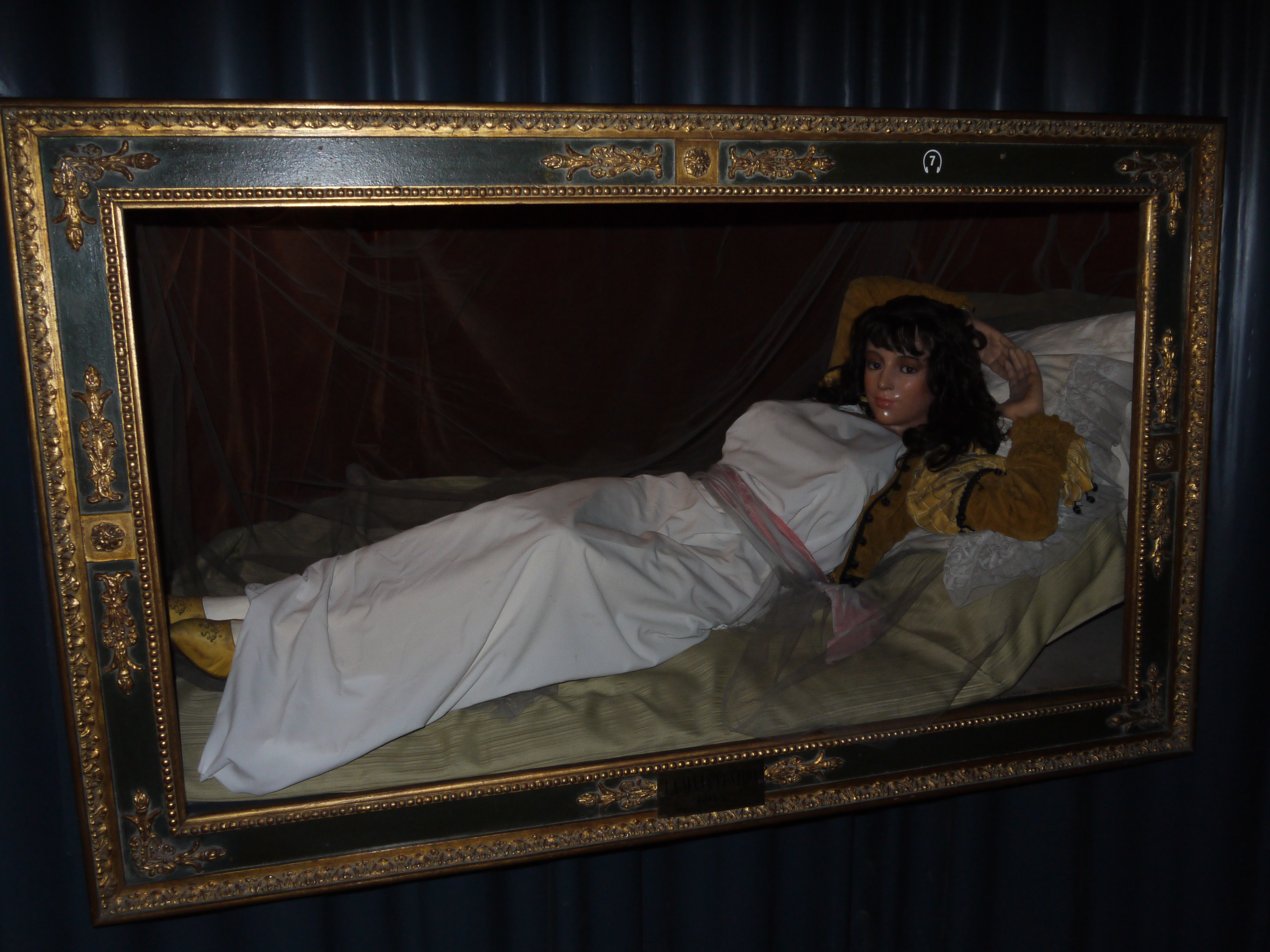
La maja vestida

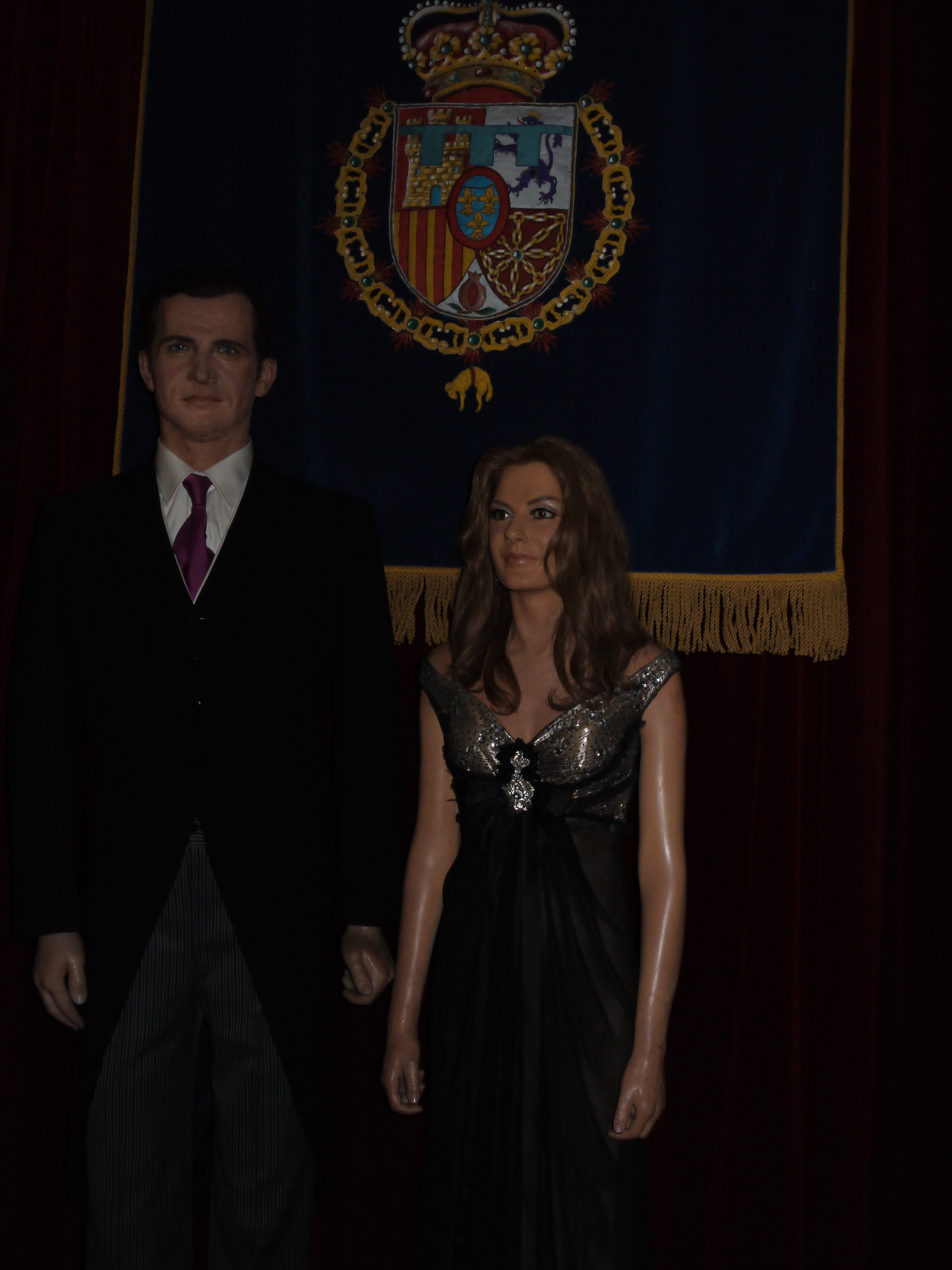
The King and Queen of Spain

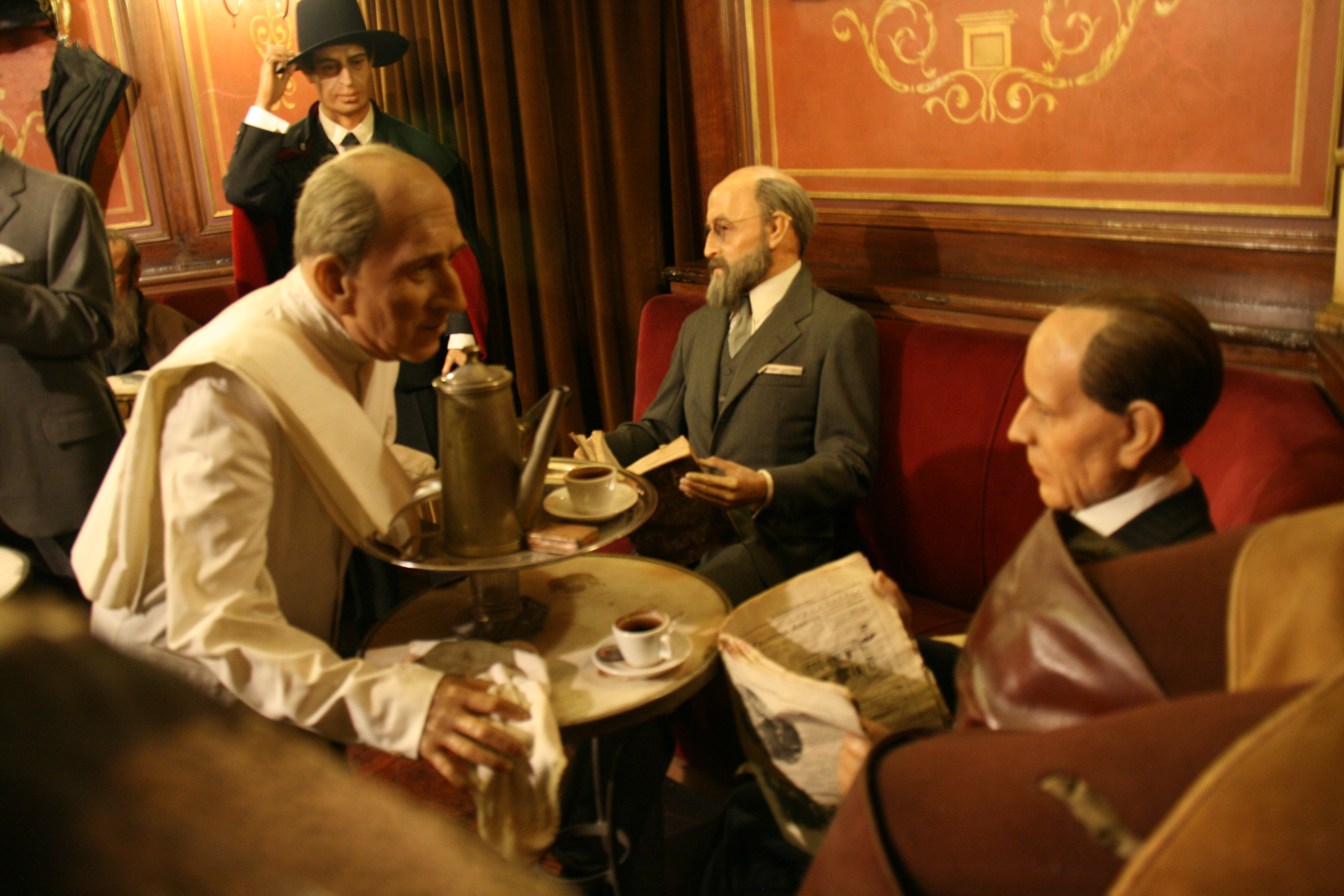
Madrid cafe scene

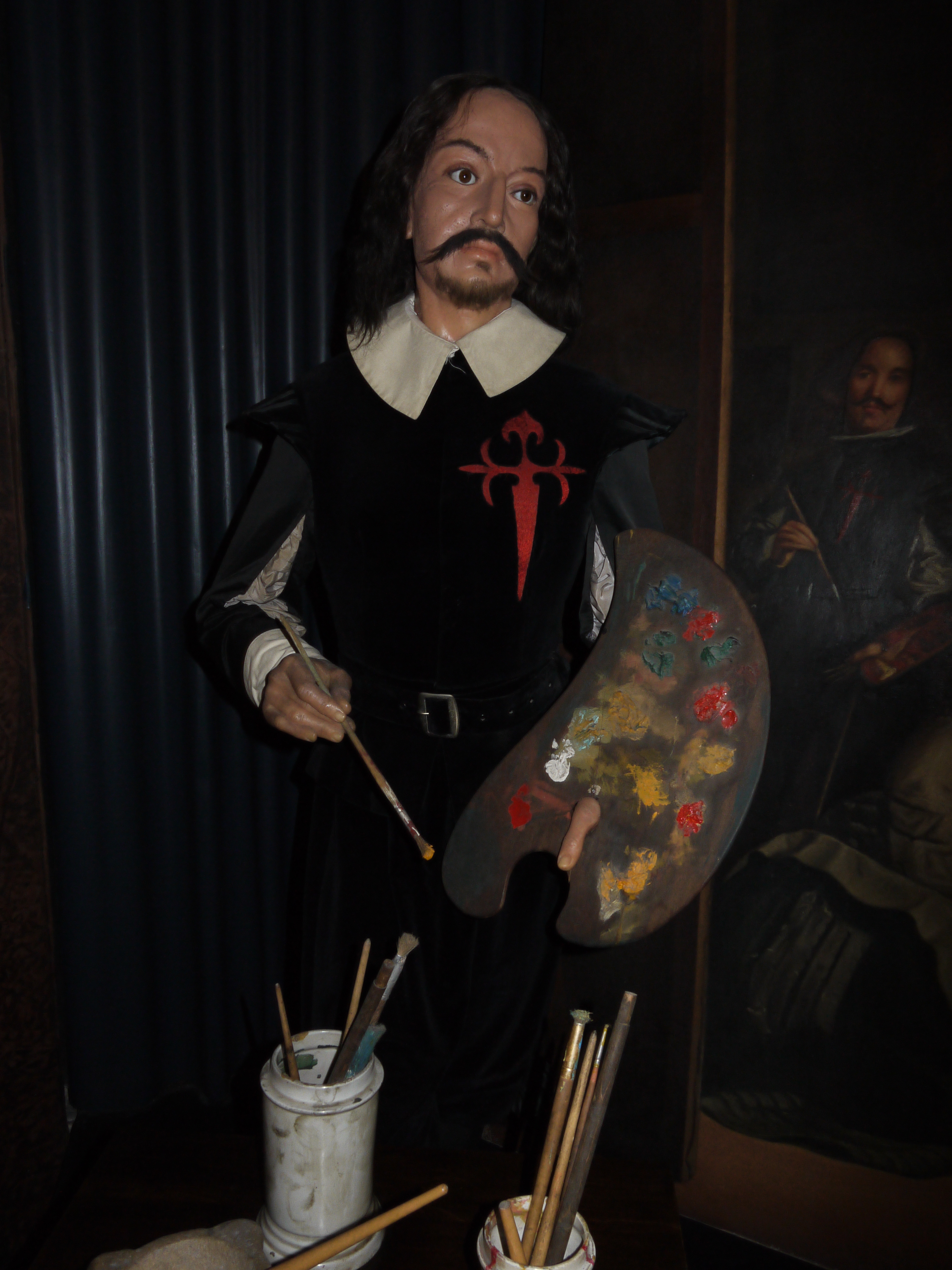
Spanish painter Diego Velázquez

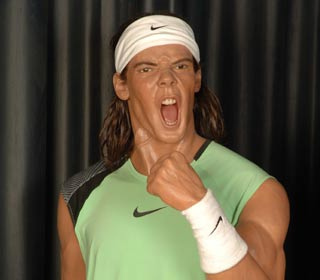
Spanish tennis player Rafael Nadal

== See also ==
- List of museums in Madrid
- Life of Christ Museum
- Wax Museum of Fátima
- Wax Museum of Lourdes
