= Rafael Bachiller =

Spanish astronomer

Rafael Bachiller García (Madrid, 1957) is a Spanish astronomer and science communicator. He is the director of the Royal Observatory of Madrid (IGN, Ministry of Transports) and director of the National Astronomical Observatory. He is member of the Royal Academy of Doctors of Spain and the national representative of the International Astronomical Union in Spain. He is secretary of the National Commission of Astronomy and Spanish delegate in the boards of directors of international institutions such as the European Southern Observatory (ESO) and the Institute of Millimetre Radioastronomy (IRAM).

Rafael Bachiller is known for the discovery of young solar protostars and the characterization of molecular gas in planetary nebulae; his published works have received more than 20000 citations. He has published several books and regularly writes in the newspaper El Mundo. He has received several prizes for his outreach work, including the science communication prize from the Spanish National Research Council and BBVA foundation in 2023.
