= Museo Geominero =

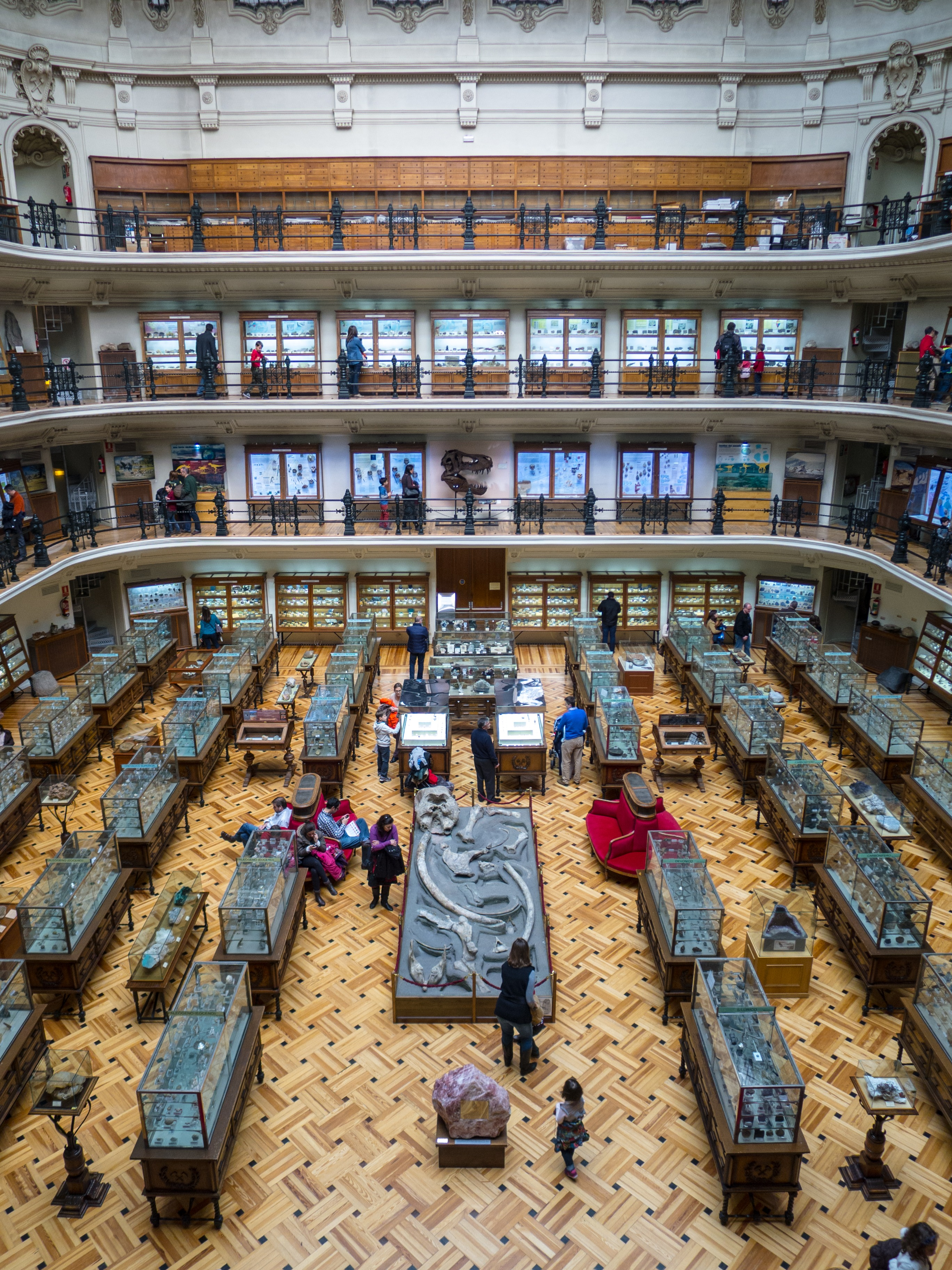
- Main hall of the museum
- Established: 1846
- Location: Calle Rios Rosas, 23, 28003, Madrid, Spain
- Coordinates: 40.4427°N 3.6996°W
- Type: Science museum
- Public transit access: Ríos Rosas
- Website: Museum website

The Museo Geominero (Geomineral Museum) is a geology museum displaying minerals and fossils from Spain and its former colonies. It is located inside the Instituto Geológico y Minero de España building in Madrid, Spain.

== History ==
The museum has its roots in the collection of the 'Comisión para formar la Carta geológica de Madrid y la general del Reino' (Commission to form the geographical letter of Madrid and the kingdom), which was created by Isabella II in 1849.

The collection has been housed in its current location since 1927, and was conceived of by Spanish mining engineer D. Primitivo Hernández Sampelayo.

It has been known as the Museo geominero since 1989.

== The building ==
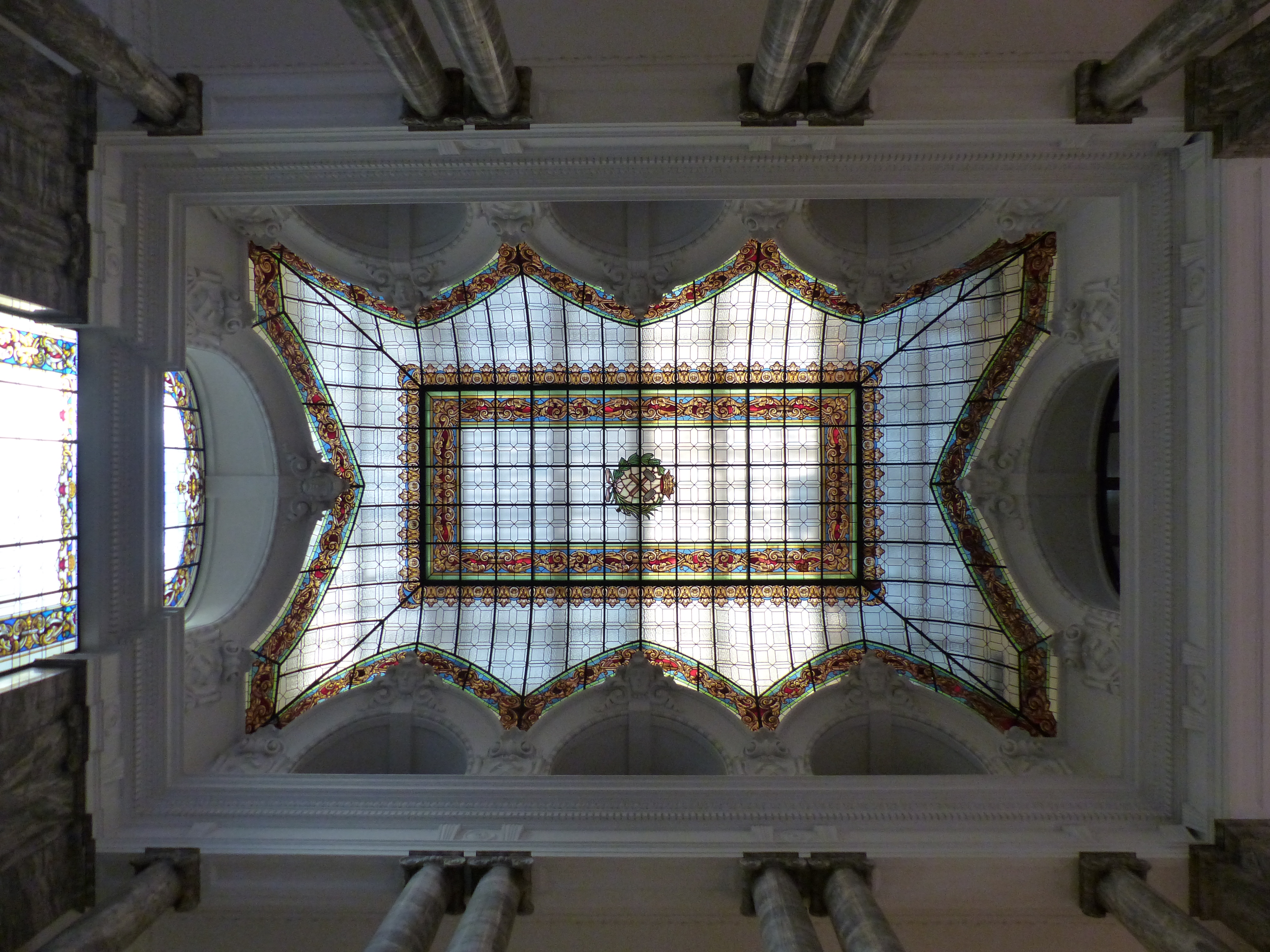
Ceiling of the museum

The museum is located in the headquarters of the Geological and Mining Institute of Spain. The building was designed by Spanish architect Francisco Javier de Luque, and built between 1921 and 1925. The contents of the museum are displayed in 250 showcases on the ground floor of the building and three perimeter balconies.

== Collections ==
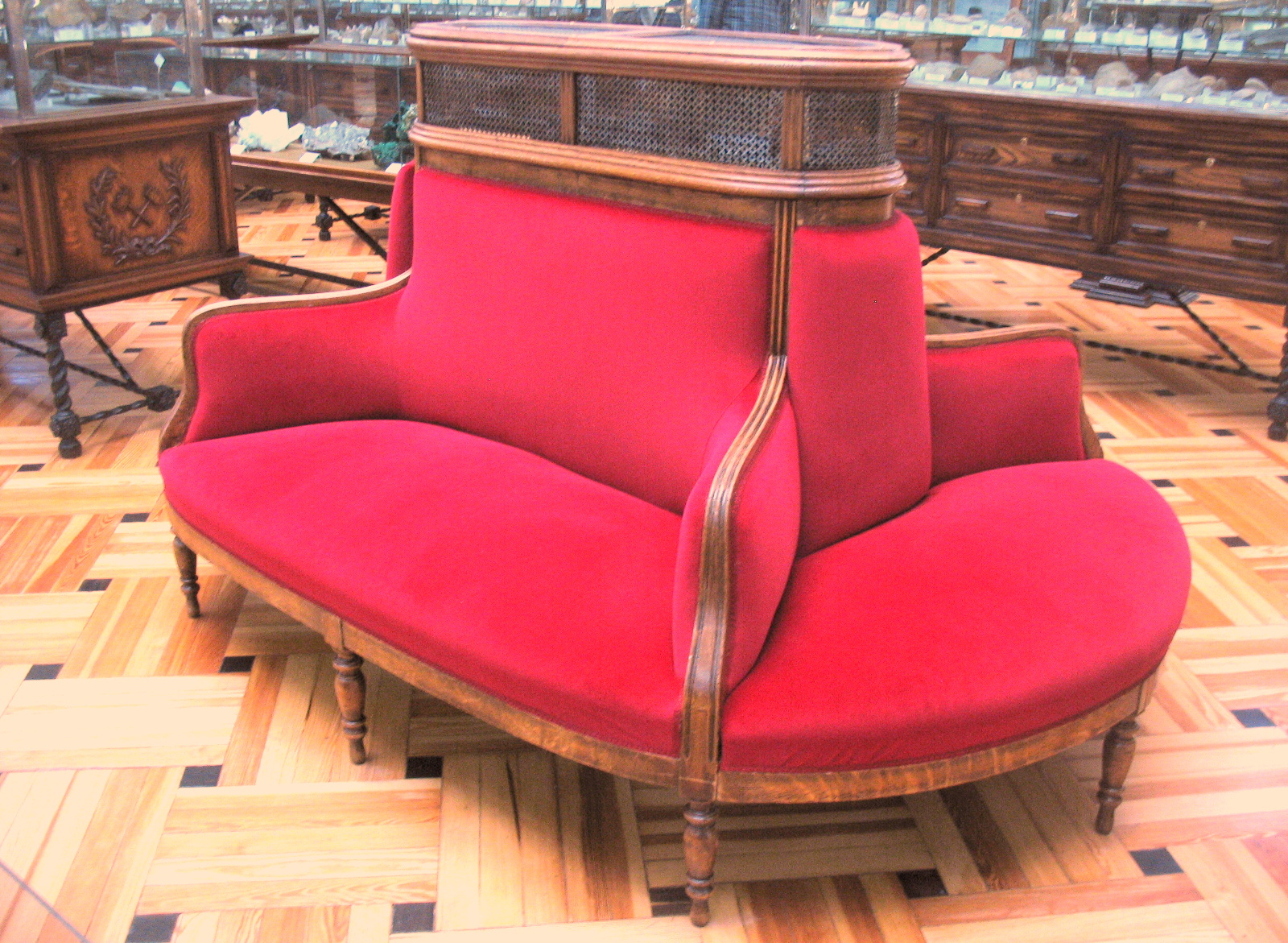
Sofa in the main hall

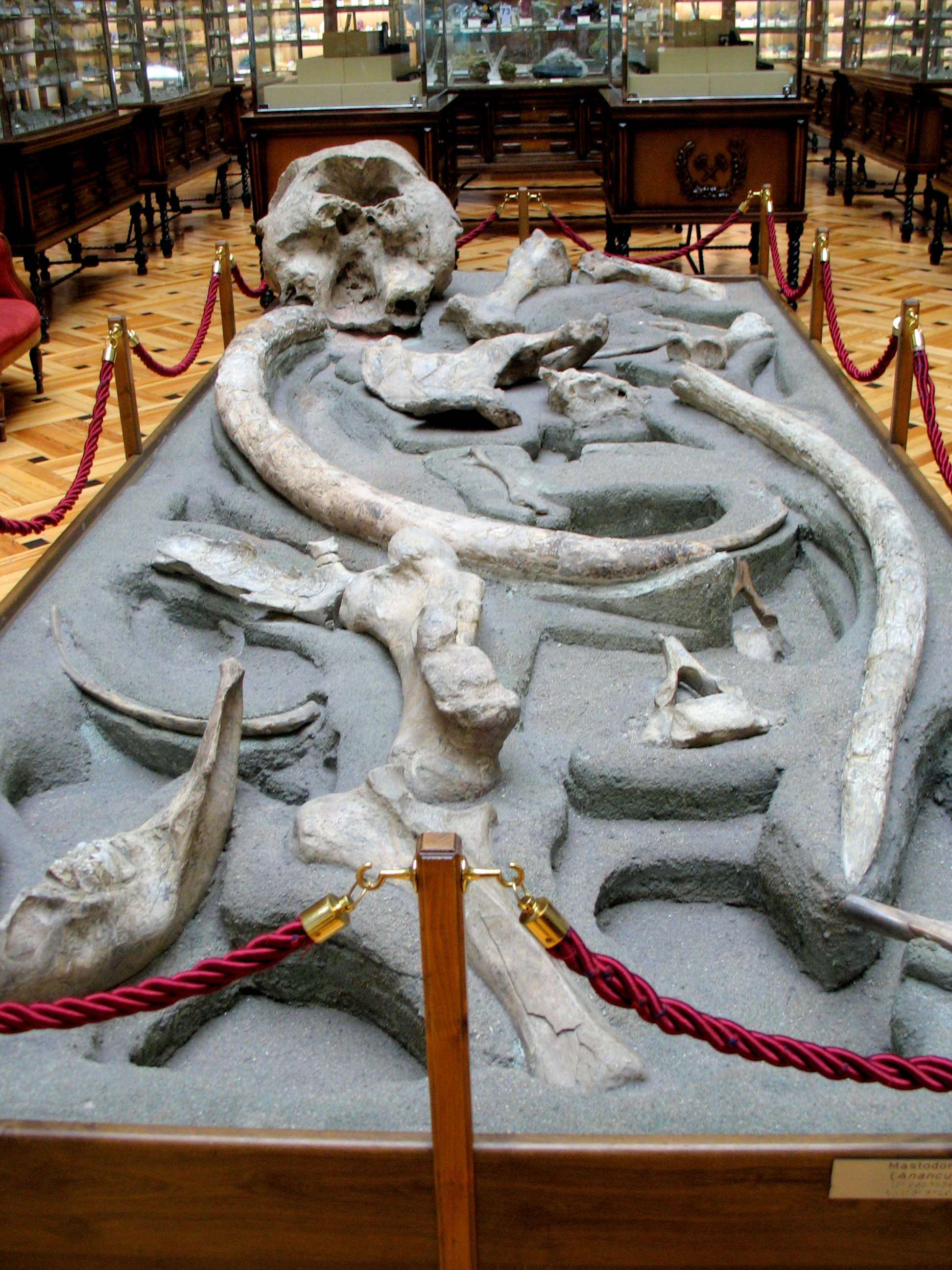
Fossils on the ground floor of the museum

- Mineral collection
- Collection of mineral resources
- Collection of minerals from the Autonomous Regions of Spain
- Rock collection
- Fossils of Spanish flora and invertebrates
- Collection of fossil vertebrates
- Collection of foreign fossils
- Systematic collection of fossil invertebrates

== See also ==
- List of museums in Madrid
