= The Fountain on the Prado, Madrid =

Painting by David Roberts

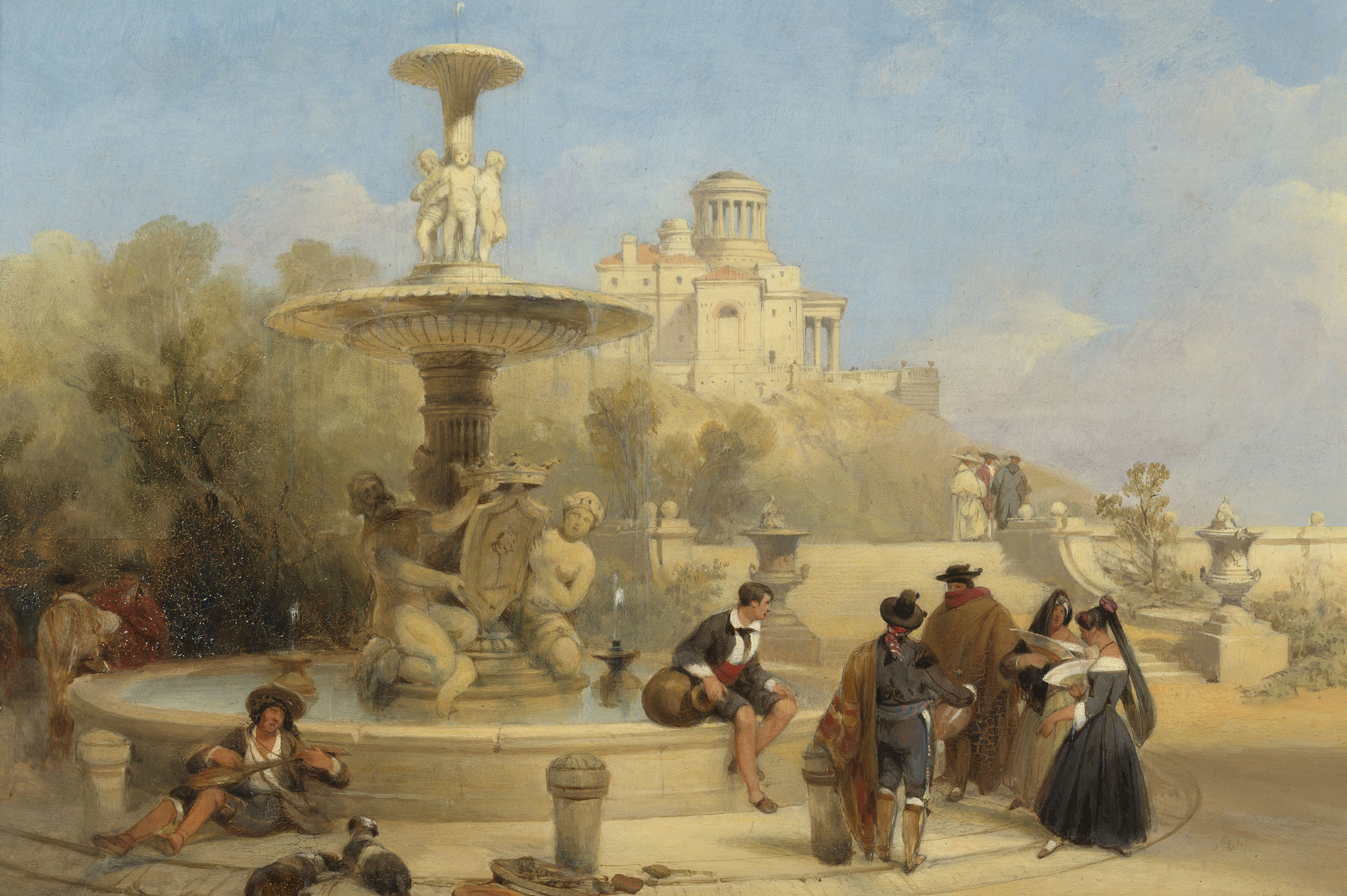
- Artist: David Roberts
- Year: 1841
- Type: Oil on panel, cityscape painting
- Dimensions: 43.5 cm × 56 cm (17.1 in × 22 in)
- Location: Royal Collection

The Fountain on the Prado, Madrid is an 1841 landscape painting by the British artist David Roberts. It depicts a view in the Buen Retiro Park off the Paseo del Prado in Madrid. The Royal Observatory is in the background.

Roberts had toured Spain in 1832 and the sketches he made there inspired a number of paintings on his returning to Britain. The painting was commissioned by Queen Victoria as Christmas gift for her husband Prince Albert and it was hung at Osborne House on the Isle of Wight. It remains in the Royal Collection today.

== Bibliography ==
- Clarke, Deborah & Remington, Vanessa. Scottish Artists 1750-1900: From Caledonia to the Continent. Royal Collection Trust, 2015.
- Marsden, Jonathan. Victoria & Albert: Art & Love. Royal Collection, 2010.
- Sim, Katherine. David Roberts R.A., 1796–1864: A Biography. Quartet Books, 1984.
