= Cerralbo Museum =

Art museum in Madrid, Spain

- Museo Cerralbo
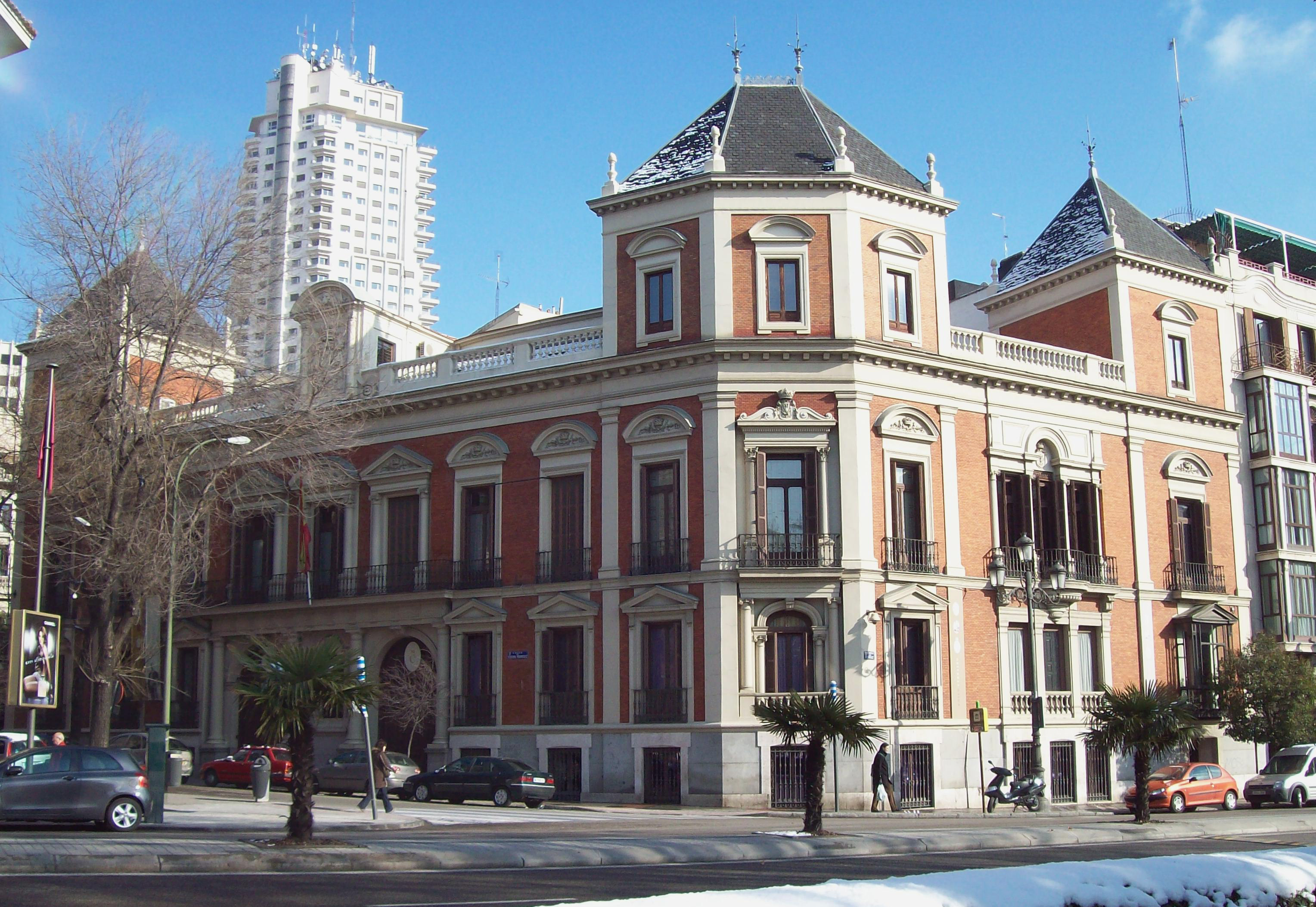
- Façade of the Museum
- Established: 1944
- Location: Calle Ventura Rodríguez 17, Madrid, Spain
- Coordinates: 40°25′25″N 3°42′52″W
- Type: Fine art museum, numismatic museum, antiquities museum, decorative arts museum

Spanish Cultural Heritage
- Official name: Museo Cerralbo
- Type: Non-movable
- Criteria: Monument
- Designated: 1962
- Reference no.: RI-51-0001382

The Cerralbo Museum (Spanish: Museo Cerralbo) is an art museum in Madrid, Spain. It houses the art and historical object collections of Enrique de Aguilera y Gamboa, Marquis of Cerralbo, who died in 1922. It is one of the National Museums of Spain and it is attached to the Ministry of Culture.

== History ==
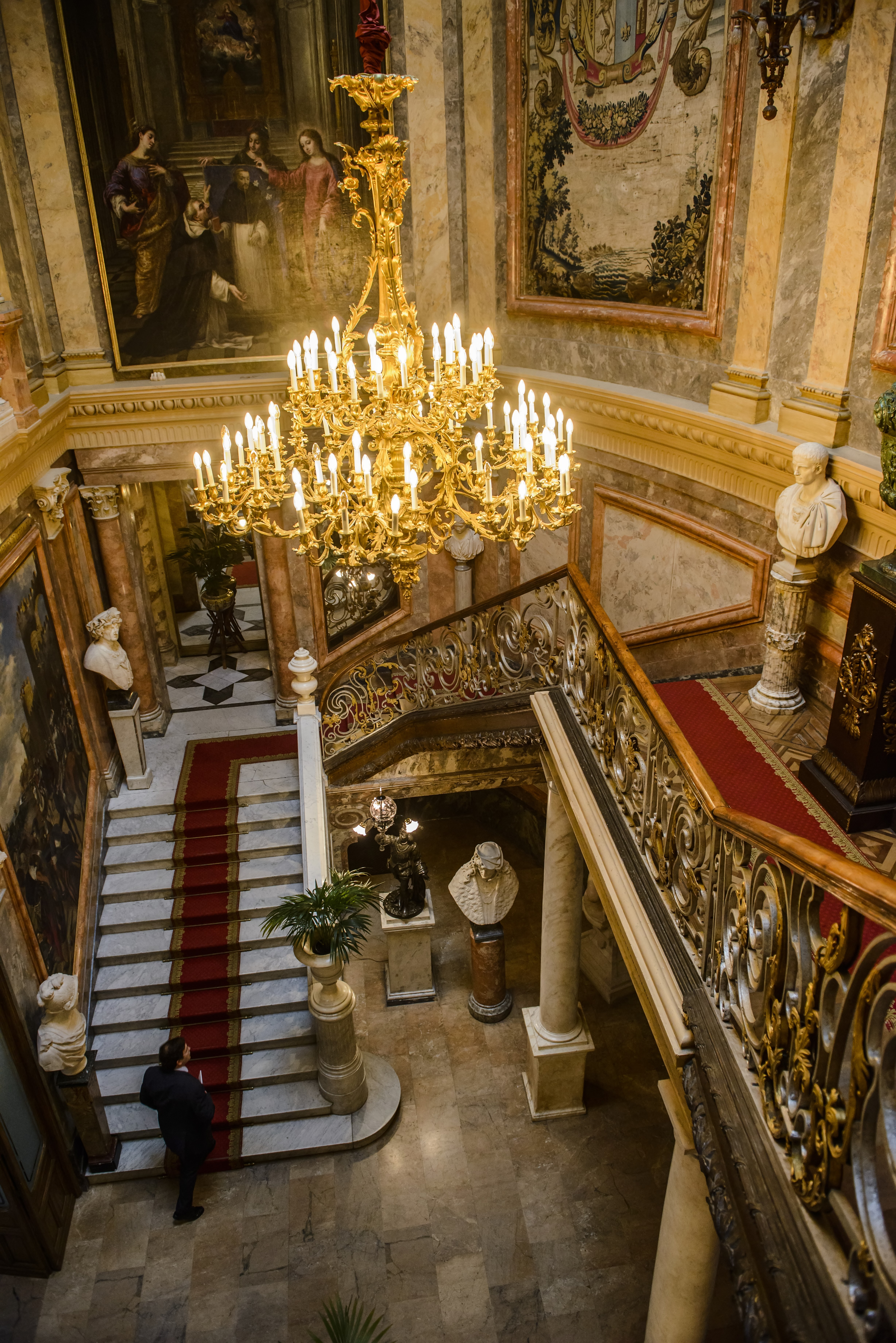
The staircase

Enrique de Aguilera y Gamboa, the Marquis of Cerralbo, opened the place as private gallery in 1893.

After the Spanish State accepted to inherit the collection in 1924, the building opened to students and researchers. The Marquis' collection was split, with a part moved to the National Archaeological Museum and the rest remaining at the building, which was constituted as a proper museum in 1944.

The building was built in the 19th century, according to Italian taste, and it was luxuriously decorated with baroque furniture, wall paintings and expensive chandeliers. It retains to a large extent its original aesthetics.

The building was protected as historical-artistic monument in 1962.

== Collection ==
With more than 24,900 pieces, the original collection featured a large numismatics collection. The archaeology collection originally included the Greek, Roman, Etruscan and Egyptian pieces characteristic of 19th collectors, as well as items from the Iberian Peninsula (Neolithic, Iberian, Roman, Almohad) and two stone masks from Puerto Rico. The museum hosts a collection of Oriental art items, chiefly Chinese art and Japanese art.

The exhibited objects consists of items from the personal collections of the Marquis of Cerralbo and the Marquise of Villa-Huerta.

== Paintings ==
The Marquis showed a preference for Spanish and Italian works and religious and portrait paintings. Painting works include works by Jacopo Tintoretto, Jacopo Palma the Younger, El Greco, Ludovico Carracci, Alonso Cano, Zurbarán and Luis Paret.

== Gallery ==
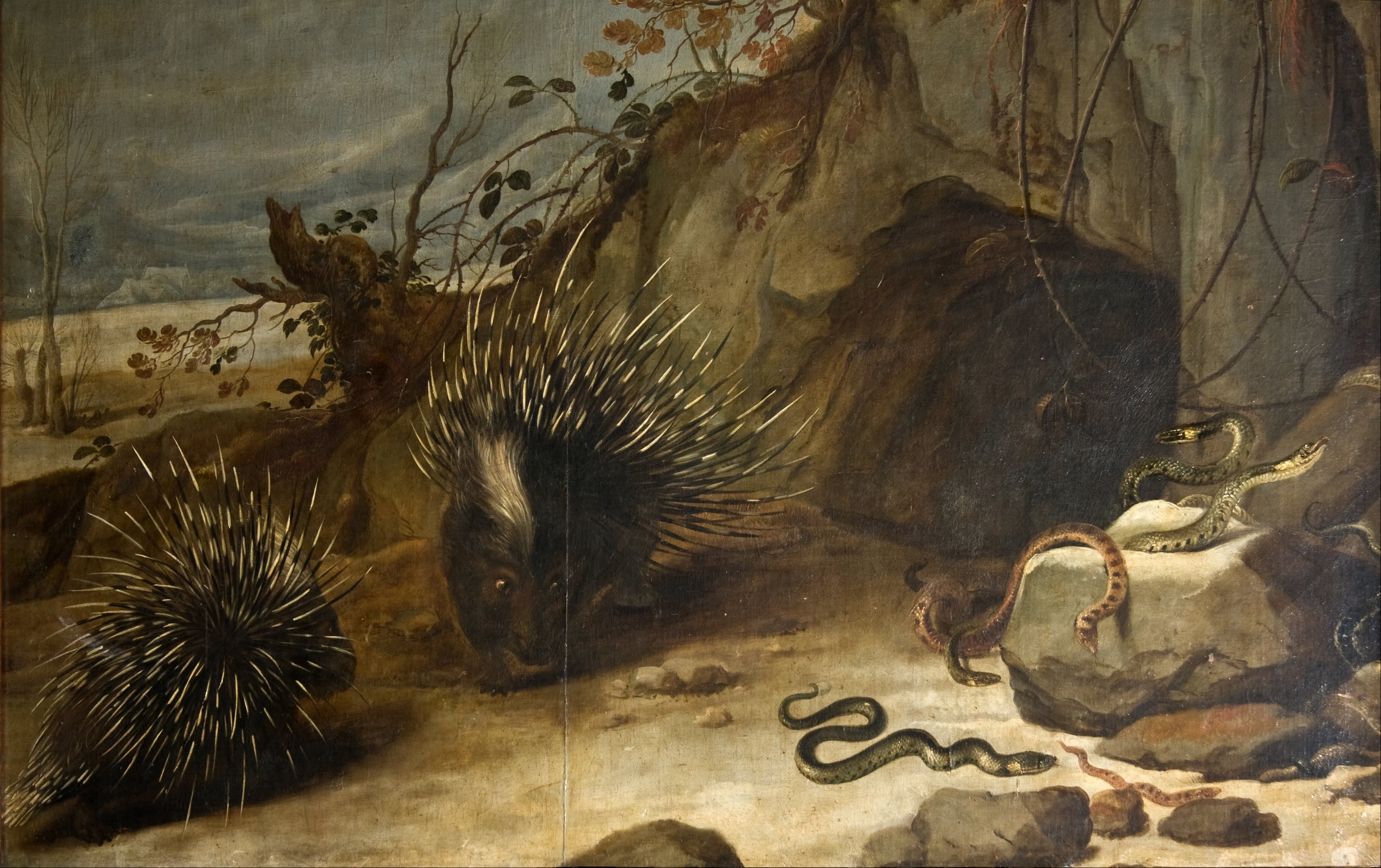
Frans Snyders, Porcupines and vipers

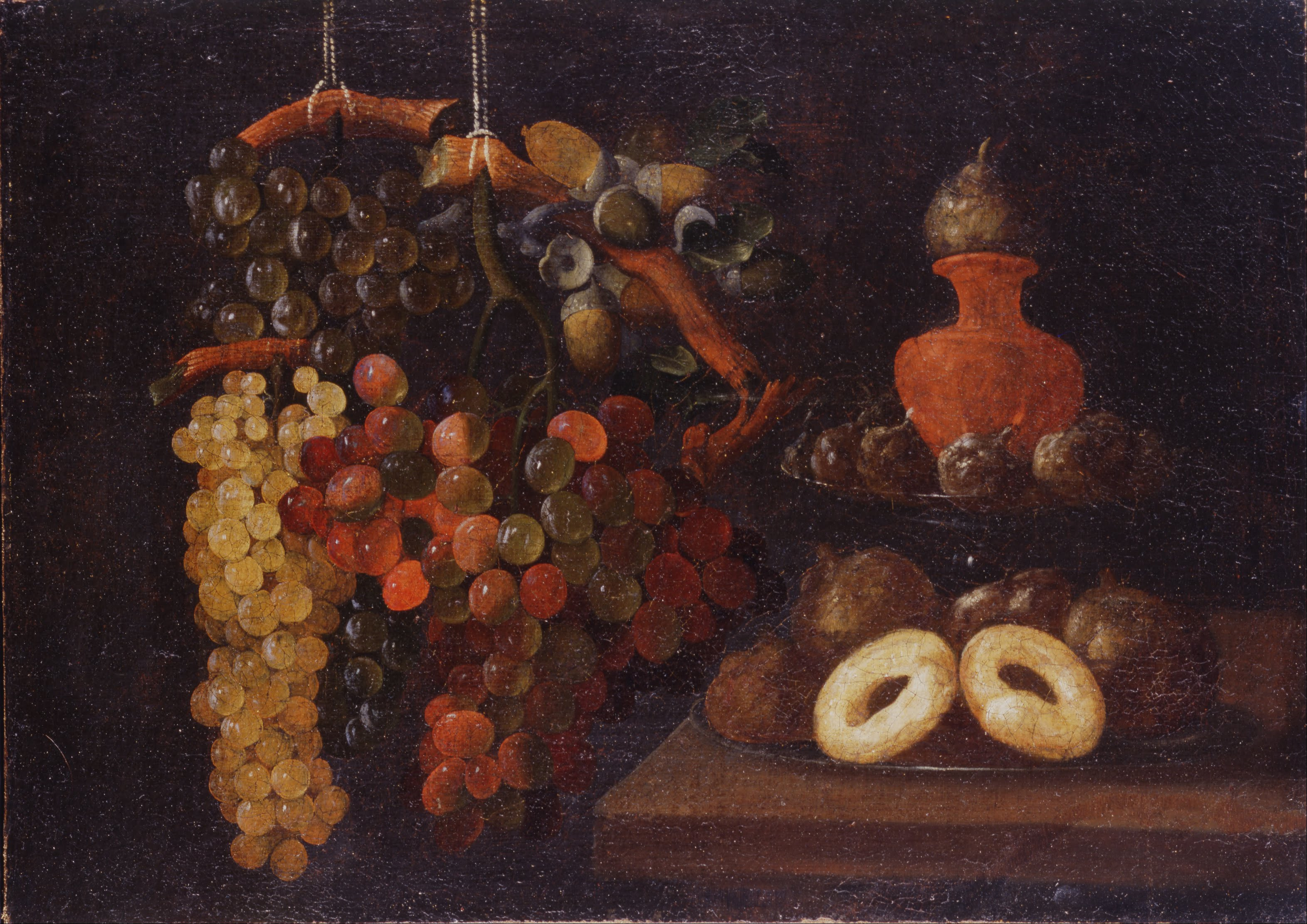
Juan de Espinosa, Life Still with grapes and cakes

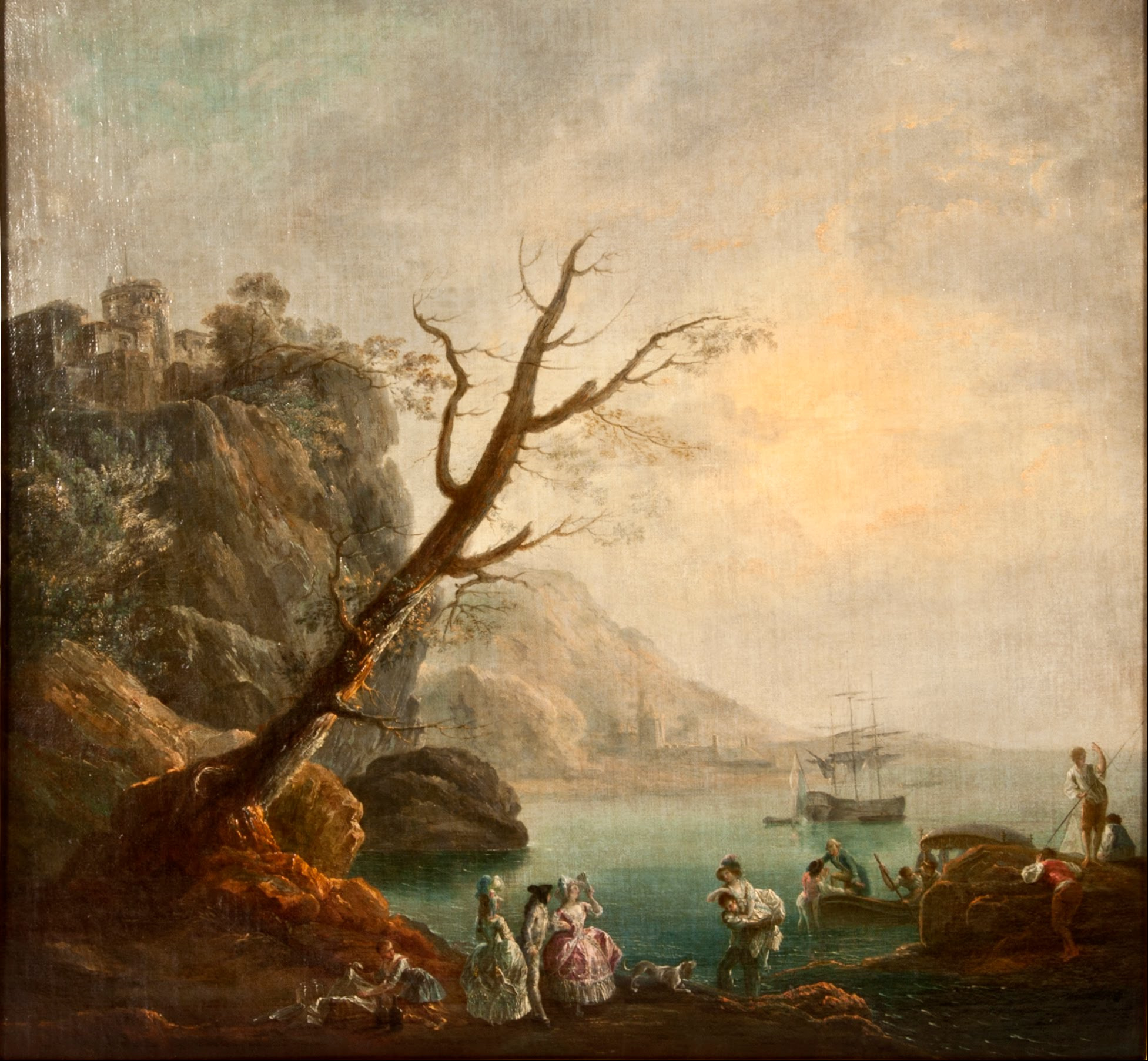
Luis Paret, Seascape with figures
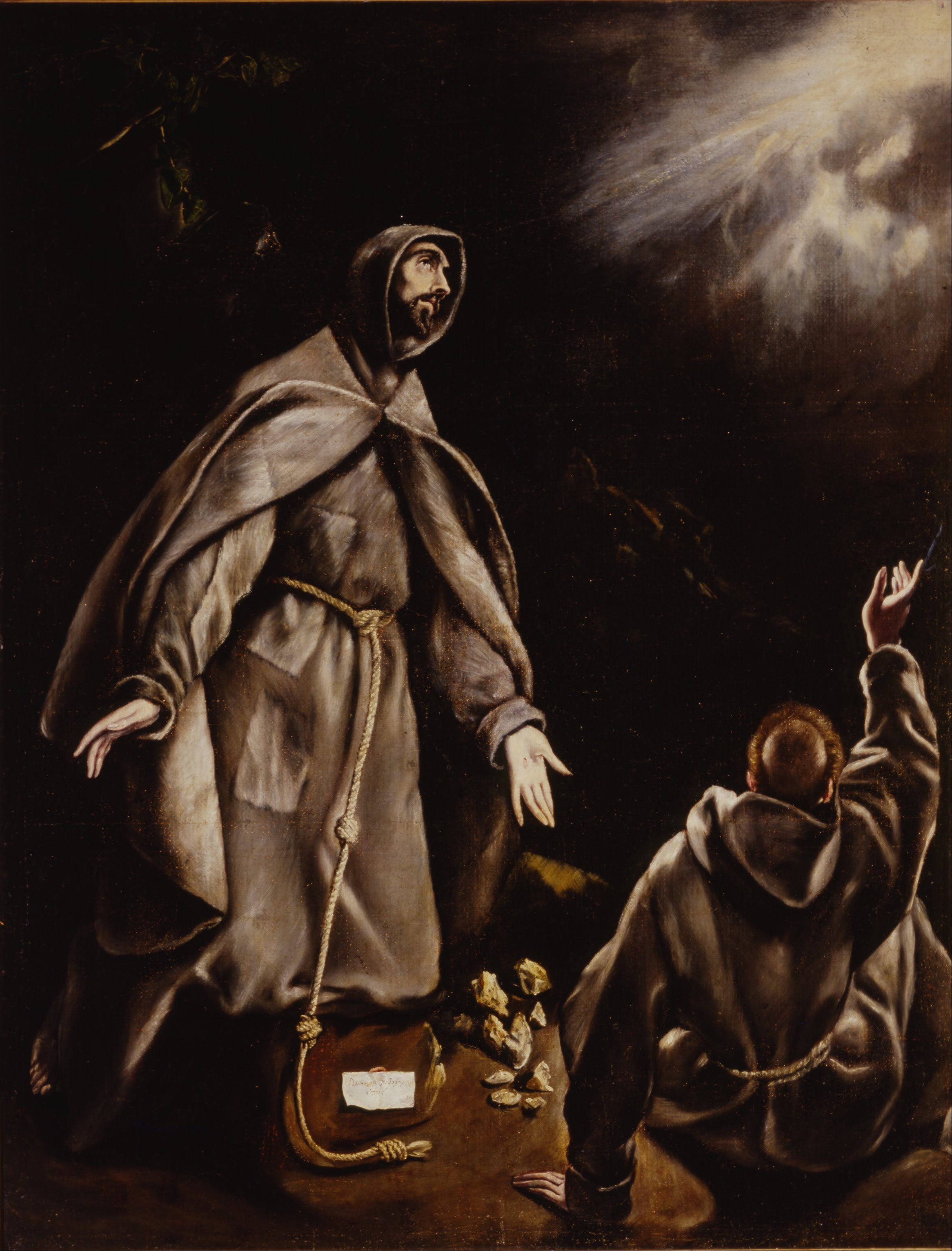
El Greco, Saint Francis in Ecstasy

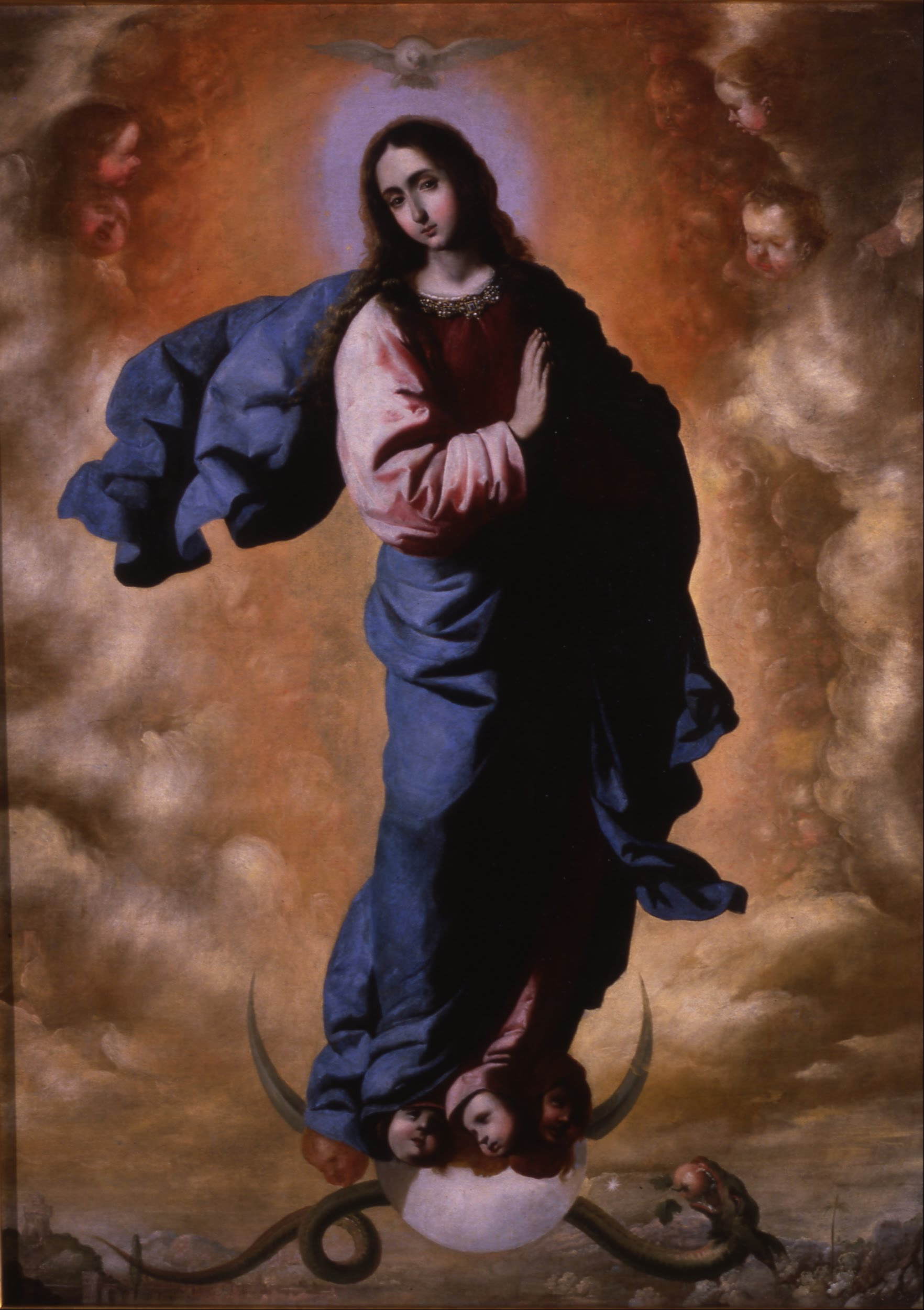
Francisco de Zurbarán, The Inmaculate Conception

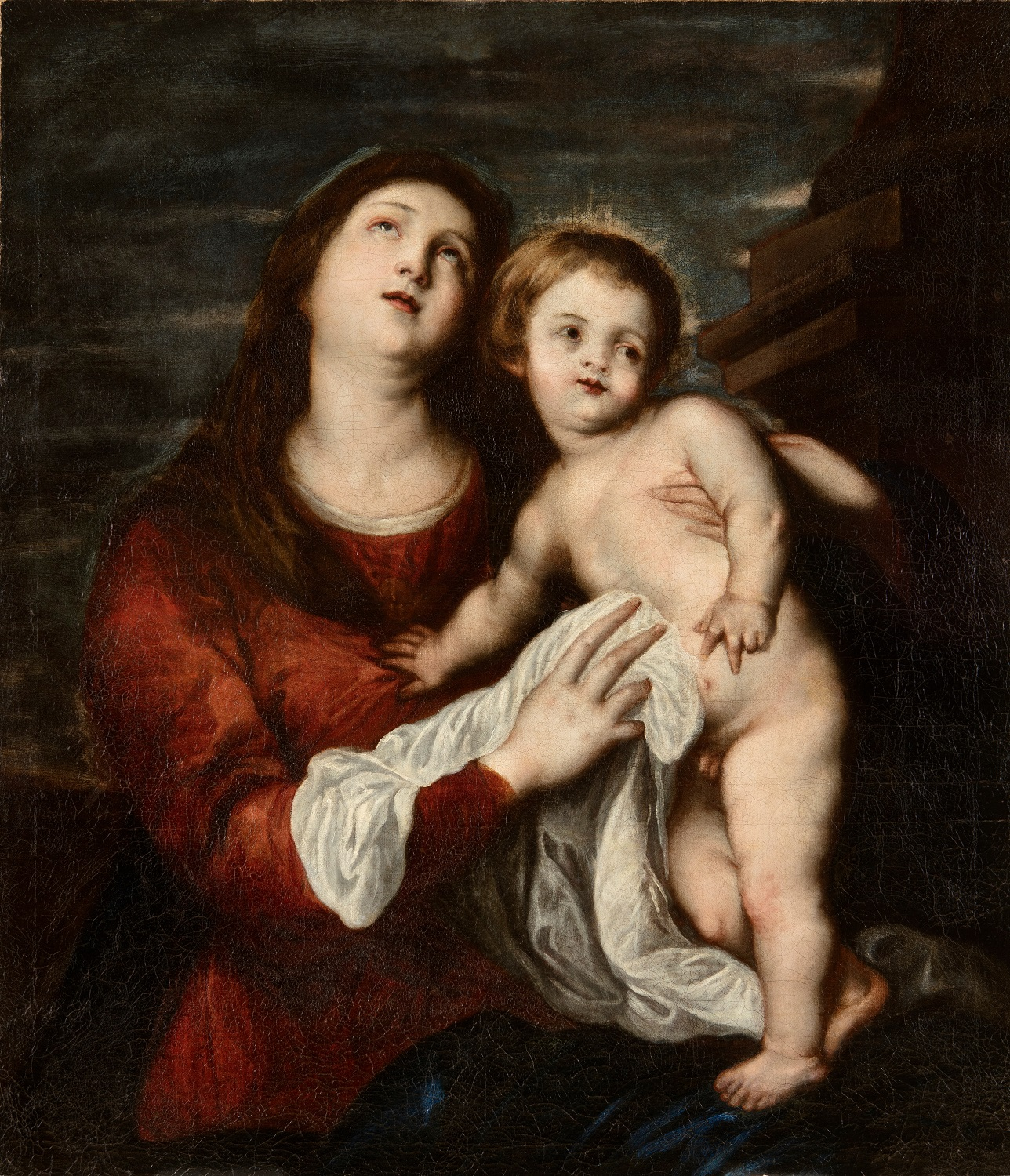
Anton Van Dyck, La Virgen con el niño

== Archaeology ==
The bulk of the archaeology section consists of the Marquis' numismatics collection.

== Decorative arts ==
The decorative arts section features porcelain pieces, pottery, tapestries, carpets, furniture, lamps and jewellery.

== Clocks ==
The museum also hosts a collection of 18th and 19th-century French and English clocks.

== See also ==
- List of museums in Madrid
