= Pacífico Power Plant, Madrid =

Coordinates: 40.4041°N 3.6741°W

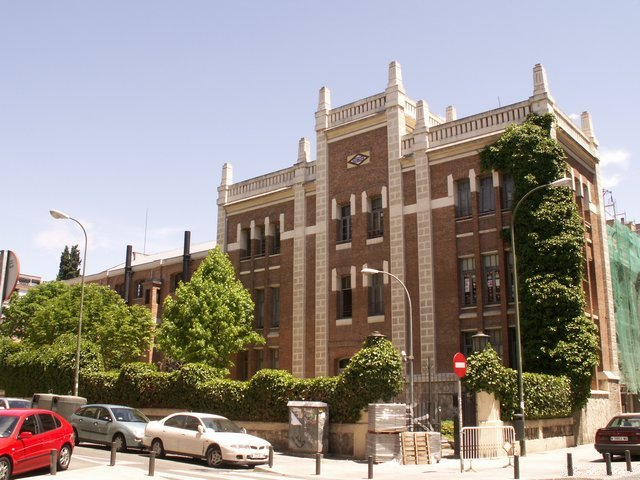
Exterior of the Nave de motores de Pacífico

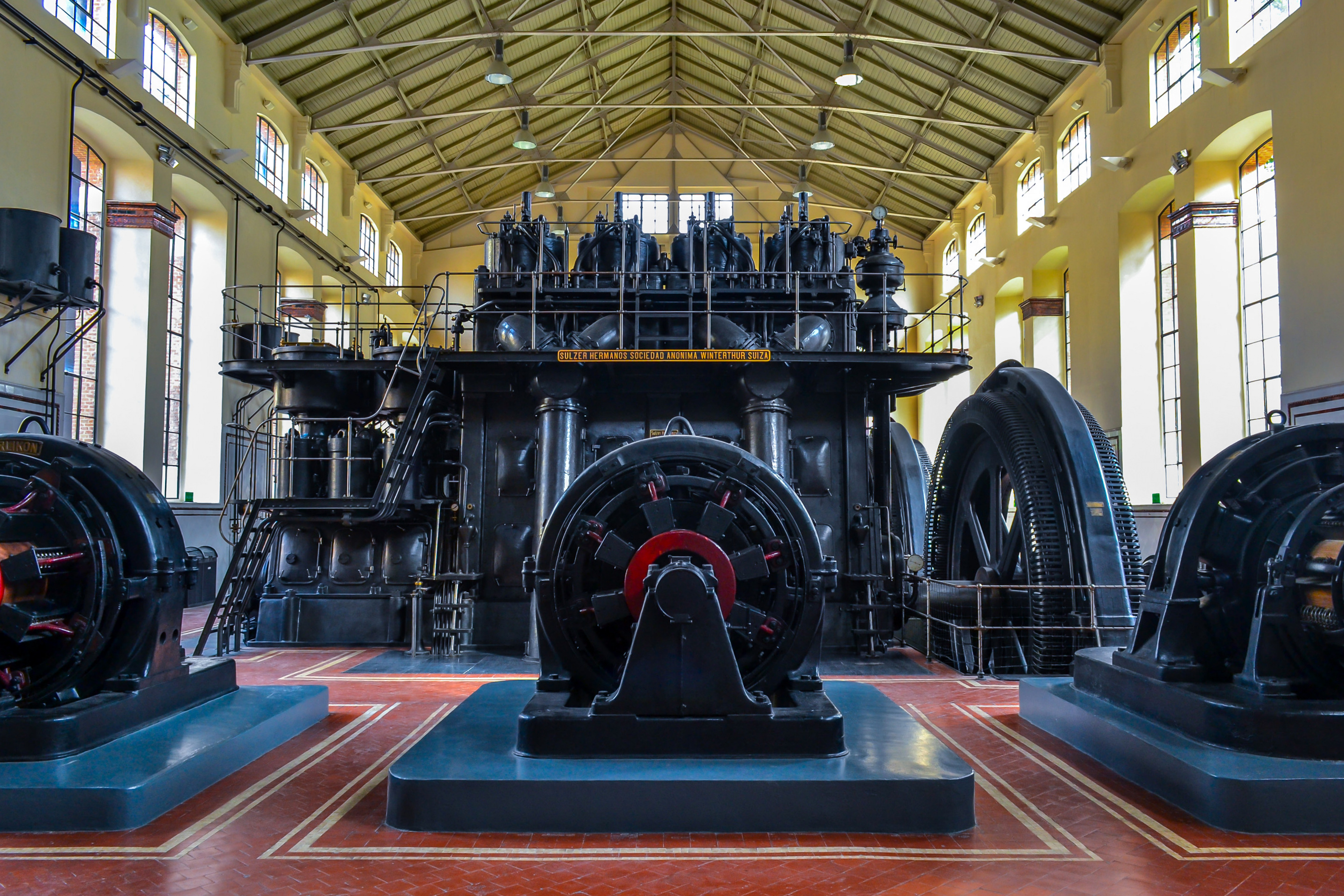
Diesel generators in the Motores de Pacifico building

The old Pacífico Power Plant (Spanish: Nave de motores de Pacífico) is a former power station belonging to the Madrid Metro. On 11 April 2013 the Directorate General of Historical Heritage of the Community of Madrid declared it a Bien de Interés Cultural. It is known by the name of its most important components, three massive diesel ship engines, and the Pacífico Metro station nearby.

Built in the 1920s, the Nave de motores de Pacífico was an active electric power station until the 1950s. It is now an exhibition and event space. Its architect was Antonio Palacios.

At present it is, along with Chamberí station, which is over 5 km away, one of the two sites of Platform 0, the visitor centre of the Madrid Metro.
