= Chamberí (Madrid Metro) =

Metro station in Madrid, Spain

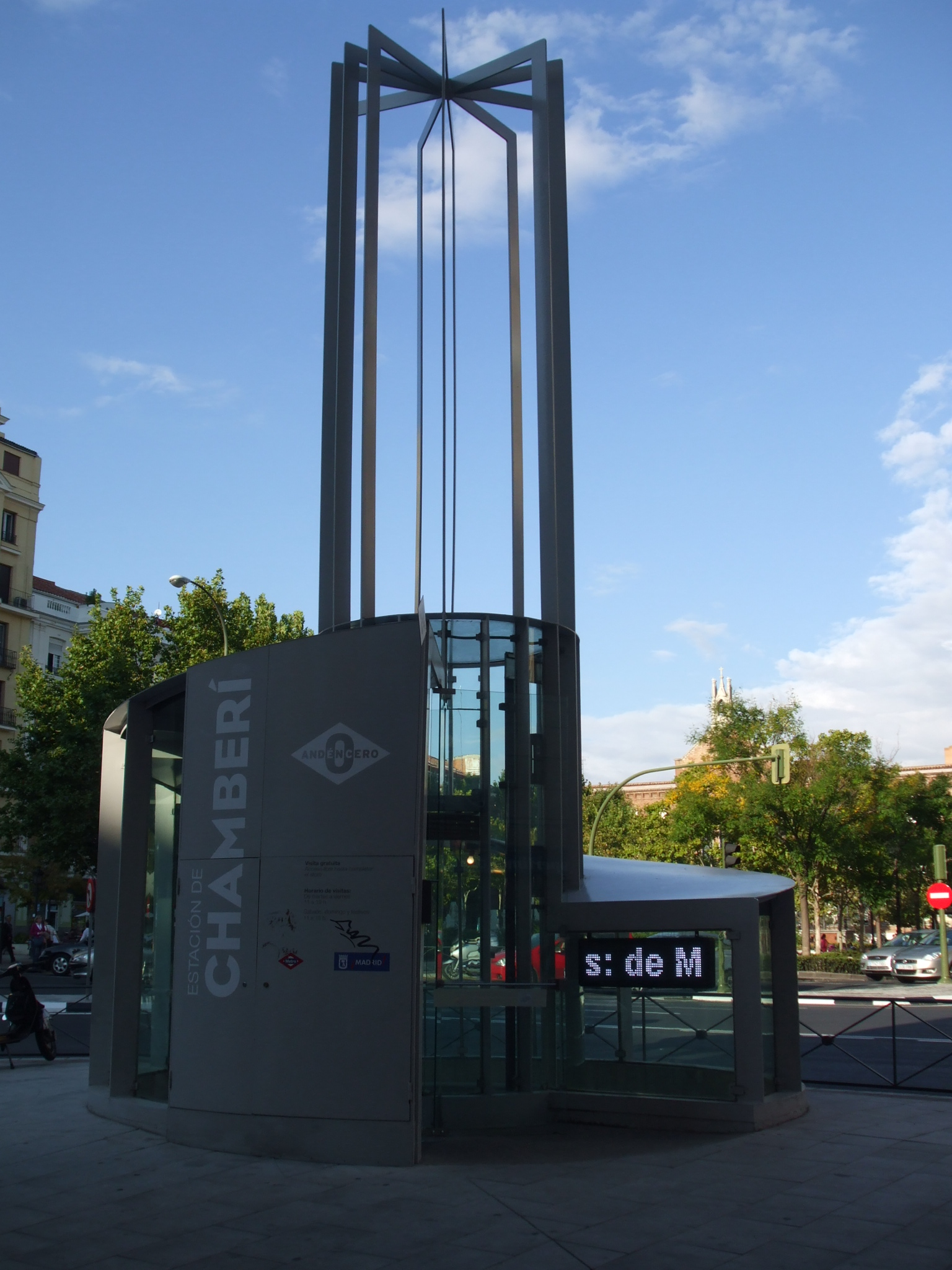
- Ground-level entrance of the Estación de Chamberí

General information
- Location: Spain
- Coordinates: 40.4323°N 3.69772°W
- System: Metro station
- Operator: Madrid Metro

History
- Opened: 17 October 1919
- Closed: 22 May 1966
Location

Chamberí is a defunct metro station on the Line 1 of the Madrid Metro. Being one of the original 8 metro stops of the Madrid Metro, the station has been closed since 22 May 1966 and has been operating as a museum since 2008.

The station is located under the Plaza de Chamberí. Though defunct, the Line 1 still passes through the station, between Iglesia and Bilbao.

== History ==
Designed by the architect Antonio Palacios, it was inaugurated on 17 October 1919. It was one of the original eight stations that served Madrid's first metro line. This was the first such project in Spain, and the architect was inspired by the look of the Parisian stations of the time. He managed to mitigate the possible reluctance of the public to use the subway, by using bright, colorful materials in the spaces in contact with travelers, such as hallways, tunnels, passage and platform finishes, extensively using tiles and other white and cobalt blue ceramic pieces. Its design met the criteria of functionality, simplicity and economy.

In the 1960s, due to increased passenger traffic, it was decided to upgrade Metro Line 1 to allow commissioning new trains with greater capacity, up to six cars. To accommodate this, the platforms of all stations needed to be expanded from the previous specification of 60 meters that they had since the Metro's opening, to the new standard length of 90 meters. Given the technical impossibility of extending Chamberí station and its proximity to those of Bilbao and Iglesia, the two stations on either side, the Ministry of Public Works decided to close the station on 22 May 1966.

The station remained unused for over forty years, with trains reducing their speed when passing through it, to which the platforms were cut to facilitate the movement. The fact that the external access had been bricked up allowed the conservation of many of the everyday objects of the time, such as billboards, turnstiles and even paper money. However, the station would eventually be vandalized.

On 31 August 2006 restoration works began with a view to turning its facilities into a museum. On 25 March 2008 it was finally reopened as one of the two locations, together with the Pacífico Power Plant, over 5 km away, of Platform 0, the visitor center of the Madrid Metro.
