= Spanish National Observatory =

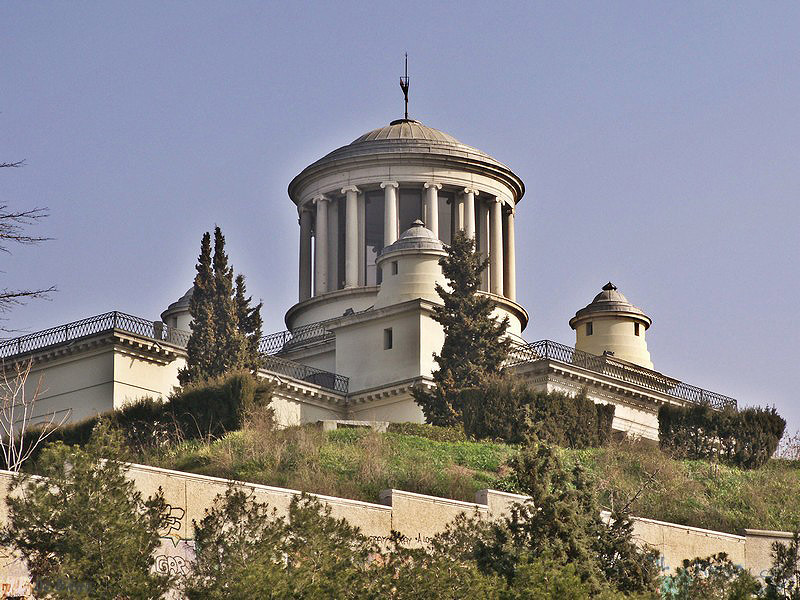
- The Royal Observatory (1790)
- Location: Madrid, Community of Madrid, Spain
- Coordinates: 40°24′30″N 3°41′15″W
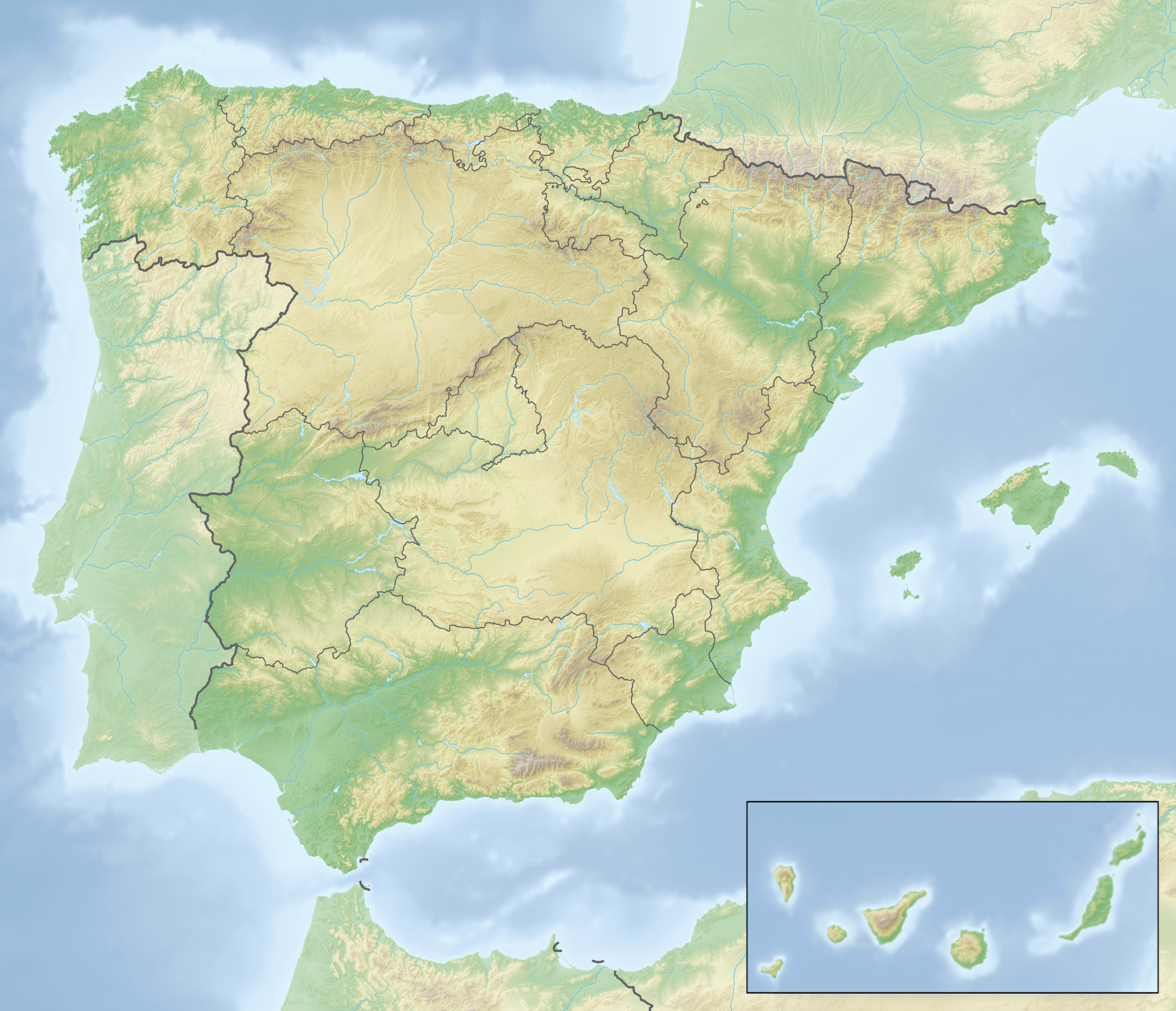
- Location of Spanish National Observatory

The Spanish National Observatory (Spanish: Observatorio Astronómico Nacional de España, OAN) is an astronomical observatory with several facilities in the Madrid area.

The Observatory has published a yearbook (the Anuario del Observatorio Astronómico de Madrid) since the 19th century.

== Royal Observatory ==
The seat of the National Observatory is the Royal Observatory (Spanish: Real Observatorio Astronómico de Madrid) in the Parque del Buen Retiro. This historic observatory was built in 1790. Equipped with a Herschel telescope, it took over the purely astronomical work of the naval observatory, the Real Instituto y Observatorio de la Armada, in the south of the country. The building was designed by Juan de Villanueva and represents one of the highlights of Spanish neoclassical architecture. Its domed lantern was conceived as a classical circular temple.

The Observatory houses historic scientific equipment and can be visited by prior arrangement. There is also a library.

== Yebes Observatory ==
Yebes Observatory is a modern facility north-east of Madrid. It is in a rural location near Guadalajara.

== See also ==
- Yebes Observatory RT40m
