= Calle de Fuencarral =

Street in Madrid, Spain

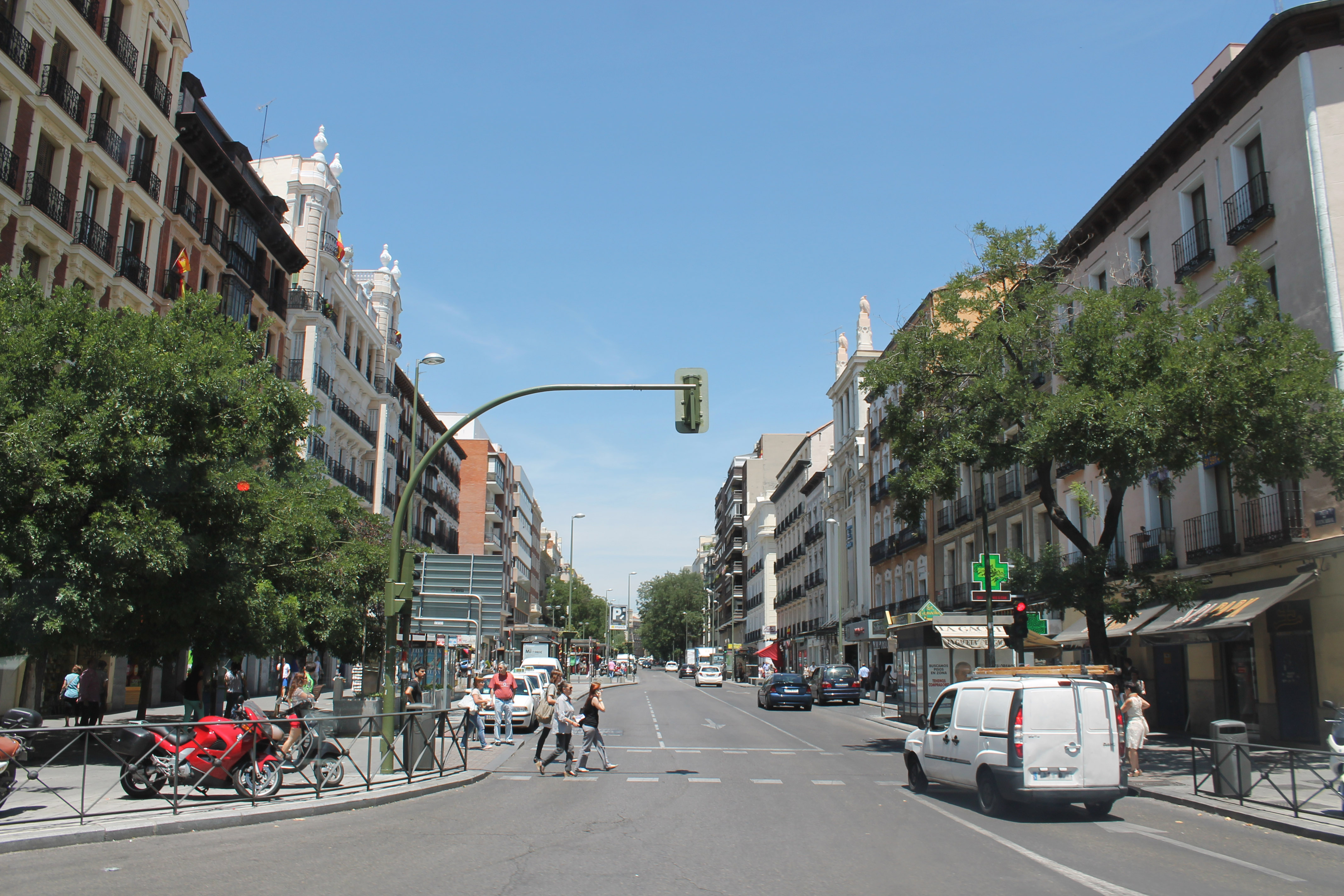
- View of Calle de Fuencarral from the Glorieta de Bilbao
- Interactive map of Calle de Fuencarral
- Length: 1.5 km (0.93 mi)
- Location: Madrid, Spain
- Postal code: 28004
- Nearest Metro station: Tribunal; Gran Vía; Bilbao
- South end: Gran Vía
- North end: Glorieta de Quevedo

Calle de Fuencarral is a street in the center of downtown Madrid, Spain. Today, it is a popular shopping street and tourist area. It also serves as the dividing line between the Chueca and Malasaña neighborhoods of downtown Madrid.

The street is noteworthy for being the fourth most expensive street to live on in Madrid.

The street intersects with Gran Vía, and runs parallel to Calle Hortaleza and Calle de Valverde.

== History ==
The street derives its name from the old township of Fuencarral outside of the old city of Madrid. Before Madrid was declared the capital of Spain, the northern part of the street was covered with streams and forests, and the street connected the city of Madrid to the old township of Fuencarral, which was annexed to the city of Madrid in 1950.

In 2009, part of the street was transformed to only allow foot traffic.

== Places of Interest ==
- The Museum of the History of Madrid is located at number 78, in the building of the old Royal Hospice of San Fernando
- Mercado de San Ildefonso, a historic market, is located at number 57
- The Humilladero de Nuestra Señora de la Soledad church is located at number 48
- Cine Proyecciones at number 136
