= List of All Creatures Great and Small (1978–1990 TV series) characters =

This is a list of characters—and the actor(s) who played them—featured in the BBC television series All Creatures Great and Small. Over 600 characters were used over ninety episodes, with several actors playing multiple characters during the course of the series.

James Herriot and Siegfried Farnon are the only two characters to appear in all ninety episodes. Tristan Farnon appears in sixty-five episodes.

== Characters ==
=== A ===
- Abbot, Mr — Kenneth Oxtoby
- Adamson, Nathaniel — Harry Markham
- Adderley — Michael Sheard
- Agnes — Wendy Jackson
- Ainsworth, Mrs — Gillian Barge
- Alderson, Mr — John Collin
- Allan, Fred — Tony Capstick
- Alec — Peter Faulkner
- Allen, Mr — Joe Ritchie
- Allen, Mrs — Enid Irvin
- Allenby, Mrs — Mary Wimbush
- Allinson, Dr Harry — John Grieve
- Almond, Jack — Bernard Atha
- Alton, Jennie — Alison Ambler
- Alton, Mrs — Jean Heywood
- Alton, Sylvia — Debbie Arnold
- Alton, Tim — Harry Walker
- Anderson, Josh — Bobby Knutt
- Angela — Chloë Annett
- Appleby, Alison — Dinah Handley
- Appleby, Brian — Dougie Brown
- Appleby, Colin — James Mason
- Arkwright, Daphne — Rita Giovannini
- Atkinson, Mr — Gordon Wharmby
- Auctioneer — Gordon Duffy
- Aunt Lucy — Katharine Page

=== B ===
- Bailie, Alice — Jill McCullough
- Bailie, Richard — Steve Delaney
- Bailes, Mr — Joby Blanshard
- Bailey, Mr (dog owner) — Wally Thomas
- Bailey, Mr — Peter Barnes
- Bailey, Mrs — Sarah Grazebrook
- Bagley, Eli — Tom Harrison
- Bannister, Willie — Derek Hicks
- Bantock, Mr — Roger Sloman
- Barge, Aloysius — James Cossins
- Barker, Mrs — Constance Chapman
- Barman ("The Beauty of the Beast") — Norman Robbins
- Barman ("Judgement Day") — Bert Oxley
- Barnett, Walt — George Little
- Barraclough, Geoffrey — Terry Taplin
- Barraclough, Prudence — Sarah Morris
- Barraclough, Verity — Claire Williamson
- Barratt, George — David Daker
- Barratt, Mrs — Fiona Walker
- Bartle, Bert — Ray Gatenby
- Bartram, Mrs — Fenella Norman
- Baxter, Mrs — Frances Cox
- Beamish, Ralph — Tony Steedman
- Beck, Mrs — Peggy Ann Wood
- Beckwith, Mr — Timothy Bateson
- Bedford, Miss — Joyce Latham
- Bell, Mrs — Sandra Gough
- Bellerby, Bob — Sam Naylor
- Bellerby, Mr — Joby Blanshard
- Bellerby, Mrs — June Ellis
- Bellerby, Ruth — Tricia George
- Bennett, Granville — James Grout
- Bennett, Zoe — Pamela Salem
- Benson, Luke — John Junkin
- Benson, Rob — Norman Bird
- Bentley, Joe — Finetime Fontayne
- Beresford, Ronald — Kenneth Waller
- Beresford, Mrs — Diana Flacks
- Berrydale, Mr (radiogram salesman) — Max Marsh
- Bert — Bruce Allen
- Bert — Terry Gunn ("The Nelson Touch") and Nicholas Hamnett ("Hampered")
- Beryl — Kathy Jones
- Betty ("Advice and Consent") — Nancy Gower
- Betty ("Ways and Means") — Julie Melvin
- Biggins, Ezra — John Sharp
- Biggins, Hilda— Kathleen Helme ("Every Dog His Day") and Margaret Jackman ("Cheques and Balances" and "If Music Be the Food of Love")
- Billings, Ken — Barry Jackson
- Bilton, Kit — Gorden Kaye ("Pups, Pigs and Pickle") and Bill Croasdale ("For Richer, For Poorer")
- Bilton, Mrs — Muriel Rogers
- Binks, Mrs — Maggie Ollerenshaw
- Binks, Wesley — Michael Conway
- Binns, Mr — John Keech
- Binns, Tony — Simon Bleakley
- Birse, Mrs — Diana Davies
- Birtwhistle, Len — Ashley Baker
- Birtwhistle, Mr — Norman Mitchell
- Birtwhistle, Mrs — Ina Clough
- Blackburn, Mr — Peter Ivatts
- Blackwood, Mr — John Atkinson
- Blackwood, Mrs — Sheila Mitchell
- Blenkinsopp, Mr — William Hoyland
- Blundell, David — Andrew Rowley
- Boddy, Mr — Billy Regan
- Boggs, Mr — Tony Nelson
- Bond, Mr — Michael Lees and Kenneth Cranham
- Bond, Mrs — Sonia Graham
- Bootland, Malcolm — David Julian
- Bootland, Seth — Guy Nicholls
- Bosworth, Colonel (Charlie) — Michael Lees
- Bosworth, Rachael — Dominique Barnes
- Bourbon Ensemble, The — Harvey Brough, John Miller, Jeremy Taylor, Richard Allen, Nick Barraclough
- Bowling — Ray Ashcroft
- Boy ("Tricks of the Trade") — Craig Brigg
- Boy ("Puppy Love") — David Thackwray
- Bradbury, Mr — Tony Havering
- Bradley, David — Sidney Livingstone
- Bradley, Jonathan — David Ellison
- Bradley, Mrs — Megs Jenkins
- Braithwaite, Arnie — John Gill
- Braithwaite, David — Ian Bleasdale
- Bramley, Ruth — Olga Grahame
- Brannan, Stewie — Ronald Lacey ("The Last Furlong") and Dinsdale Landen ("Food For Thought")
- Bravington, Mrs — Josephine Antosz
- Brawton, Lord — John Hart Dyke
- Brawton, Lady — Mary Kenton
- Brenda (double-date partner of Tristan) — Eileen Waugh
- Briggs, Barbara — Maggie Norris
- Briggs, Nat — Joe McGann
- Broadbent, Sam — Ashley Barker
- Broadwith, Mrs — Jean Marlow
- Brocklehurst, Rosemary — Emma Hardy
- Brompton, Diana — Georgina Melville
- Brough, Lionel — Johnny Leeze
- Brown, Cliff — David Hargreaves
- Bruce, Andrew — David Quilter
- Buchanan, Calum — John McGlynn
- Buckle, Billy — Paul McLain
- Buckle, Mr — Tom Harrison
- Bull Farmer ("A Cat in Hull's Chance") — Patrick Burke
- Bullen, Major — Norman Shelley ("A Dog's Life") and Mark Kingston ("Cheques and Balances")
- Buller, Colonel — Morris Barry
- Bullivant, Major ("The Bull with the Bowler Hat") — Uncredited
- Bullock, Mr — Roger Walker
- Burns, Mrs — Molly Weir
- Busby, Mr — Harold Goodwin
- Bush, Mr — Alex Robinson
- Bushell, Mr — Bill Lund
- Butler, Mrs — Marjorie Suddell
- Butterfield, Lenny — Tony Cervi
- Buttermere, Lord — Edward Dentith
- Butterworth, Mrs — Kay Mellor
- Butterworth, Wendy — Sarah Stubbs

=== C ===
- Calvert, Mrs — Lorraine Peters
- Calvert, Phineas — Johnny Allan ("Horse Sense") and Alan Partington ("The Healing Touch" and "For Richer, For Poorer")
- Carmody, Richard — Christopher Brown (as Chris Brown)
- Carter, Harold — Ted Moult
- Carter, Mr ("One of Nature's Little Miracles") — John Rapley
- Carter, Mr ("Spring Fever") — Ian Thompson
- Cartwright, Mrs — Audrey Noble
- Casling, Mr — Johnny Allen
- Chandler, Mr — Ivan Beavis
- Chapman, Bert — Brian Osborne
- Chapman, Mrs — Lorraine Peters
- Charlie — John Who
- Charlie ("Matters of Life and Death") — Mike Kelly
- Charlie ("The Nelson Touch" and "Hampered") — James Garbutt
- Clark, Mr — Bert Gaunt
- Clark, Suzie — Samantha Smith
- Clarke, Mary — Jessica Sewell
- Clarke, Mrs — Thora Hird
- Clayton — Peter Wallis
- Clifford, Joan — Suzanne Neve
- Clintock, Henry — Ian Collier
- Clinton — Peter Duncan
- Close, Albert — Burt Brooks
- Coach Driver ("Hail Caesar!") — Mike Wardle
- Coates, Mr — Randal Herley
- Coates, Mrs — Ruth Kettlewell
- Cobb, Humphrey — James Bree
- Coker, Mr — Dave Calderhead
- Collins, Mr — Malcolm Rogers
- Connie (double-date partner of James) — Jean Harrington
- Cooper, Dan (farmer) — Joe Belcher
- Corner, Robert — Noel Cameron
- Cotterell, Paul — Nicholas Courtney
- Courtenay, Basil — Andrew Seear
- Cranford, Isaac (farmer) — Jack Watson
- Crawford, Captain — Paul Brooke
- Crawford, Hugh — Neil Nisbet
- Crawford, Mr — Richard Syms
- Crony — Derek Crewe
- Cropper, Harry — Anthony Addams
- Crossley, Jim — Victor Gilling
- Crump, Albert (farmer) — George A. Cooper
- Crump, Mrs — Pearl Hackney
- Cundall, Ron — Fred Gaunt
- Cundall, Mrs — Joan Campion
- Curate ("Every Dog His Day") — Barry McGinn
- Cyril — Bryn Ellis

=== D ===
- D’Arcy, Brigadier/Colonel — Eric Dodson
- Dakin, Mr — George Malpas
- Dalby, Billy (farmer) — Cyril Appleton
- Dalby, Mrs — Janet Davies
- Dalby, William — Stephen Bratt
- Dance Band ("Out of Practice") — Ernest Tomasso, Jeanne Tomasso, Paul Ripley
- Darnley, Edie — Helen Lindsay
- Darnley, Sybil — Annette Badland
- Davey, Mrs — Kathleen Worth
- David — Nicholas Evans
- Dawson, Horace (farmer) — Joe Holmes
- Dawson, Mr (farmer) — Brian Glover
- Dean, Mr (client) — George Malpas
- Denham, Harold — Martin Matthews
- Dent, Charlie (farmer) — Stan Richards
- Dent, Mr — John Barrett
- Derrick, Bob — Freddie Fletcher
- Derrick, Jean — Sheila Tait
- Dibble, Mr — Ced Beaumont
- Dickson, Henry — Bernard Atha
- Dimmock, Mr — John Comer and Harry Goodier
- Dimmock, Mrs — Margaret Heery
- Dimmock, Nellie/Eleanor — Georgina Eastwood and Jane Clifford
- Dinsdale, Mr — Alan Starkey
- Dinsdale's brother — Wilfrid Brambell
- Dixon (farmer) — Michael Stainton
- Dixon, Jonathan — Peter McCulloch
- Dobbs — Edward Peel
- Dobson, Ted — Ken Kitson
- Dodson, Mr — Johnny Maxfield
- Donovan, Mrs — Sheila Reid
- Dooley, Miss — Avril Angers
- Downs — Glenn Cunningham
- Dowson, Mr — John Ronane ("Breath of Life") and Barry Jackson ("Blood and Water")
- Dryden, Mrs — Olive Pendleton
- Dugdale, Mr — Harry Beety
- Duggleby — Alan Hockey
- Duke of Mannerton — Ernest Clark
- Dumbleby, Mr — Dick Brannick
- Dunn, Matilda — Ann Way
- Dunn, Muriel — Rosamund Greenwood
- Dunning, Dick — Colin Meredith

=== E ===
- Earnshaw — Stan Jay
- Edgeworth, Mr — Bill Lund
- Edmundson, Richard (friend of Helen's) — Norman Mann
- Edmundson, Mr (Richard's father) — John Rolls
- Edna (Mrs Pumphrey's housekeeper) — Anthea Holloway
- Edwards, Mr — Ken Farrington
- Egerton, Margery — Lois Baxter
- Elder, John — Martin Potter
- Emma — Veronica Smart

=== F ===
- Fairburn, Mr — John Biggerstaff
- Farmer ("Brink of Disaster") — Wilfred Grove
- Farmhand ("Attendant Problems") — Russell Denton
- Farmhand ("Pride of Possession") — Tommy Edwards
- Farmhand ("Pups, Pigs and Pickle") — Bill Lund
- Farmer, Angela — Madeline Smith
- Farnon, Siegfried (owner of Skeldale House surgery) — Robert Hardy
- Farnon, Tristan (younger brother of Siegfried) — Peter Davison
- Fawcett, Dick — James Ottaway
- Felicity ("Calf Love") — Uncredited
- Fellowes, Mr — Jackie Shinn
- Fenton, Con — Henry Livings
- Finch, Ned — Robin Parkinson
- First Nurse — Eliza Hunt
- First Owner ("Home and Away") — Martin Oldfield
- Fisher, Caroline — Annie Lambert
- Flaxton, Mr — John Alkin
- Flaxton, Mrs — Fiona Gray
- Forsyth, George — Finetime Fontayne
- Francois (Mrs Pumphrey's butler) — Graham Rowe
- Fred (barman in "Tricks of the Trade") – Terry Pearson
- Fred — Mark Torvic
- Fred ("Big Steps and Little 'Uns") — Joe Figg
- Fred (1985 Christmas Special) — Tommy Harper
- Freddy — Neil Godden
- Fu Manchu — Paul Gee

=== G ===
- Garrett, Mr — Wilfred Grove
- Garston, Jenny — Dorothy Tutin
- George — Mark Blackwell-Baker
- George (postman in "Place of Honour") — Uncredited
- George ("Plenty to Grouse About") — Julian Garlick
- George (barman in "Alarms and Excursions") — Andrew Lane
- George ("The Call of the Wild") — Anthony Wise
- Gibbons, Sep — Duncan Preston
- Gibson — John Evitts
- Gillard, Angela — Elaine Donnelly
- Gillard, Frank — Sam Dale
- Gillard, Mary — Gemma Peers
- Gilling, Mr — Donald Nithsdale
- Gipsy boy ("Out of Practice") — Nicholas Wright
- Gipsy girl ("Out of Practice") — Julie Ibbotson
- Gillard, Marjorie — Sandra Payne
- Gillard, Peter — Jonathan Owen
- Goodman, Dan — Ted Richards
- Grantley, Anne — Madeline Smith
- Greenlaw, Mrs — Judy Wilson
- Gregson, Mr — Donald Morley
- Grier, Angus — Andrew Crawford
- Grier, Mrs — Lucy Griffiths
- Griffiths, Mr — Geoffrey Reed
- Grimes, Bert — Jack Carr
- Grimsdale, Ted — Bryan Pringle

=== H ===
- Hall, Edna (Skeldale House housekeeper) — Mary Hignett
- Hall, Sam — Steve Collins
- Hammond, Mr — Tim Barker
- Hammond, Mrs — Patsy Byrne
- Hamson, Elijah — Peter Davidson
- Hamson, Len — Joe Gladwin
- Handshaw, Arthur (farmer) — Peter Martin
- Handshaw, Eric (farmer) — Ashley Barker
- Harbottle, Miss (Winifred) (Skeldale's first secretary) — Madge Ryan
- Harcourt, Charles — John Ringham
- Hardacre, Ted — Ted Carroll
- Hardwicke, Arthur — Ralph Bowland
- Hardwicke, Ben — Carl Rae
- Harker, Mrs — Anne Jameson
- Harker, Vernon — Rod Arthur
- Harris, Joe — Roger Bingham
- Harris, Simon — Graham Wicinskj
- Harry — David Straun
- Hart, Mr — Michael Bilton
- Hart, Mrs — Veda Warwick
- Hartley, Bill — Peter Martin
- Hatfield, Geoff — Geoffrey Bayldon
- Hawden, Lord — William Fox
- Hawkins, Mary — William Ilkley
- Hawley, Mr — David Miller
- Hazlitt, Barbara — Christine Kavanagh
- Headingley, Deirdre — Josephine Hollis
- Headingley, Major — Hilary Wontner
- Head Lad ("The Last Furlong") – Gordon Reid
- Head Waiter ("Out of Practice") — David Davenport
- Henderson, Wilf — Arnold Peters
- Herriot, Helen (James' wife) — Carol Drinkwater and Lynda Bellingham
- Herriot, James (business partner of Siegfried) — Christopher Timothy
- Herriot, Jimmy — Harry Brayne, Oliver Wilson and Paul Lyon
- Herriot, Rosie — Rebecca Smith and Alison Lewis
- Herron, Mrs — Jean Campbell-Dallas
- Hewison, Mr — Robert Brown
- Hewison, Mrs — Cynthia Etherington
- Hill — Jackie Shinn
- Hinchcliffe, Herbie — Frederick Bennett
- Hindley, George — Keith Marsh
- Hird, Tagger — Stephen Mallatratt
- Hird, Mrs — Pearl Hackney
- Hodgekin, William (Mrs Pumphrey's gardener-servant-chauffeur) — Teddy Turner
- Holroyd, Mrs — Peggy Sinclair
- Hopgood, Jess — Richard Steele
- Hopps, Mr — David Cook
- Horace — Jack Haig
- Horner, Mr — Colin Douglas
- Horner, Mrs — Norah Fulton
- Howell, Mr — Keith Marsh
- Howell, Mrs — Josephine Antosz
- Hubbard, Mrs — Marjorie Suddell
- Hucknall, Jack — Danny Davies
- Hudson, Clem — Tony Capstick
- Hudson, Dick — Nigel Collins
- Hudson, Herbert — James Tear
- Hugill, Fenwick — Bill Rodgers
- Hugill, Thomas — John de Frates
- Hugill, Walter — Roger Grainger
- Hugill, William — Ted Beyer
- Hughie — Tubby Andrews
- Hulton, Lady — Joanna McCallum
- Hulton, Lord — Frederick Treves

=== I ===
- Ingledew, Harold — Frank Mills
- Ingram, Kate — Hannah Thomson
- Inspector Green — John Arthur
- Inspector Halliday — Howard Southern

=== J ===
- Jacques — André Maranne
- Jenkins, Colonel — Bert Parnaby
- Jenkins, Mr — Raymond Witch
- Jeweller — Alan Starkey
- Judith — Sarah Dangerfield

=== K ===
- Katharine — Caroline Webster
- Kealey, Bert — Terry Gilligan
- Kealey, Mrs — Brenda Halbrook
- Kendall, Joe (farmer) — Dickie Arnold
- Kenning, Albert — Malcolm Hebden
- Kirby, Mr — Brian Hayes
- Kitson — John Barrett

=== L ===
- Landlord ("A Friend for Life") — Tony Peers
- Landlord (1983 Christmas Special) — Eddie Caswell
- Landlord (1985 Christmas Special) — D. J. Huckerby
- Landlord of Pub ("Old Dogs, New Tricks") — Chris Collins
- Lawrence, Angela — Hannah Fawcett
- Lawrence, Keith — Martin Matthews
- Len — Barry Hart
- Little Boy ("Cats and Dogs") — Nicholas Wright
- Little Boy ("Alarms and Excursions") — Jason Lockwood
- Little Girl ("Cats and Dogs") — Mollie Walker
- Little Girl ("Alarms and Excursions") — Philippa Lund
- Livingstone, Miss — Hope Johnstone
- Longshaw, Bert — Dave Hill
- Lumsden, Mr — John Whittock
- Lupton, Mr — Anthony Benson
- Lydia — Sue Bond

=== M ===
- Mallaby — Anthony Langdon
- Mallard, Mrs — Barbara Angell
- Mallock, Jeff (knackerman) — Frank Birch (from seasons 1 to 3) and Fred Feast (from series 4 to 7)
- Mallock, Winston — Claude Close
- Man in car ("A Dog's Life") — D. Geoff Tomlinson
- Man on bus ("Horse Sense") — Ted Carroll
- Manton, Joe — Kevin Walton
- Mariner, Tom — Harry Drewry
- Marion — Mary Chester
- Marston, Linda — Dee Sadler
- Marston, Mrs — Sheila Raynor
- Marston, Peter — Will Leighton
- Massingham, Sir William — Kevin Stoney
- Mason, George — Joseph Peters
- Mason, Mr — Geoffrey Bayldon
- Mason, Mrs — June Ellis
- Mavis — Jane Beaumont
- Maxwell, Tom — Peter Ivatts
- Maxwell, Tess — Alex Wilson
- McEwan, Deirdre — Andrea Gibb
- McFeely, Molly — Sharon Twomey
- McTavish, Alice — Elizabeth Millbank
- Meeker, Mr — Michael Brennan
- Mercer, Jane — Lesley Nightingale
- Mercer, Mr — Geoffrey Banks
- Merrick, Hubert — Alan Rothwell
- Metcalfe, Frank — James Lister
- Metcalfe, Mary — Rachel Davies
- Meynell, Mr — Danny James
- Meynell, Mrs — Mary Wray
- Minikin, Mollie — Katharine Page
- Miranda — Aimee Jackson
- Morton, Mr — Simon Carter
- Mottram, Hilary — Jack Watson
- Mount, Deborah (Debbie) — Judi Maynard
- Mount, Caleb — David King ("If Wishes Were Horses") and John Woodvine (1985 Christmas Special)
- Moverley — Stuart Golland
- Mulligan, Joe (client) — Rio Fanning
- Murray — Andrew Robertson
- Murray, Mrs — Catriona Macdonald
- Muriel — Uncredited (bar woman in "Plenty to Grouse About")
- Myatt, Margie — Uncredited
- Myatt, Jess — Michael Holt

=== N ===
- Nellist, Rupe — John Turtle
- Newhouse, Gobber (farmer) — Ivor Salter
- Noakes, Mrs — Joyce Kennedy
- Norman (barman in "Blood and Water") — Jack Featherstone
- Nurse Duggan — Alison Lloyd
- Nurse Brown — Marlene Sidaway

=== O ===
- O'Brian, Nick — Brian McGrath
- Oakley, Percy — Andrew Abrahams
- Ogilvie, Bill — Paul Dawkins
- Ormonroyd, Charlie — John Blain

=== P ===
- Parker, Susie — Francesca Hall
- Partridge, Roland — Geoffrey Bayldon
- Pattison, Kitty — Jayne Lester
- Paul — Nick Timothy
- Pavlechenko, Ludmilla — Kay Woodman
- P.C. Claude Blenkiron — Colin Fay
- P.C. Goole — Steve Haliwell
- P.C. Hicks — Mark Jordon
- P.C. Leach — Stephen Riddle
- P.C. Smith — John Hallett
- Pearson, Jacob — Douglas Ditta
- Peart, Harold — William Ivory
- Pedretti, Franco — Ray Mangion
- Pendlebury, Leslie — Hugh Walters
- Penn, Albert — Robert Garrett
- Perowne, Roderick — William Squire
- Peter — Richard Houlihan
- Pettinger, Mrs — Anna Turner
- Phil — Tim Dantay
- Pianist ("Alarms and Excursions") — Ena Baga
- Pickersgill, Mr — Peter Schofield
- Pickersgill, Olive — Cecily Hobbs
- Pickles, Edge — Mike Kay
- Pilling, Mrs — Anne Raitt
- Pilling, Seth — Malcolm Terris
- Pinkerton, Mr — Alan Hockey
- Plenderleith, Mr — James Bree
- Plenderleith, Mrs — Gabrielle Daye
- Plumb, Miss — Jenny Jay
- Polenov, Captain — Michael Poole
- Potts, Jim — Charles Rea
- Potts, Mrs — Gabrielle Blunt
- Pounder, Mrs — Kristine Howarth
- Pratt, Dennis — Ken Wynne
- Professor Norton — Edward Burnham
- Pub customers ("Horse Sense") — Leslie Sarony, James Ottaway
- Punter ("Home and Away") — Mike Clifton
- Pymm, Mr — John Moore
- Pumphrey, Mrs (aristocratic client of the surgery) — Margaretta Scott
  - Mrs Pumphrey's maid — Mandy Earle

=== R ===
- Raczinski, Dr — Valerie Sarruf
- Ramsey, Bill — Sam Davies
- Randall, Tom — Rodney Litchfield
- Ransom, Major General — Geoffrey Toone
- Ransom, Mrs — Jeanne Mockford
- Raven, Trooper — Steve Hodson
- Raworth, Sarah — Jane Morant
- Ray — John Wild
- Rayner, David — Frank Windsor
- Rayner, Elizabeth — Amanda Waring
- Rayner, Geoffrey — Howard Ward
- Reed, Mr — Johnny Barrs
- Restaurant Diner ("Here and There") — Frank Harling
- Reverend Henty — Jack May
- Reynolds — Tom Harrison
- Ridge, Mrs — Wanda Ventham
- Rigby, Bob — Michael Graham Cox
- Ripley, Mr — Graham Rigby
- Ripley, Mrs — Elizabeth Glennon
- Roper, Mr — Geoffrey Leesley
- Ross, Ewan — Alex McCrindle ("Fair Means and Fowl") and David Ashton ("Old Dogs, New Tricks")
- Ross, Virginia — Gwen Cherrell
- Rudd, Charlie — Gerald James
- Rudd, Maurice — Nial Padden
- Rupe — Danny O'Dea

=== S ===
- Sally ("If Music Be The Food of Love") — Uncredited
- Sam — Philip Whileman
- Sam (1990 Christmas Special) — Steve Sangster
- Sanders, Betty — Gillian Hanna
- Sanders, Jack — James Warrior
- Scargill, Mr — Tom Mennard
- Scott, Jack — Philip Martin Brown
- Scott, Sheila — Natalie Clegg
- Scott, Tony — Ryan O'Neill
- Seaton, Mrs (farmer's wife) — Margaret Heery
- Second Nurse — Katy Feeney
- Second Owner ("Home and Away") — John de Frates
- Sergeant Bannister — Graham Hamilton
- Shadwell, Bill — Howard Goorney
- Shadwell, Joanna — Marian Hutton
- Shadwell, Louise — Rachel James
- Shadwell, Molly — Avril Angers
- Shadwell, Peter — Dominic Guard
- Sharpe, Bert (farmer) — Paul Luty
- Shop assistant ("Be Prepared") — Linda Bardell
- Sidlow — William Abney
- Sidney — Alan Hulse
- Simmons, Mr — Renny Krupinski
- Simon — Joss Brook
- Simpson, Marjorie — Julie Shipley
- Sir Robert — Donald Pickering
- Sister Louise Rose — Jessica Spencer ("Out of Practice") and Irene Sutcliffe ("The New World" and 1985 Christmas Special)
- Skelton, Cornelius — Michael Watkins
- Skelton, Marmaduke — Edward Peel
- Skerry, Albert — William Moore
- Skipton — Edwin Finn
- Skipton, Mr — Tony Melody
- Small boy with puppy ("Judgement Day") — Mitchell Varnam
- Smedley — Danny James
- Smethurst, Mr — Ted Beyer
- Smethick, Mr — John Pickles
- Smith — Arthur Griffiths
- Smithers, Mr — Fred Gaunt
- Smithers (Young) — Charles Booth
- Soames (Lord Hulton's stable master) — George Selway
- Soldier ("Alarms and Excursions") — Graham Hamilton
- Sowden, Mr — Larry Noble
- St. John — Peter Alexander
- Stallholder (1983 Christmas Special) — Anna Turner
- Steven — Andrew Losowsky
- Stockdale, Adam — Paul Grunert
- Stockdale, Bob — Tim Wylton
- Stokes, Barry — David Kershaw
- Stokill, Mr — Al Gillyon
- Stott, Mr — Alan Hulse
- Strong, Oliver — Gordon Gostelow
- Strong, Roland — Walter Sparrow
- Stubbs, Miss — Una Brandon-Jones
- Stubbs, Sammy — Haydn Conway
- Summergill, Arnold — Charles West
- Sumner, Harry (farmer) — Robin Scobey
- Sutcliffe, Mr — Warren Clarke
- Sweetman, Mr — Howard Crossley
- Sweetman, Myra — Maureen Lunt
- Sykes, Mr — Bill Lund

=== T ===
- Tamworth-Brown, Mrs — Betty Turner
- Tanner, Emma — Lynne Ross
- Tanner, Simon — Stephen Dudley
- Tansy, Jack — Robert Falconer
- Tansy, Mr — Tony Havering
- Taverner, Dick — Glyn Owen
- Taverner, Julia — Caroline Holdaway
- Taverner, Beatrice — Pamela Gale
- Taylor, Bob — Mark Botham
- Trueman, Freddie — Bill Cashmore
- Rachel Taylor — Tracy-Jane White
- Teasdale, Mr — John Taylor
- Ted (first barman of the Drovers Arms) — Michael Shannon
- Temple, Alice — Mollie Maureen
- Thompson, Miss — Anna Turner
- Thornton, Susie — Judy Brooke
- Thwaite, Tommy — John Rutland
- Thwaites, Mr — Joe Belcher
- Tibbett, Mrs — Annie Leon
- Tilson, Mrs — Elaine Donnelly
- Tolly — John Pennington
- Tom ("The Beauty of the Beast") — John Kellett
- Tom ("Faint Hearts") — Danny O'Dea
- Tommy — Derry Jordan
- Tompkins, Mrs — Anthea Holloway
- Travers, Roddy — Patrick Troughton ("Hair of the Dog") and James Ellis ("In Whom We Trust")
- Trenholm, Mary — Vivien Keene
- Trenholm, Peter — James Norris
- Tremayne, Colonel — Anthony Dawes
- Tremayne, Mrs — Jean Fergusson
- Truscott, Glenys — Colette Stevenson
- Tyreman, Cliff — Tony Sympson

=== U ===
- Umpire ("The Name of the Game") — Ken Hastwell
- Umpire ("Big Fish, Little Fish") — George Tunstall
- Unwin, Gordon — Geoff Oldham

=== V ===
- Van driver ("Plenty to Grouse About") — Malcolm Raeburn
- Vaughan, Susan — Sabina Franklyn
- Vera — Sharon Cheyne
- Vicar ("A Friend for Life") — Glenn Cunningham
- Vicar (1990 Christmas Special) — Aubrey Phillips
- Vine, Andrew — Trevor Ainsley

=== W ===
- Wain, Bernard — Peter Benson
- Wain, Mary-Jane — Ruth Holden
- Waiter ("Knowin' How to Do It") — Jack Featherstone
- Waiter (1985 Christmas Special) — Sean Glenn
- Wakeman, Major — Roger Brierley
- Warrington, Bill — Trevor Nelson
- Watson, Terry — Peter Lorenzelli
- Watson, Mrs — Hilary Trott
- Weeting, Brian — Paul Clayton
- Weeting, Dennis — Paul Butterworth
- Weeting, Mr — Terry Waddington
- Wellerby, Mr — Reg Lever
- Wenlow, Silas — Richard Cole
- Westby, Jane — Rebecca Sowden
- Westby, Mrs — Amanda Waldy
- Westby, Sarah — Kathryn Barry
- Westerman, Miss — Joan Young
- Wheatley, Mrs — Enid Irvin
- White, Mr (farmer) — Johnny Maxfield
- Whitehead, George — Edward Phillips
- Whithorn, Mr — Edwin Richfield
- Whithorn, Mrs — Jenny Laird
- Wiggins, Mr — Ray Mort
- Wiggs, Albert — Alan Helm
- Wilf ("Puppy Love") — Dene Edwards
- Wilf ("The Playing Field") — Mark Shorto
- Wilkey, Reg — Charles Pemberton
- Wilkin, Seb — Richard Mapletoft
- Wilkinson, Mr — Terry Cantor
- Willis, Mr — Alan Hulse
- Willis, Tom — David Theakston
- Wilson, Mr — Jeff Nuttall
- Wireless announcer (voice, 1990 Christmas Special) — Frank Windsor
- Witchell, Sam — Preston Lockwood
- Woman with pony ("Judgement Day") — Gillian McClements
- Woodley, David — Craig McFarlane
- Worley, Mr (barman) — Nicholas McArdle
- Worrall, Sally — Rosalind Wilson

=== Y ===
- Young Man — Ray Boot
- Young Woman — Kate Kitovitz
- Youth ("Home and Away") — David Clayforth

== Recurring characters ==
Several farmers make recurring appearances throughout the series. Mr Biggins (John Sharp) is a notorious payment-dodger who regularly attempts to procure free service out of the practice, as well as decrying the cost of the vets' visits. In one episode he calls Herriot out to question a bill charge from 18 months earlier. On another occasion, in exchange for Herriot's assistance with a puncture on his car, Biggins agrees to settle his account. Little does Herriot know that Biggins post-dated the cheque. Biggins' first name is revealed to be Ezra in the series 7 episode "If Music Be the Food of Love". "John Sharp was just like you see him," recalled Peter Davison. "He was a wonderful raconteur and would tell you these long stories." Christopher Timothy added: "I found myself getting quite moved when I watched an episode recently, not because of what we were doing, but because all those lovely people are no longer with us. John Sharp was a lovely, lovely man."

Bill Hartley (Peter Martin, who also plays Arthur Handshaw in series 1 and 2), meanwhile, is a relatively good-natured client, compared to the perpetually disgruntled Ted Grimsdale (Bryan Pringle). "Peter Martin was fantastic," remembered Peter Davison. "He was mainly known then for the Jewson commercials. He was just very funny. He played two parts for us over the years."

Fellmonger Jeff Mallock (Frank Birch from series 1 to 3 and Fred Feast from series 4 to 7) is regularly waiting in the wings to take ailing livestock to his knacker's yard. Whatever the vets' diagnosis, Mallock always thinks the real reason is "stagnation o' t'lung".

Fellow vet Granville Bennett (James Grout), a cat and dog specialist, is often on hand to help out with the more severe small animal cases. His enjoyment of alcohol is always of a concern for James, however, who regularly ends up inebriated and making a fool of himself in front of Bennett's wife, Zoe (Pamela Salem), whom he always thought considered him a dipsomaniac. "One of the guest characters we both adored was Granville Bennett, from whom James never escaped without being utterly plastered," recalled Sandy Byrne, the widow of writer Johnny Byrne. "He was played by James Grout, who was wonderful! He very much enjoyed writing for Mrs Pumphrey and Hodgekin too."

As evidenced by Peter Martin above, several actors played more than one character throughout the course of the series; none more so than Bill Lund, who played four people: Mr Sykes in "Fair Means and Fowl", a farmhand in "Pups, Pigs and Pickle", Mr Edgeworth in the 1985 Christmas Special and Mr Bushell in "Hail Caesar!".

Geoffrey Bayldon played three characters: Roland Partridge in "Pride of Possession", Mr Mason in the 1983 Christmas Special and confectioner Geoff Hatfield in "Where Sheep May Safely Graze".

Anna Turner also played three characters: Miss Thompson in "Big Steps and Little 'Uns", a stall holder in the 1983 Christmas Special and Mrs Pettinger in "A Cat in Hull's Chance".

Jack Watson played two cantankerous characters: farmer Isaac Cranford in "Nothing Like Experience" and vet Hilary Mottram in "One of Nature's Little Miracles". He reprised the role of Cranford in the 1990 Christmas Special.

Others who played two or more characters:

- Alan Starkey: Mr. Dinsdale in "A Dog's Life" and a jeweller in "One of Nature's Little Miracles" and "The Pig Man Cometh"
- Alan Hockey: Duggleby in "Brink of Disaster" and Mr Pinkerton in "Barks and Bites"
- Ashley Barker: Eric Handshaw in "Dog Days", Sam Broadbent in "Practice Makes Perfect" and Len Birtwhistle in "A Present From Dublin" and "The New World"
- Joby Blanshard: Mr Bailes in "Pig in the Middle" and Mr Bellerby in "Faint Hearts"
- Anthea Holloway: Mrs Tompkins in "Faint Hearts". Three series later, she plays Mrs Pumphrey's housemaid, Edna
- George Malpas: Mr Dean in "Dog Days" and Mr Dakin in "The Bull with the Bowler Hat"
- Joe Belcher: Dan Cooper in "Dog Days" and Mr Thwaites in "Only One Woof"
- Enid Irvin: Mrs Allen in "Sleeping Partners" and Mrs Wheatley in "For Richer, For Poorer"
- Alan Hulse: Mr Willis in "Hair of the Dog" and Mr Stott in "The Pig Man Cometh"
- Pearl Hackney: Mrs Crump in "Calf Love" and Mrs Hird in "Choose a Bright Morning"
- Avril Angers: Miss Dooley in "Pups, Pigs and Pickle" and Molly Shadwell in "A Friend for Life"
- Barry Jackson: Ken Billings in "Matters of Life and Death" and Mr Dowson in "Blood and Water"
- Madeline Smith: Angela Farmer in "Pride of Possession" and Anne Grantley in the 1983 Christmas Special
- Katharine Page: Aunt Lucy in "Golden Lads and Girls" and Mollie Minikin in "Only One Woof"
- Fine Time Fontayne: George Forsyth in the 1985 Christmas Special and Joe Bentley in "A New Chapter"
- Tony Capstick: Fred Allan in "In Whom We Trust" and Clem Hudson in the 1985 Christmas Special
- June Ellis: Mrs Bellerby in "Faint Hearts" and Mrs Mason in "The New World"
- Michael Lees: Mr Bond in "Cats and Dogs" and Colonel Bosworth in "The Healing Touch"
- Peter Ivatts: Mr Blackburn in "A Dying Breed" and Tom Maxwell in "The Bull With the Bowler Hat" and "Against the Odds"
- James Bree: Mr Plenderleith in "Out of Practice" and Humphrey Cobb in "The Bull With the Bowler Hat"
- Danny O'Dea: Tom in "Faint Hearts" and Rupe in "The Pig Man Cometh"
- Graham Hamilton: a soldier in "Alarms and Excursions" and Sergeant Bannister in the 1983 Christmas Special
- Danny James: Smedley in "Dog Days" and Mr Meynell in "The Jackpot"
- John Barrett: Kitson in "Breath of Life" and Mr Dent in "Every Dog His Day"
- Keith Marsh: George Hindley in "Will to Live" and Mr Howell in "The Prodigal Returns"
- Dickie Arnold: Joe Kendall in "Nothing Like Experience" and "A Dog's Life" and Will in "The Pig Man Cometh"
- Tom Harrison: Reynolds in "Dog Days", Eli Bagley in "Bulldog Breed" and Mr. Buckle in "One of Nature's Little Miracles"
- Edward Peel: Dobbs in "Barks and Bites" and Marmaduke 'Duke' Skelton in "Fair Means and Fowl"
- Martin Matthews: Mr Denham in "Ways and Means" and Keith Lawrence in "A Cat in Hull's Chance"
- Marjorie Sudell: Mrs Butler in "Tricks of the Trade" and Mrs Hubbard in the 1983 Christmas Special
- Bill Lund: Mr. Sykes in "Pups, Pigs and Pickle" and Mr. Bushell in "Hail Caesar!"

"They used some genuine Yorkshire characters to play the farmers," recalled Sandy Byrne, "so [Johnny] relished writing for them because they were so quirky and funny." Robert Hardy concurs: "What I think made the thing a success was those Yorkshire and Lancashire actors we had playing the farmers. They were wonderful. They lent a real authenticity to their stuff, farmers complaining about their bills and all that."

Ted Moult, who played Harold Carter, was a real farmer in the 1940s but became a radio and television personality in the mid-1960s. He committed suicide in 1986, aged 60, after a period of depression after several weeks of wet weather that worried arable farmers.

In addition to the roles of Helen Herriot, her children and Jeff Mallock, a few characters were played by more than one actor:

- Dr Harry Allinson: John Grieve in "Bulldog Breed" and Richard Butler (uncredited) in "The Nelson Touch"
- Charlie (Lord Hulton's estate worker): Mike Kelly in "Matters of Life and Death" and James Garbutt in "The Nelson Touch" and "Hampered"
- Hilda Biggins: Kathleen Helme and Margaret Jackman
- Kit Bilton: Gorden Kaye and Bill Croasdale
- Mr Bond: Michael Lees in "Cats and Dogs" and Kenneth Cranham in "Call of the Wild" (mute and uncredited)
- Stewie Brannan: Ronald Lacey and Dinsdale Landen
- Major Bullen: Norman Shelley and Mark Kingston
- Phineas Calvert: Johnny Allan and Alan Partington
- Mr Dimmock: John Comer and Harry Goodier
- Eleanor "Nellie" Dimmock: Georgina Eastwood and Jane Clifford
- Mr Dowson: John Ronane and Barry Jackson
- Caleb Mount: Dave King and John Woodvine
- Ewan Ross: Alex McCrindle and David Ashton. The character was based on Frank Bingham, Brian Sinclair's first assistant. Bingham died "like many good vets, in a cow byre doing a tough job."
- Sister Rose: Jessica Spencer and Irene Sutcliffe
- Roddy Travers: Patrick Troughton and James Ellis
