= Catherine Feeney =

Catherine Feeney (or variants) may refer to

- Catherine Feeny (born 1976), American singer-songwriter
- Catherine Feeney, musician in Never the Bride
- Katherine Feeney (radio presenter) (born 1988), Australian radio presenter and journalist
- Katie Feeney, American social media personality
- Sally Forrest (1928–2015), born Katherine Feeney, American actress
- Kathryn Feeney, guest on Dustin's Daily News
- Katy Feeney (1949–2017), baseball executive
- Katy Feeney, a character in the TV series All Creatures Great and Small
