= Frederick Bennett =

Frederic(k) or Fred Bennett may refer to:

- Fred Bennett (born 1983), American football player
- Fred Bennett (baseball) (1902–1957), MLB outfielder
- Fred Bennett (footballer) (1906–1990), English footballer
- Frederic Bennett (1918–2002), English journalist, barrister and Conservative Party Member of Parliament
- Frederick Bennett (bishop) (1872–1950), New Zealand Anglican bishop
- Frederick Debell Bennett (1806–1859), English ship surgeon and biologist
- Frederick Bennett (actor) on List of All Creatures Great and Small (TV series) characters
