= Charles Clifford (photographer) =

Welsh photographer based mainly in Spain (1820–1863)

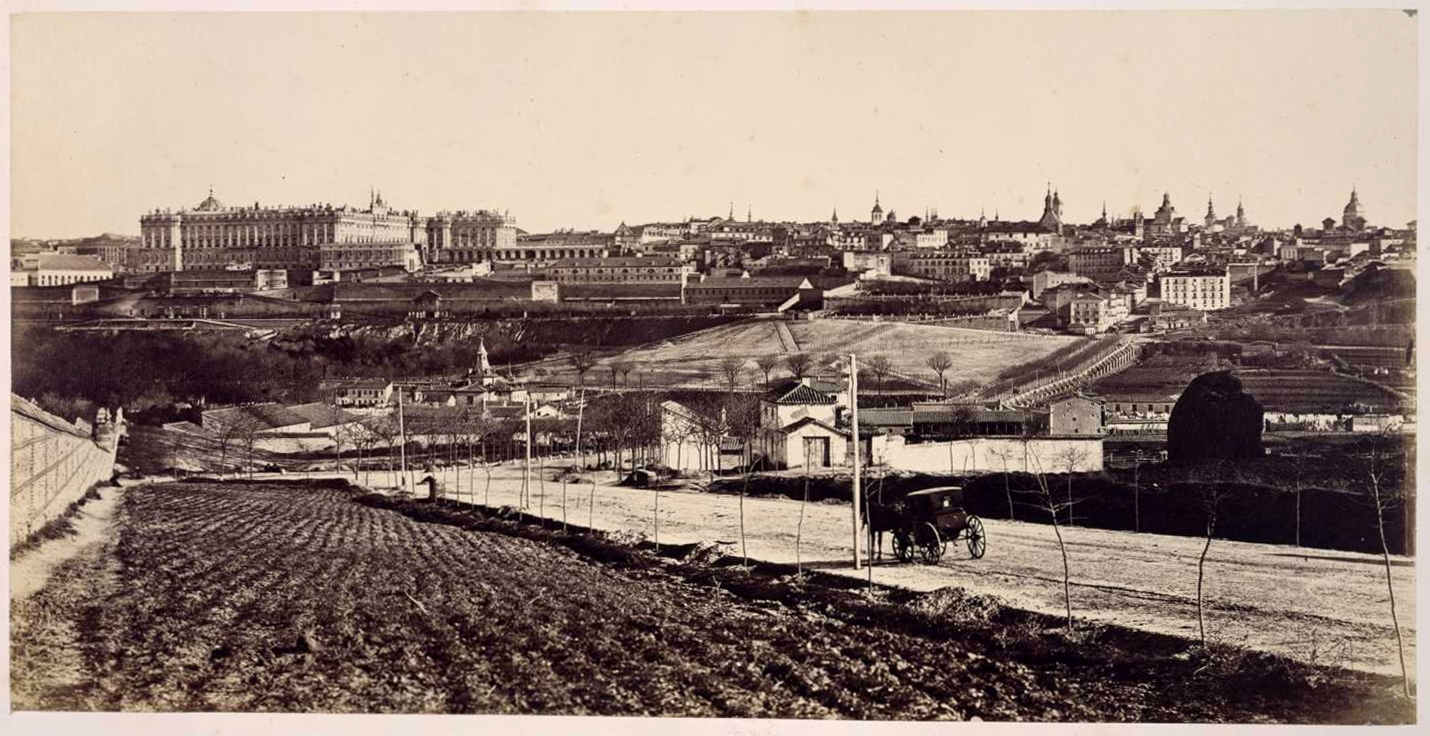
Madrid visto desde el oeste, Charles Clifford, c. 1860

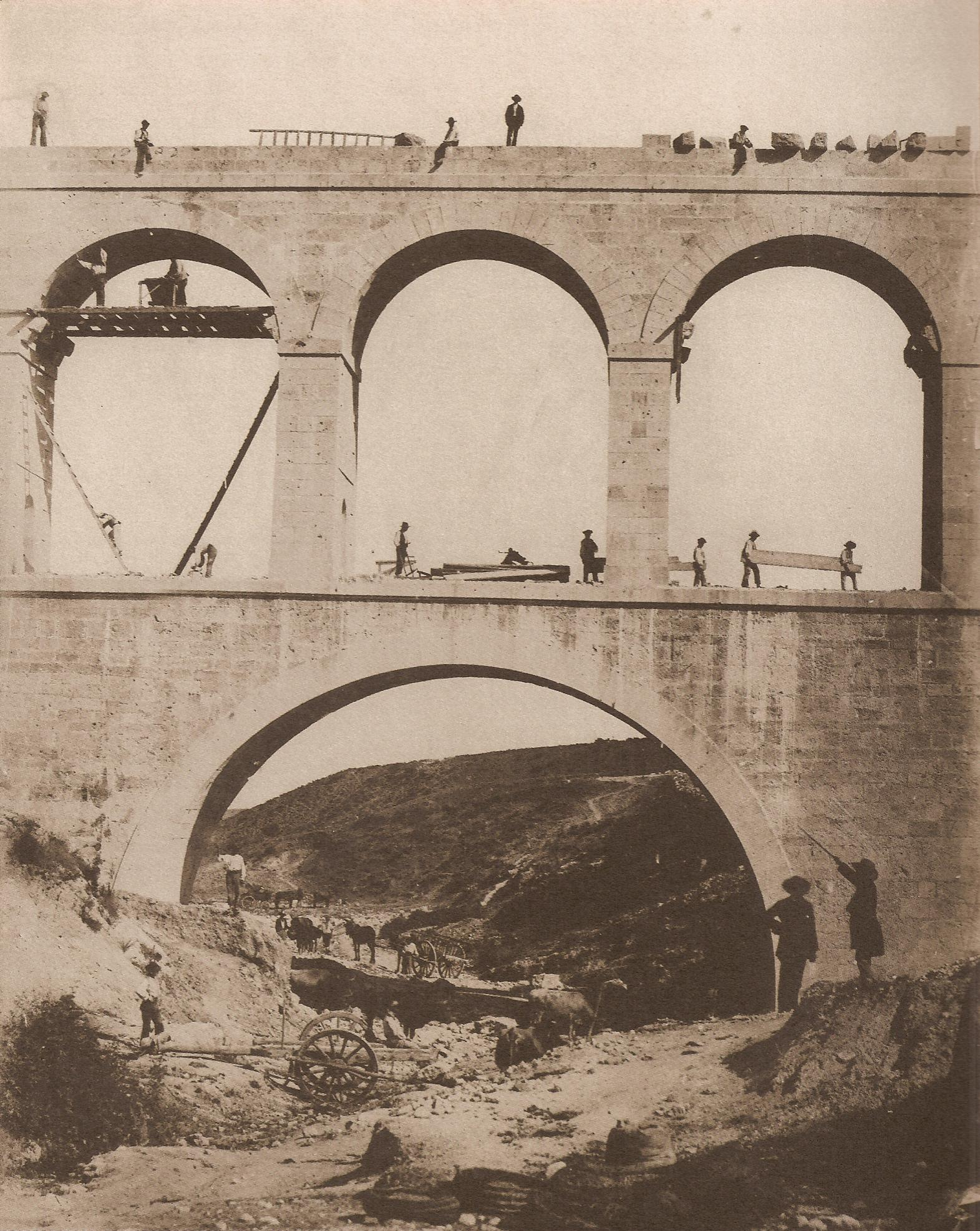
Obras del Canal de Isabel II: Acueducto de la Sima, Charles Clifford, 1855

Charles Clifford (Wales, c. 1820 – Madrid, 1 January 1863) was a Welsh photographer based mainly in Spain.

Clifford, known mostly for his daguerreotype, calotype and wet plate collodion images of scenes from around Spain, he was, together with the French photographer, Jean Laurent, one of the leading photographers of his day in Spain.

Queen Victoria and Prince Albert are known to have purchased some of Clifford's Spanish photographs in 1854, and in 1861, he published two volumes, containing a series of 159 prints commissioned by Queen Victoria, Prince Albert, the King and Queen of Spain, the Emperors of France, Russia and Austria, the Duc de Montpensier, among others.

Although known mainly for his collections of photographs of landscapes, monuments and public works, he was commissioned to carry out a portrait of Queen Victoria at Windsor Castle (her notes in her Journal for 14 November 1861 state she was "dressed in evening dress, with diadem & jewels" and was "photographed for the Queen of Spain by Mr Clifford. He brought me one of hers, taken by him". It was possibly one of the last portraits taken of the queen wearing a colour), and was also named Court Photographer to the Queen of Spain, accompanying her on the royal tour of Andalucia in 1862.

== Biography ==
Not much is known about his early life, but by November 1850, he was running a photographic portrait gallery in Madrid, accompanied by his wife, Jane Clifford, also a photographer.

He is buried in the British Cemetery in Madrid.

== Works ==
Most of the original copies of his works are held at the Biblioteca Nacional de España, the Palacio Real de Madrid and the Museo del Prado, but some are also to be found in the Museo de Historia de Madrid, the Museo Frederic Marès in Barcelona, and the archives of Universidad de Navarra.

== Bibliography ==
- Fontanella, Lee, Clifford en España. Un fotógrafo en la corte de Isabel II, Madrid, El Viso, 1999. ISBN 978-84-95241-06-1.
- Piñar Samos, Javier y Sánchez Gómez, Carlos. «Clifford y los álbumes de la Academia», Academia: Boletín de la Real Academia de Bellas Artes de San Fernando, núm. 98 y 99, primer y segundo semestre de 2004, págs. 9-52.
- Sougez, Marie-Loup, Historia de la Fotografía, Madrid, Cátedra, 2004. ISBN 84-376-0288-2.
