= Jane Clifford =

British photographer who worked in Spain

- Born: 1821 or 1822; Unknown
- Died: Unknown
- Occupation: Collodion process photographer
- Known for: Photographing the Dauphin's Treasure in the Museo del Prado, Madrid
- Spouse: Charles Clifford

Jane Clifford (born 1821 or 1822) was a British photographer who worked in Spain in the 1850s and 1860s. She is best known for her photographs on behalf of the Victoria and Albert Museum, London of the Dauphin's Treasure, which was held in the collection of the Royal Museum, Madrid (now the Museo del Prado).

== Early life ==
Clifford was born in 1821 or 1822. The exact place of her birth is not known. In 1850 she arrived in Spain with her husband, the Welsh photographer Charles Clifford. It appears that prior to arriving in Spain they were living in Bordeaux, France, where her husband was director of the hippodrome. Together they ran a photography studio in Madrid under the name El Daguerreotipo Inglés. When the studio photography business began to dwindle in the face of competition from local photographers, the Cliffords travelled outside Madrid to seek clients and to photograph cities and historical monuments.

== Career ==
Soon after their arrival they partnered with Arthur Goulston, a hot air balloonist, to contract with the Plaza de Toros bullfighting ring to ascend in a balloon on four bullfighting days. It was originally contracted that one of the Cliffords would be mounted on a bull or a horse but this did not take place, possibly leaving them out of pocket for being in breach of contract. They did, however, take photographs from the balloon although none appears to have survived. Strangely, the contract stated that neither her husband nor anybody else had obliged her to ascend in the balloon and that she "freely and spontaneously" agreed to participate in the show. Charles Clifford would later write about the trip as follows:

We had just crossed (the clouds) when all of us, particularly my wife, had the indescribable pleasure of reaching a serene blue sky and enjoying for a moment the bright and relaxing rays of the sun. […] In the vast space ahead of us, looking down, we could only see a huge sea of undulating clouds, white as snow and similar to a frozen polar ocean.

— La Patria, January 17 1851

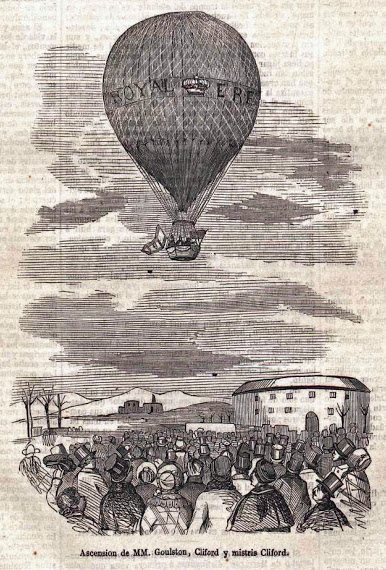
18 January 1851 illustration of the balloon ride

The absence of a personal signature on her work makes it difficult to know which were the photographs of Clifford and which were her husband's. However, it was clear that she was regarded as a distinguished photographer as, in 1856, she was the first woman to be admitted to the Société française de photographie (SFP), which had been founded two years earlier. Both she and her husband were received by the Spanish Royal Family, and he took many photographs of members of the Crown, accompanying the King and Queen on two of their tours. He died in 1863, and she continued the work of the studio under the same name. She completed the work on 30 copies of a photographic album of Andalusia and Murcia, which had been left unfinished by her husband, and continued the publication of monumental views of Spain that he had started. At the studio she mainly specialised in portraits.

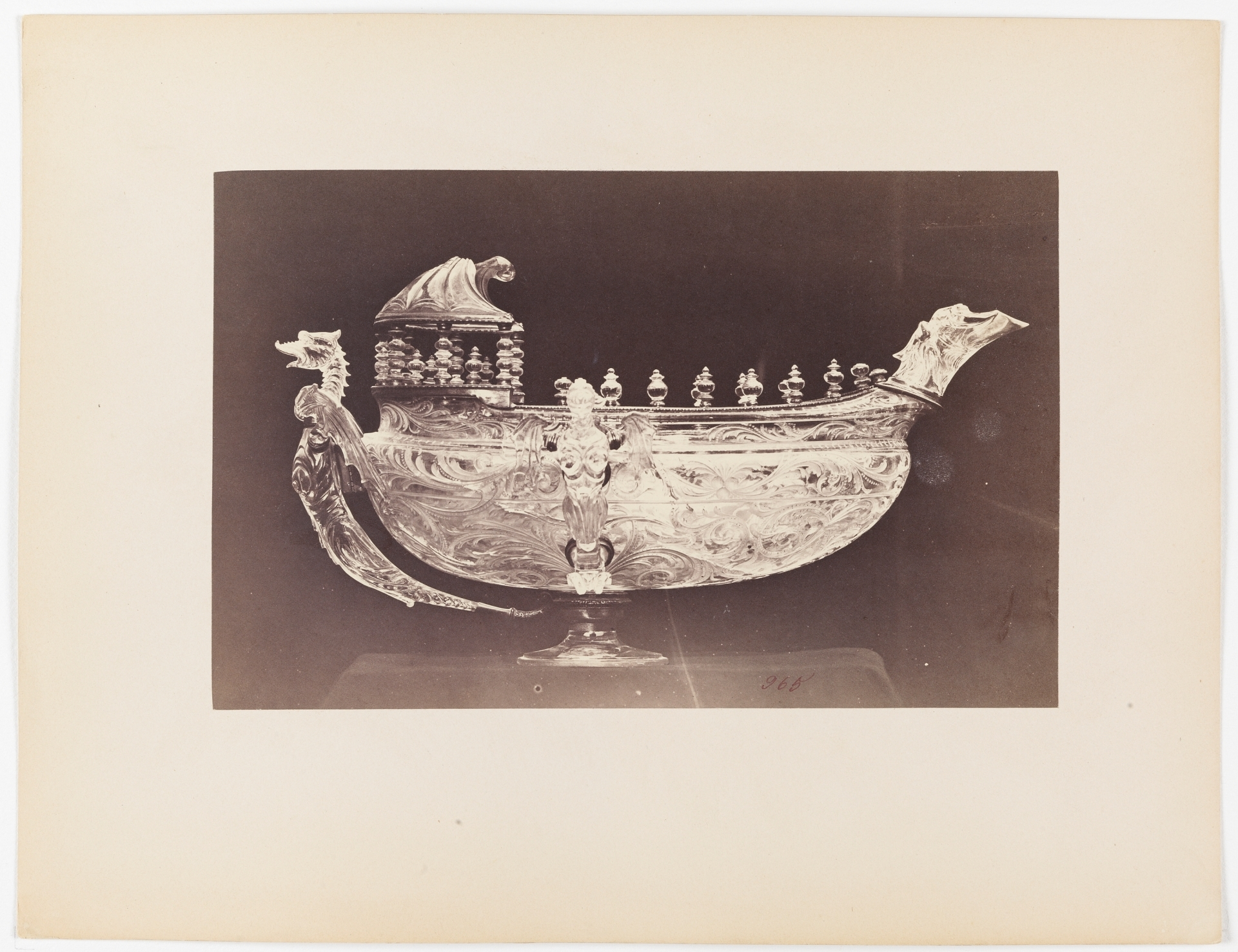
One of Clifford's photos of the Dauphin's Treasure

After being approached by Clifford with sample photographs of armour from the Spanish Royal Armoury, Sir John Charles Robinson, curator of the South Kensington Museum in London (now the Victoria and Albert Museum), initially purchased 80 photographs of armour. He then commissioned her in November 1863 to photograph the works that made up the Dauphin's Treasure, located in Madrid's Royal Museum of Paintings in Madrid, now the Museo del Prado. Robinson visited Madrid at the end of 1863 and beginning of 1864 and it is likely that it was during this period that he commissioned Clifford to do the work. The Treasure is a collection of vessels of rock crystal and decorative hardstones embellished with gold and silver mounts, precious gems and pearls. It was inherited by Philip V of Spain from his father, Louis, Grand Dauphin of France. Clifford did not sign any photographs with her own name leading some to suggest that the armoury photos had been reprinted from earlier photographs by her husband.

In their Madrid studios, Clifford and her husband had adapted to using the latest photographic techniques. Initially this was the daguerreotype and from around 1852 the calotype. From 1856 their studio abandoned the calotype and started to use the collodion process, which gave greater clarity to the images. This would be the technique she used to photograph the Dauphin's Treasure. Photographing objects found in the treasure and successfully reproducing their details and qualities was a challenge that required a mastery of the photographic technique. She took the photographs of the treasure outdoors, in the courtyards of the museum, using wet collodion glass negatives. From these negatives she obtained positives on paper, by contact. The collodion technique required that the plate remain wet throughout the development and image-taking process so Clifford, like other photographers of the time, had to take her photography laboratory with her to prepare the plate before taking the picture and develop it immediately afterwards. The technical data of her photographs of the treasure includes the technique "albumen on photographic paper". Finally, the photographs were glued onto cardboard. Unlike other later photographers of the treasure, Clifford portrayed each piece individually, except in one case.

She kept the negatives of her photographs of the Dauphin's Treasure, and sold copies of the positives to the South Kensington Museum, the Museo del Prado and the Gothenburg Museum of Art in Sweden, as well as to the National Heritage of Spain. Her work has made it possible to see some pieces that are now missing from the collection, and to see in their entirety others that were stripped of their fittings after the theft of the Treasure in 1918. Because they were taken prior to the first cleaning and restoration of the treasure, in 1866, they are the only record of the condition the collection was in before that time.

== Death ==
There is no information about Clifford's death date or the location. Her presence in Madrid is documented until 1866. Her name was removed from the list of members of the SFP in 1885. Although her husband was buried in the British Cemetery in Madrid, there is no evidence that she was also buried there. Her husband was one of the first subscribers to the cemetery and she continued with the annual subscriptions for a time after his death.
