= Cine Proyecciones =

Cinema in Madrid, Spain

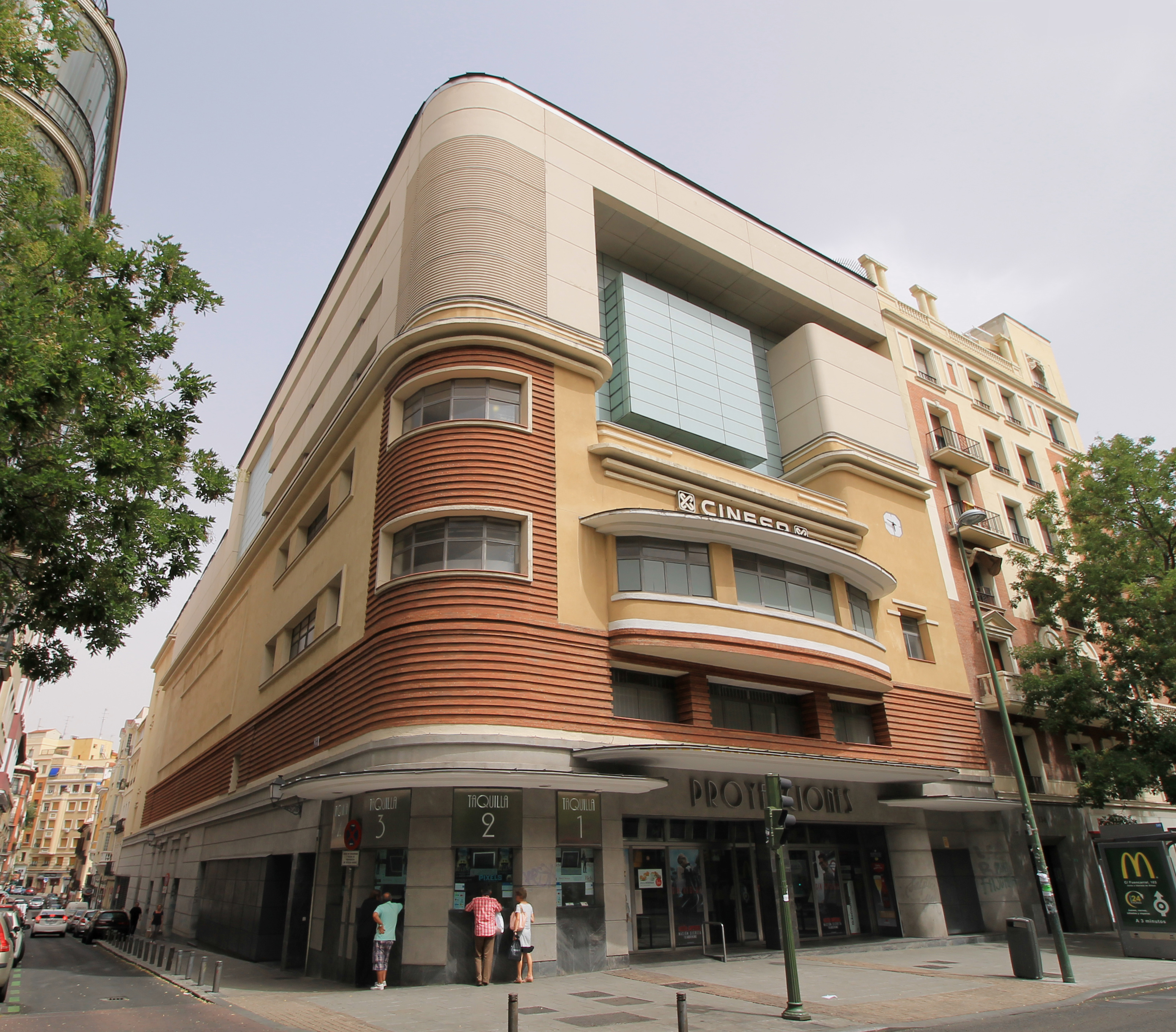
- Interactive map of Cine Proyecciones
- Address: Calle de Fuencarral, 136; Madrid, Spain
- Coordinates: 40.431413°N 3.703237°W
- Operator: Cinesa
- Type: multiplex

Construction
- Opened: 21 December 1932

Cine Proyecciones, also known under the commercial name Cinesa Proyecciones, is a cinema in Madrid, Spain.

The building is located in Calle de Fuencarral, in between the roundabouts of Bilbao and Quevedo. Built in an Art Deco style, it was inaugurated on 21 December 1932 with a screening of Palmy Days. It underwent renovations to adapt to Cinerama, thereby re-opening in 1964 (henceforth becoming one of the only three cinemas in Madrid with the aforementioned system). As of 1970, it featured 1,487 seats. It was reformed in 2004 by Rafael de La-Hoz. Transformed into a multiplex, as of 2015 it had 8 screens and 1,800 seats.
