= Allegory of the City of Madrid =

Painting by Francisco Goya

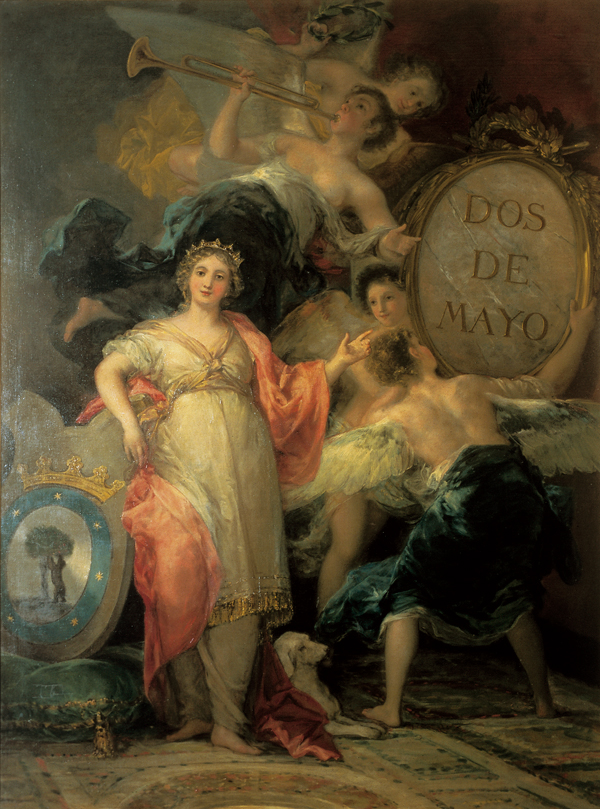
- Artist: Francisco Goya
- Year: 1810
- Type: Oil on canvas
- Dimensions: 260 cm × 195 cm (100 in × 77 in)
- Location: Museo de Historia de Madrid; Madrid

Allegory of the City of Madrid is an 1810 oil painting by the Spanish artist Francisco Goya presenting an allegory of Madrid, the capital of the Kingdom of Spain. The painting was produced during the Peninsular War, when Goya received patronage from the French-installed monarch Joseph Bonaparte. After the final liberation of Spain in 1813 by Allied forces led by the Duke of Wellington, Goya added the words commemorating the Dos de Mayo Uprising of 1808. Goya also famously portrayed the failed uprising against the French occupiers in two paintings The Second of May and The Third of May. Today the work is in the Museo de Historia de Madrid.

== See also ==
- List of works by Francisco Goya

== Bibliography ==
- Boime, Albert. A Social History of Modern Art, Volume 2: Art in an Age of Bonapartism, 1800-1815. University of Chicago Press, 1993.
- Tomlinson, Janis. Goya: A Portrait of the Artist. Princeton University Press, 2022.
