= Ina Clough =

- Born: 10 November 1920; Bournemouth, England
- Died: 25 January 2003 (aged 82); Great Crosby, Sefton, Merseyside, England
- Years active: 1971–2002

Ina Clough (10 November 1920 – 25 January 2003) was an English character and bit-part actress.

Clough's first filmed role was in the Mike Leigh film Bleak Moments (1971), and she later appeared on television in Z-Cars (1971), All Creatures Great and Small (1988), Last of the Summer Wine (1986/1988), Cracker (1994), Hetty Wainthropp Investigates (1996) and Coronation Street (1997). Film credits include FairyTale: A True Story (1997) and This Filthy Earth (2001).

== Filmography ==
- Bleak Moments (1971)
- FairyTale: A True Story (1997) - Lady Calling to Fairies
- This Filthy Earth (2001) - Armandine

== Television ==
- Z-Cars, Eps. "The Taker" (1971) - Mrs Smedley
- Play for Today, Ep. "The Bouncing Boy" (1972) - Mrs Gee
- Life for Christine (1980) - Mrs Holly
- All Creatures Great and Small, Ep. "A Present from Dublin" (1988) - Mrs Birtwhistle
- Last of the Summer Wine, Ep. "Crums" (1988) - Lady Passerby
- Medics, 1 Ep. (1992) - Mrs Cator
- The Weekenders (1992) - Seepage Seller
- Hetty Wainthropp Investigates, Ep. "Runaways" (1996) - Bessie
- Coronation Street, 1 Eps. (1997) - Mrs Laight
- Linda Green, Eps. "Focus" (2002) - Elderly Woman
