= Real Hospicio de San Fernando =

Royal Hospice of San Fernando
- Real Hospicio de San Fernando (Spanish)
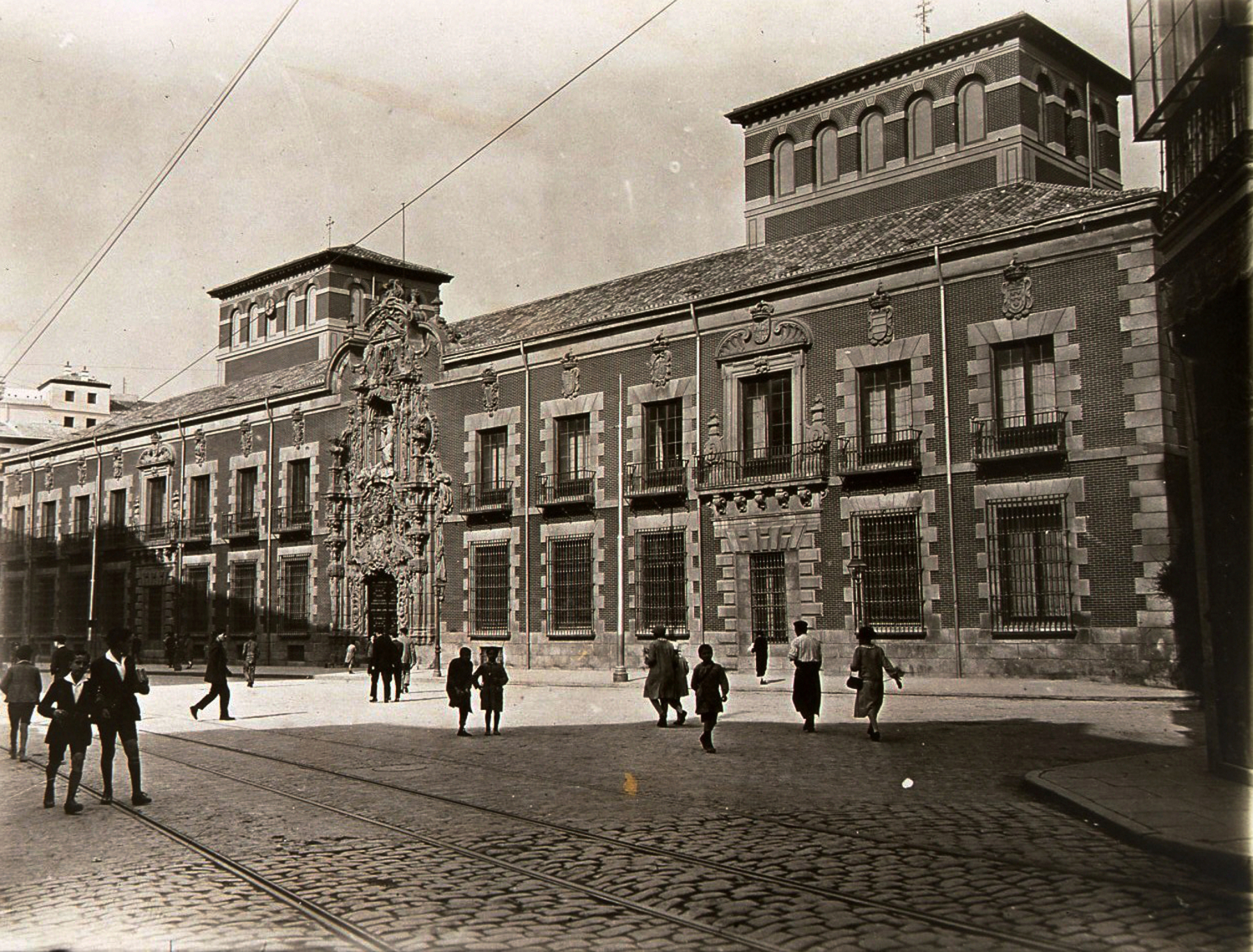

- Location within Spain
- 40.42581°N 3.700837°W
- Location: Madrid, Spain

History
- Built: 1726

Site notes
- Architect: Pedro de Ribera
- Architectural style: baroque

Spanish Cultural Heritage
- Official name: Real Hospicio de San Fernando
- Type: Non-movable
- Criteria: Monument
- Designated: 1919
- Reference no.: RI-51-0000169

The Royal Hospice of San Fernando (Spanish: Real Hospicio de San Fernando) is a former hospice located in Madrid, Spain.

The building now houses the Museo de Historia de Madrid. It was first declared historical-artistic monument in 1919 and Bien de Interés Cultural in 1985.

Among the boys from poor families living there in the 19th century was Pablo Iglesias, who would later become a founder of Socialism in Spain, and Iglesias' younger brother who would die young of tuberculosis.
