= Pete Ivatts =

English actor

Peter Ivatts
- Born: England
- Occupation: Actor
- Years active: 1978–present
- Website: www.peteivatts.com

Peter Ivatts is an English actor whose career has spanned over forty years. He has mainly appeared in British television series.

His first appearance was in a 1972 episode of Coronation Street as Sid Bolton.

In 1978 he appeared in The Sandbaggers. Four years later, he had minors role in Strangers and Juliet Bravo. After a few more similar roles, he appeared in five episodes of One by One as "Harry".

In 1980 he appeared as Mr. Blackburn, a farmer, in an episode of All Creatures Great and Small entitled "A Dying Breed".

In 1982 he appeared as a policeman in How We Used to Live. Three years later he appeared as another character, Fred Marshall.

In March 1984 he appeared as driving instructor Alan Livesey in Coronation Street.

Another run of bit-parts ensued, before he returned, in 1988, to All Creatures, this time as farmer Tom Maxwell. He appeared in the episodes "The Bull With the Bowler Hat" and "Against the Odds".

After several small roles, he appeared in twelve episodes of Heartbeat as Bill Galloway and three episodes of Last of the Summer Wine.

In November 2019, he appeared in an episode of the BBC soap opera Doctors as Ted Nelson.
