= Madrid History Museum =

- Museo de Historia de Madrid

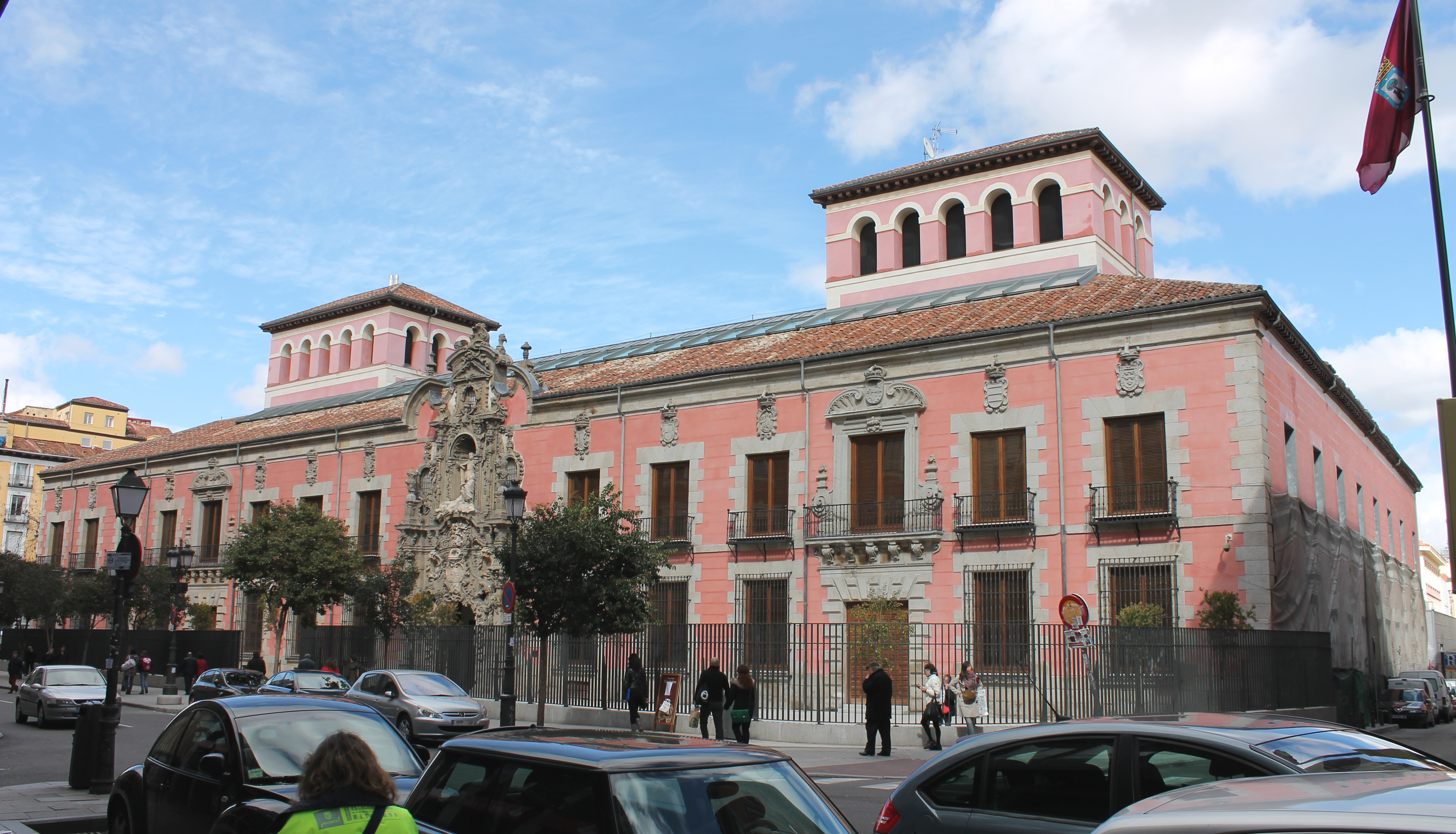
- View of the museum from Calle Fuencarral
- Established: 1929
- Location: Real Hospicio de San Fernando, Calle de Fuencarral 78, Madrid, Spain
- Coordinates: 40°25′33″N 3°42′03″W
- Type: History museum
- Owner: Ayuntamiento de Madrid
- Public transit access: Tribunal
- Website: www.madrid.es/museodehistoria

Madrid History Museum (Spanish: Museo de Historia de Madrid)) is a history museum located on Calle de Fuencarral in downtown Madrid, Spain that chronicles the history of the city. It was opened as the Museo Municipal ("Municipal Museum") in 1929, and was renamed as the Museo de Historia de Madrid in 2007.

== History ==
The museum's building was formerly the Royal Hospice of San Fernando, built in 1673. It was designed by Spanish architect Pedro de Ribera.

The museum opened in 1929 as the Museo Municipal (municipal museum). The museum was closed in 1955 for building reforms, and was not reopened to the public until 1978.

In 2007 it was renamed as the Museo de Historia de Madrid.

== Collection ==
The museum's permanent collection demonstrates the history of Madrid from 1561 when Madrid became the capital of Spain to the beginning of the twentieth century.

The collection is divided into three sections:

- Madrid, Villa, Corte y capital de dos mundos (Madrid, town, court, and capital of two worlds): covers the 16th to 18th century and the first two centuries of Madrid as the Spanish capital
- Madrid, Centro ilustrado del poder (Madrid, enlightened center of power): covers all of the 18th century up until the War of Independence, including the Borbon dynasty and the changes in government
- Madrid, El sueño de una ciudad nueva (Madrid, the dream of a new city): covers the 19th century up until the First World War
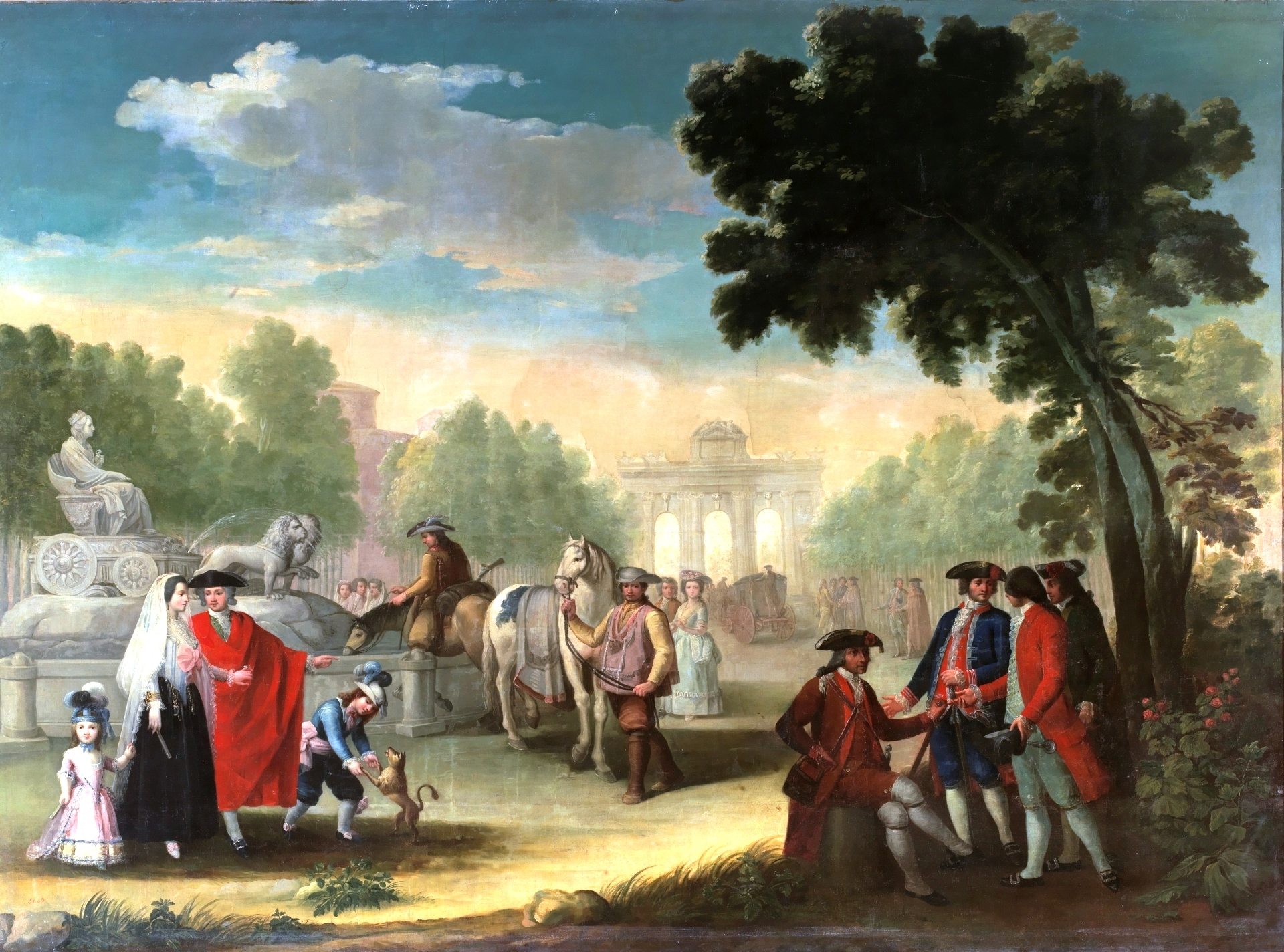
La Puerta de Alcalá vista desde La Cibeles (1785), by Ginés Andrés de Aguirre

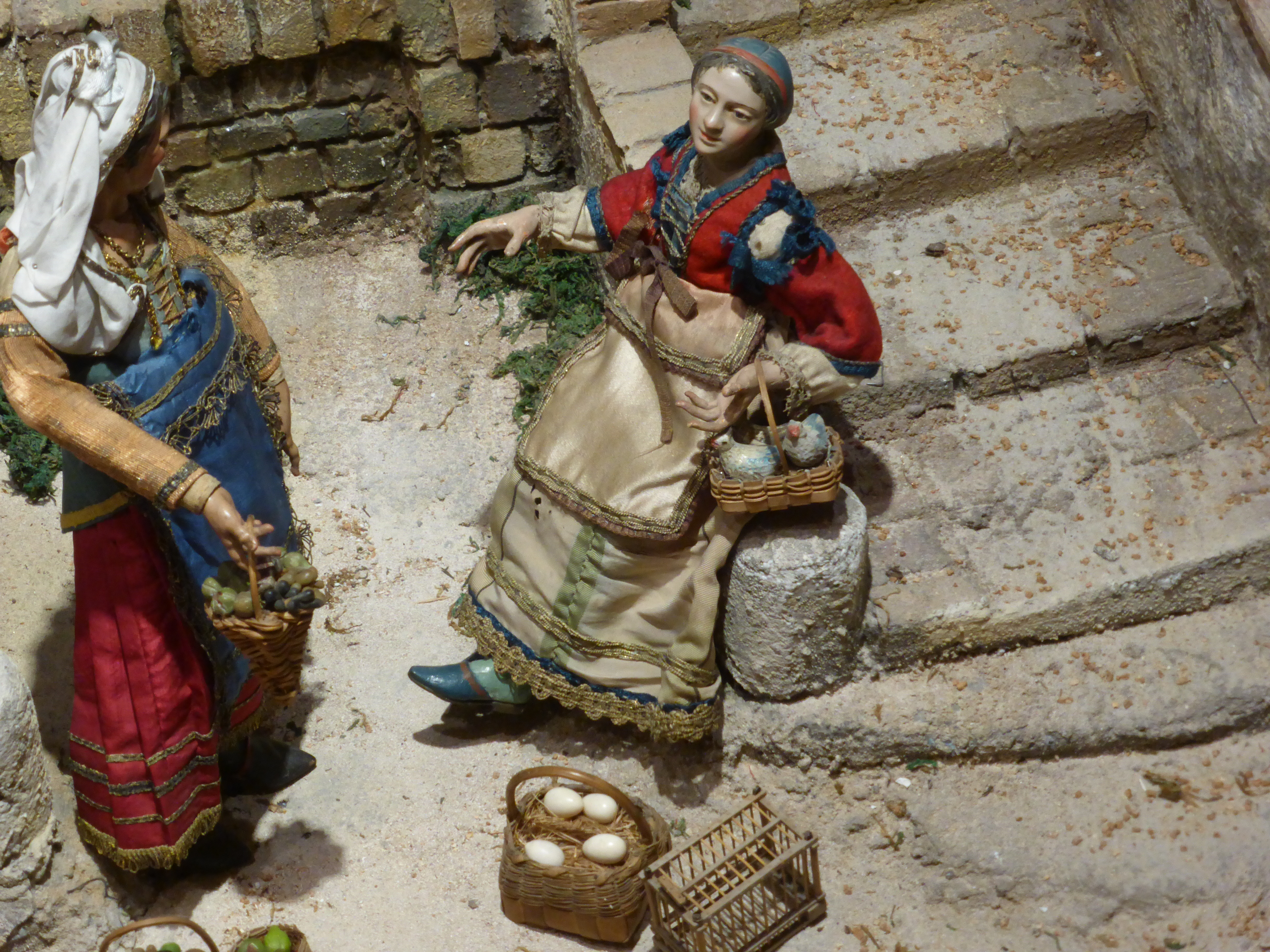
18th century Barroque sculptures

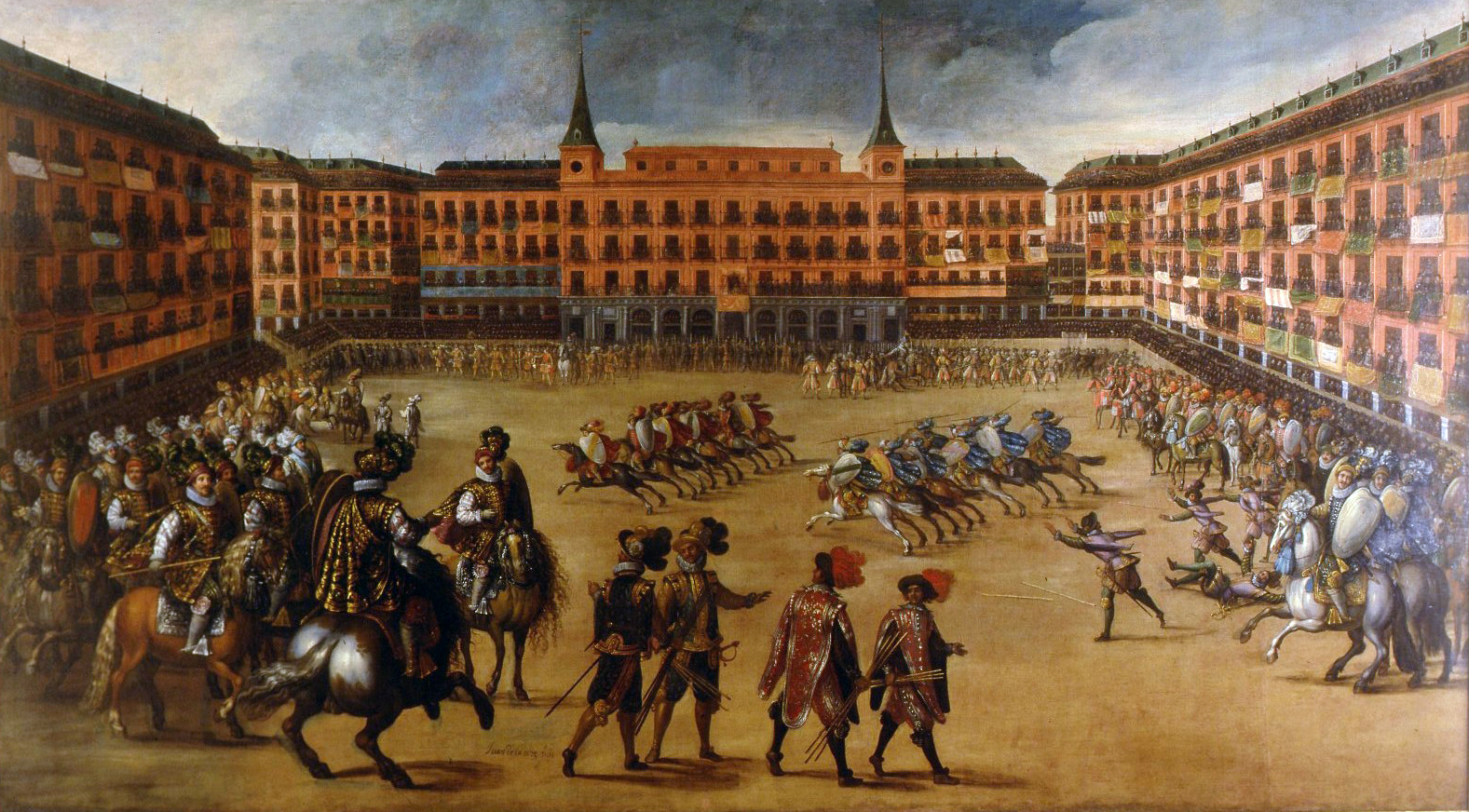
Fiestas en la Plaza Mayor de Madrid, by Juan de la Corte.

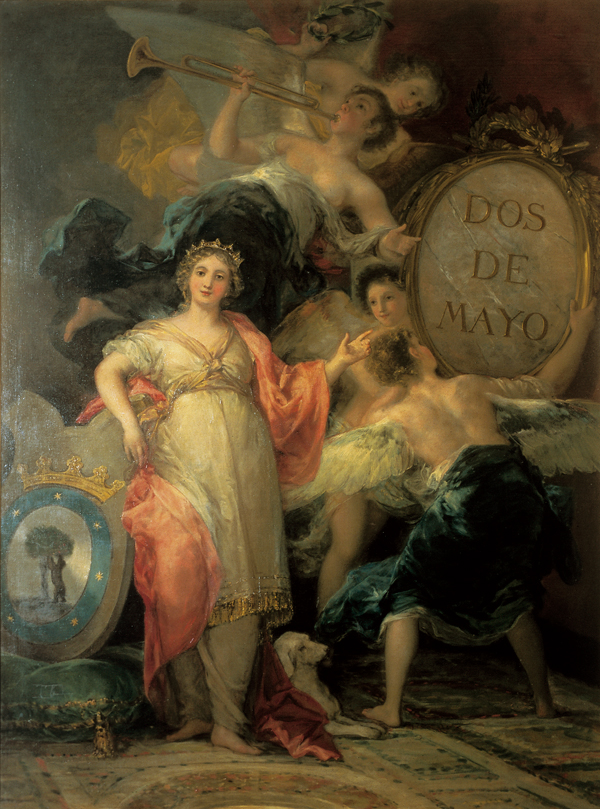
Allegory of the City of Madrid by Francisco de Goya, 1810

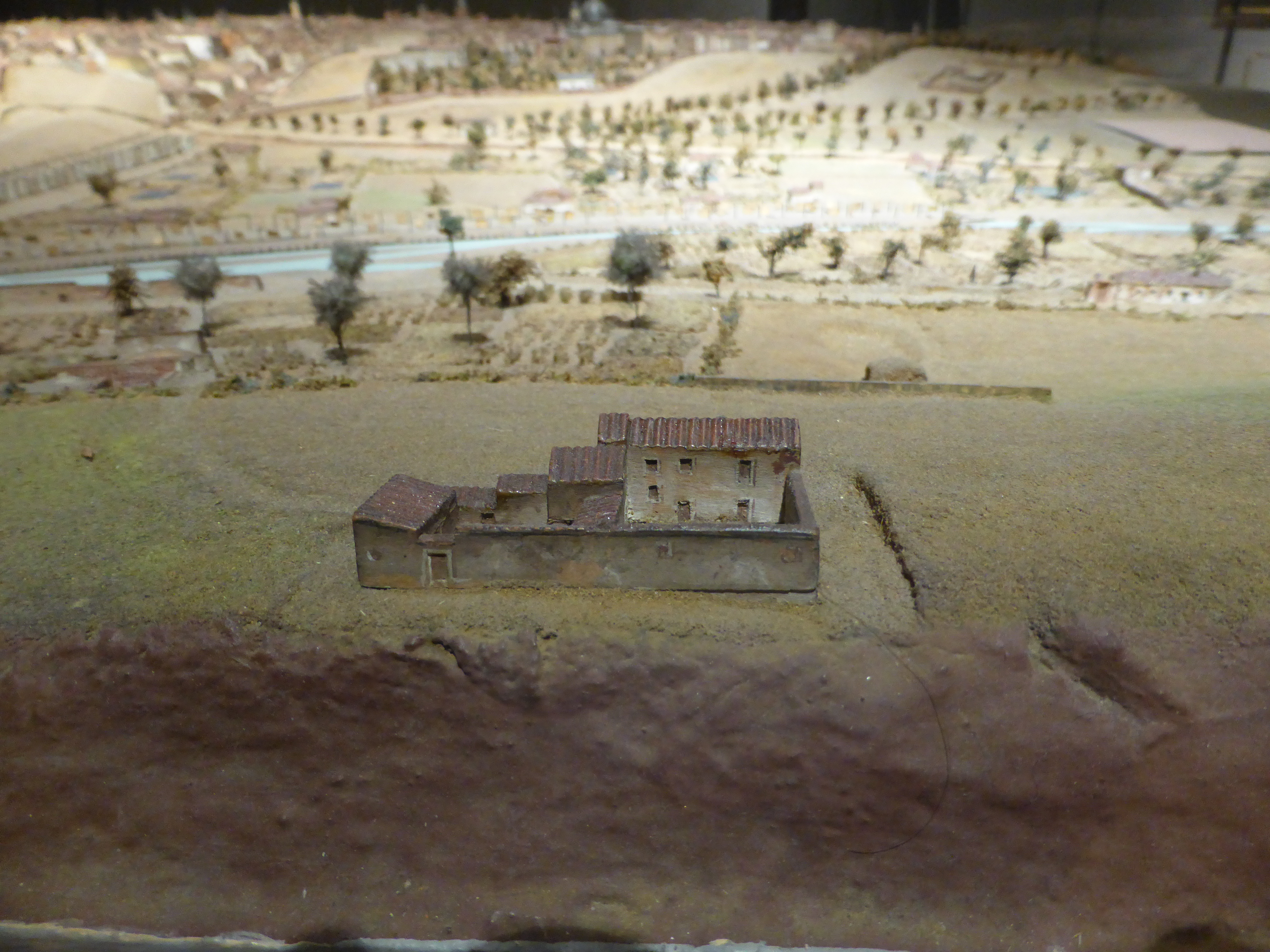
House where Francisco de Goya created his Black paintings
