= British Cemetery in Madrid =

Cemetery in Spain

British Cemetery
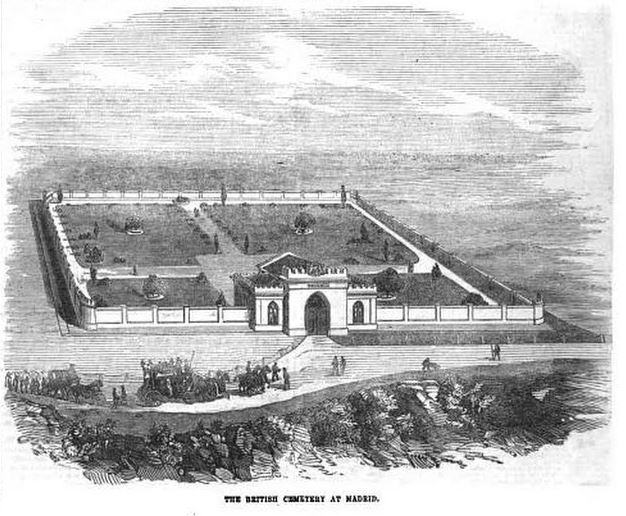
- British cemetery, Madrid, The Illustrated London News, 14 July 1855.
- Interactive map of British Cemetery

Details
- Established: 1854
- Location: Carabanchel, Madrid
- Country: Spain
- Coordinates: 40°23′42″N 03°43′21″W
- Type: non-Catholic Resident Foreigners (closed)
- Website: Official website
- Find a Grave: British Cemetery

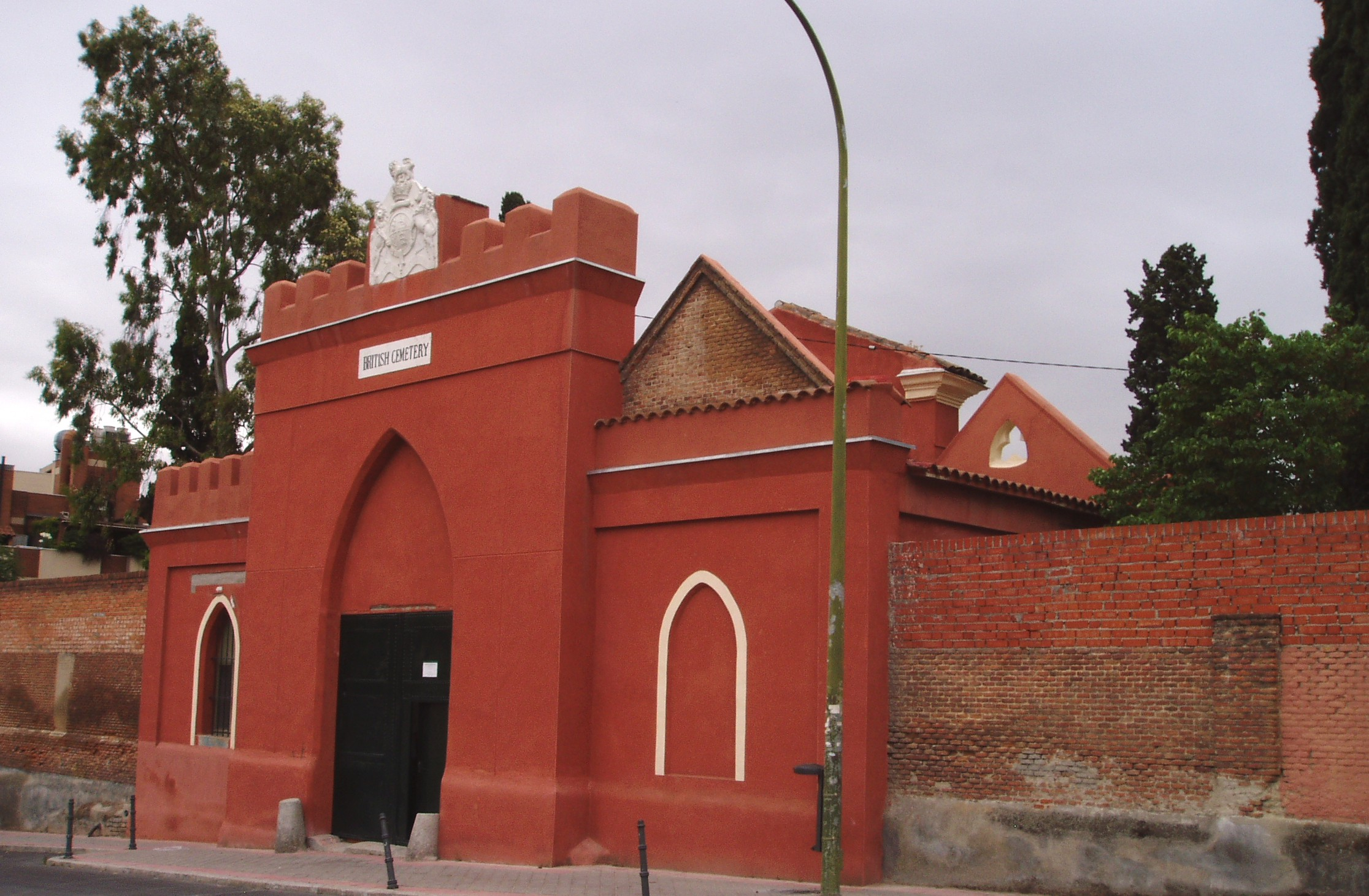
Entrance of Cementerio de los Ingleses

The British Cemetery in Madrid (Cementerio británico de Madrid or Cementerio de los Ingleses) was opened in 1854 in the Carabanchel district of Madrid, Spain, and the first burials took place that year. Few burials take place in the cemetery today because it is full, but there is provision for the interment of cremated remains.

The cemetery is similar to many other such British cemeteries which came into existence after the Reformation when governments and religious authorities excluded those not of their prescribed faith from burial in their consecrated ground.

In the century and a half of the cemetery's existence, Anglican, Protestant, Orthodox, and Jews, who died in Madrid have been buried there. In all, the remains of about 1000 people are interred in the cemetery. About half are the remains are of British nationals, 63 Germans, 49 Americans, 30 Spanish, 28 Swiss, 27 French, with the rest from a further 37 nations. There are Commonwealth war graves of three British Army personnel of World War I and a Royal Air Force officer of World War II.

Notable burials include Alice Bache Gould, Charles Clifford, Irakli Bagration of Mukhrani, Walter Shirlaw and Walter Starkie.
