= Fuencarral =

Neighborhood in Madrid, Spain

Coordinates: 40°30′N 3°41′W

Fuencarral [fweŋˈkaral] is a neighborhood located in the northern part of Madrid, Spain. It includes the municipal area of the ancient town of Fuencarral, which was annexed to the city of Madrid by a decree of November 10, 1950. Administratively, Fuencarral belongs to the municipal district of Valverde in the district of Fuencarral-El Pardo.

== Images Gallery ==
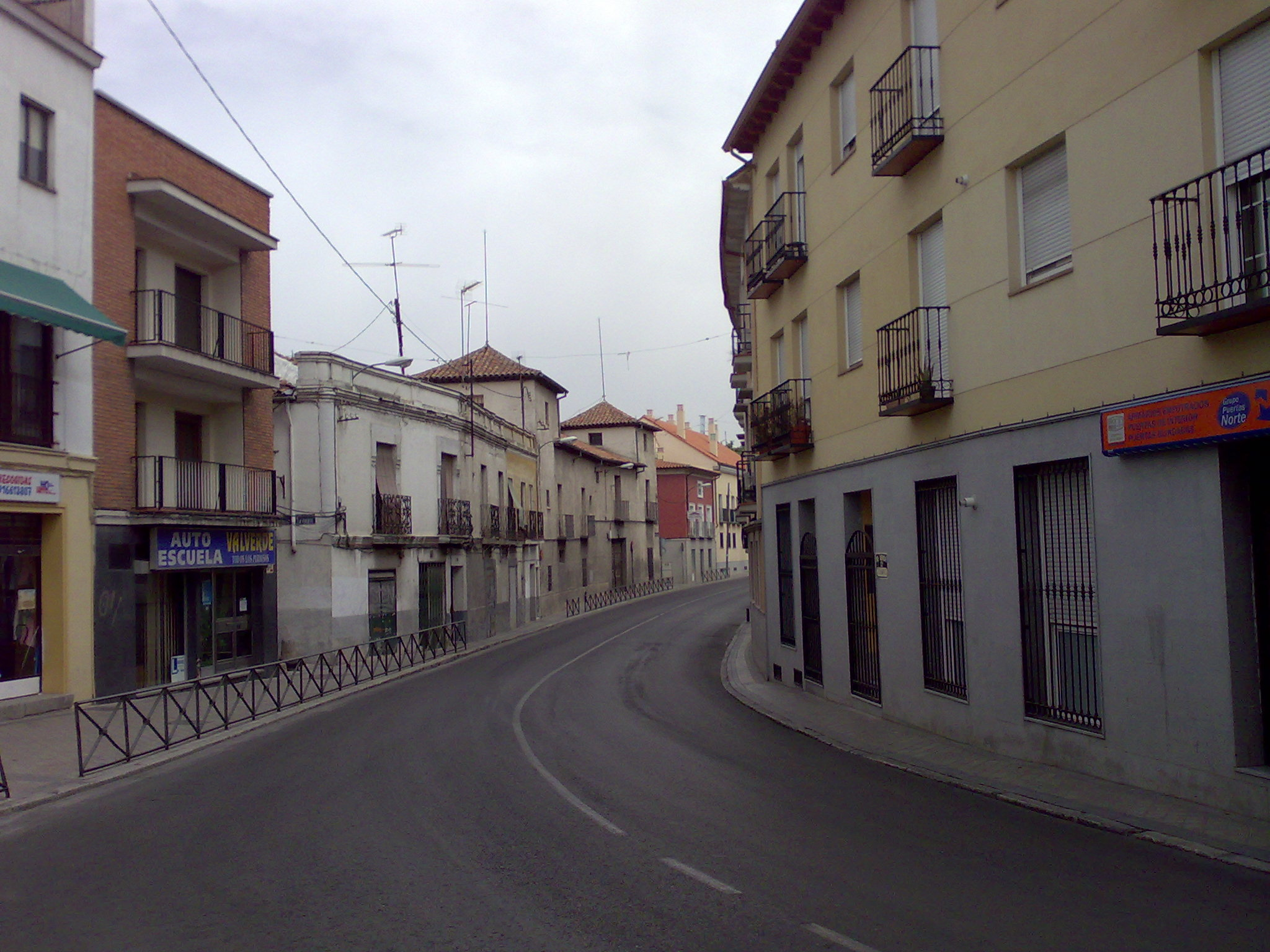
Nuestra Señora de Valverde Street

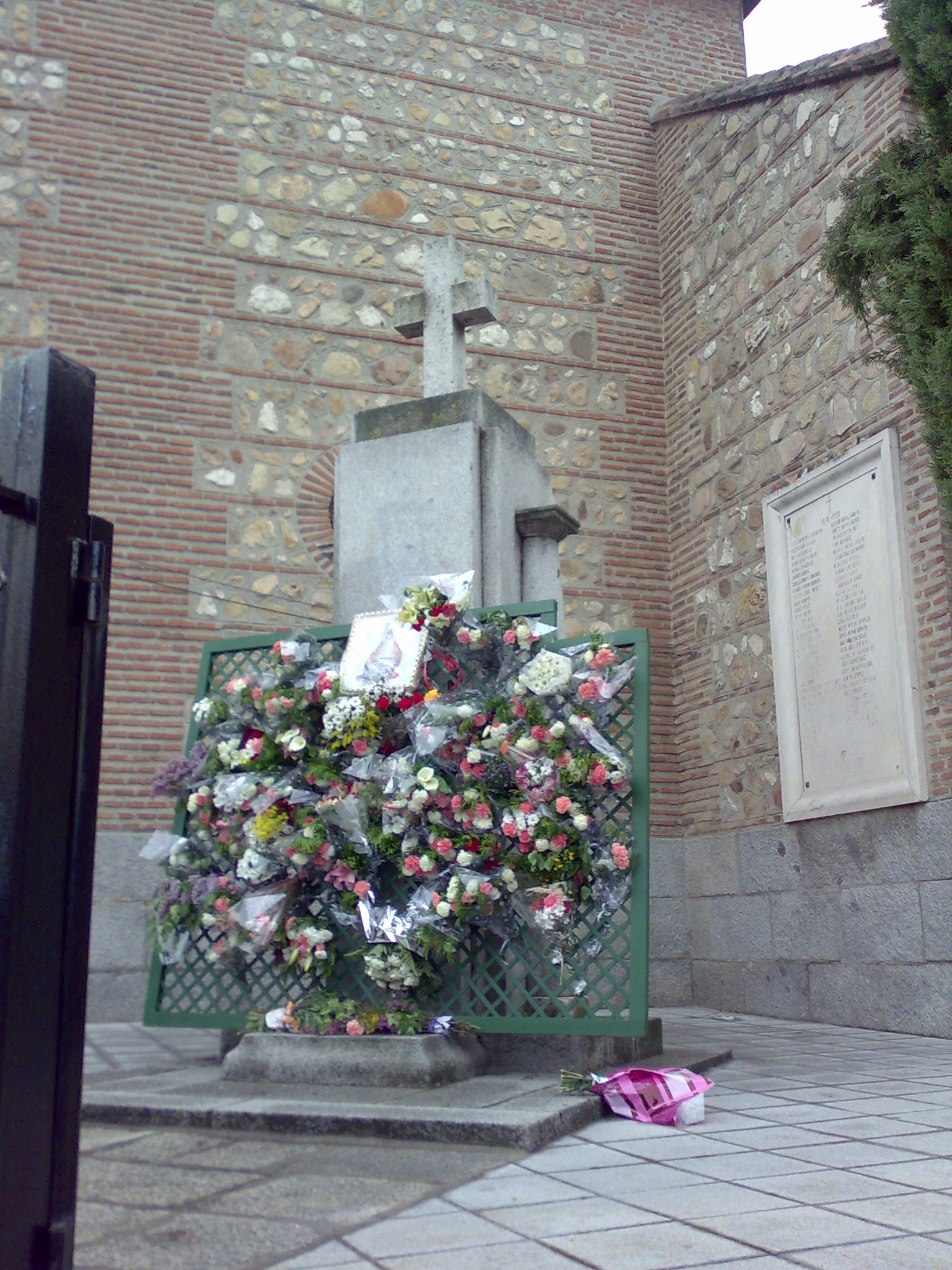
The cross of San Miguel's church

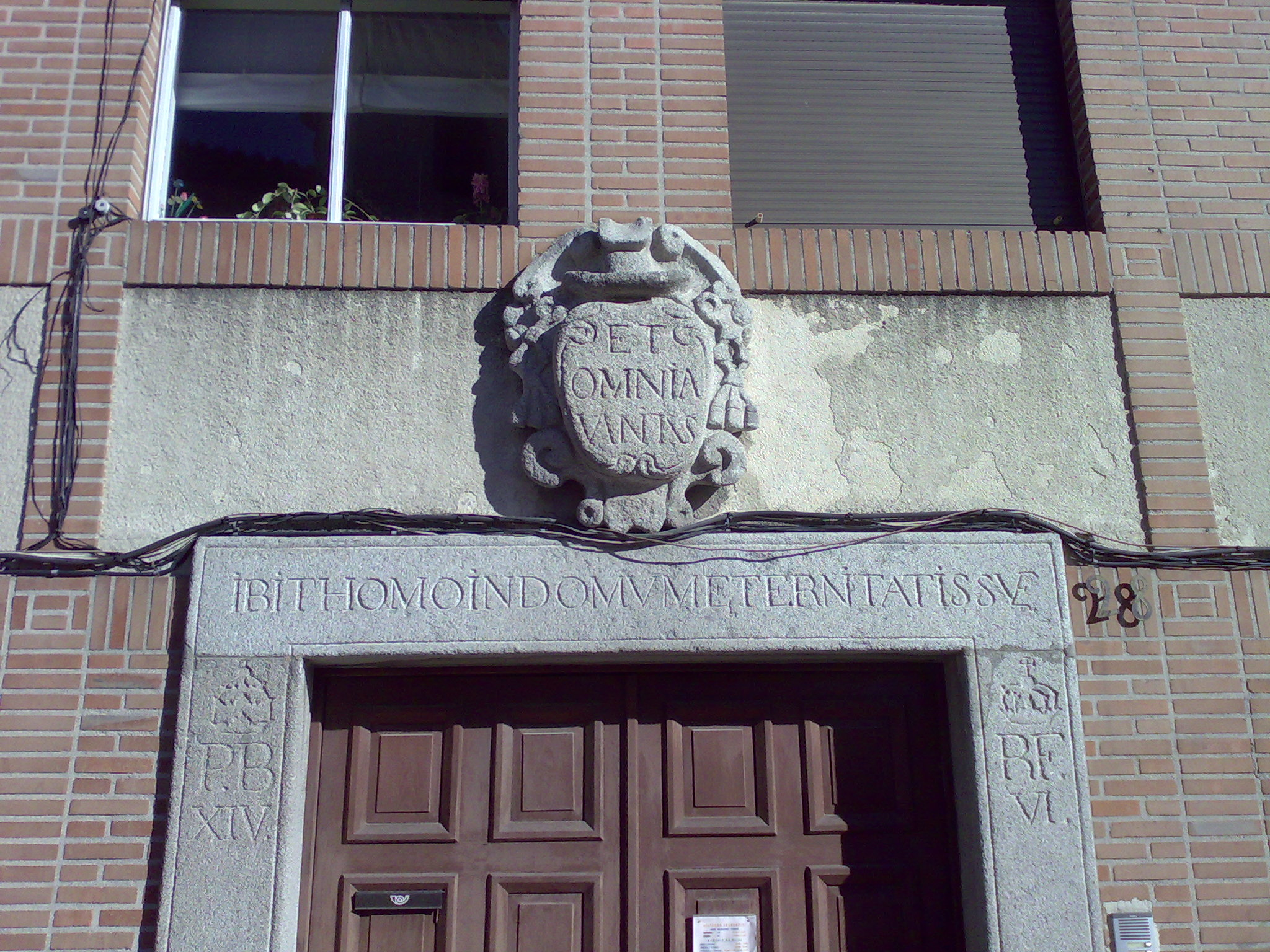
Details of the entrance to the Parish of Fuencarral

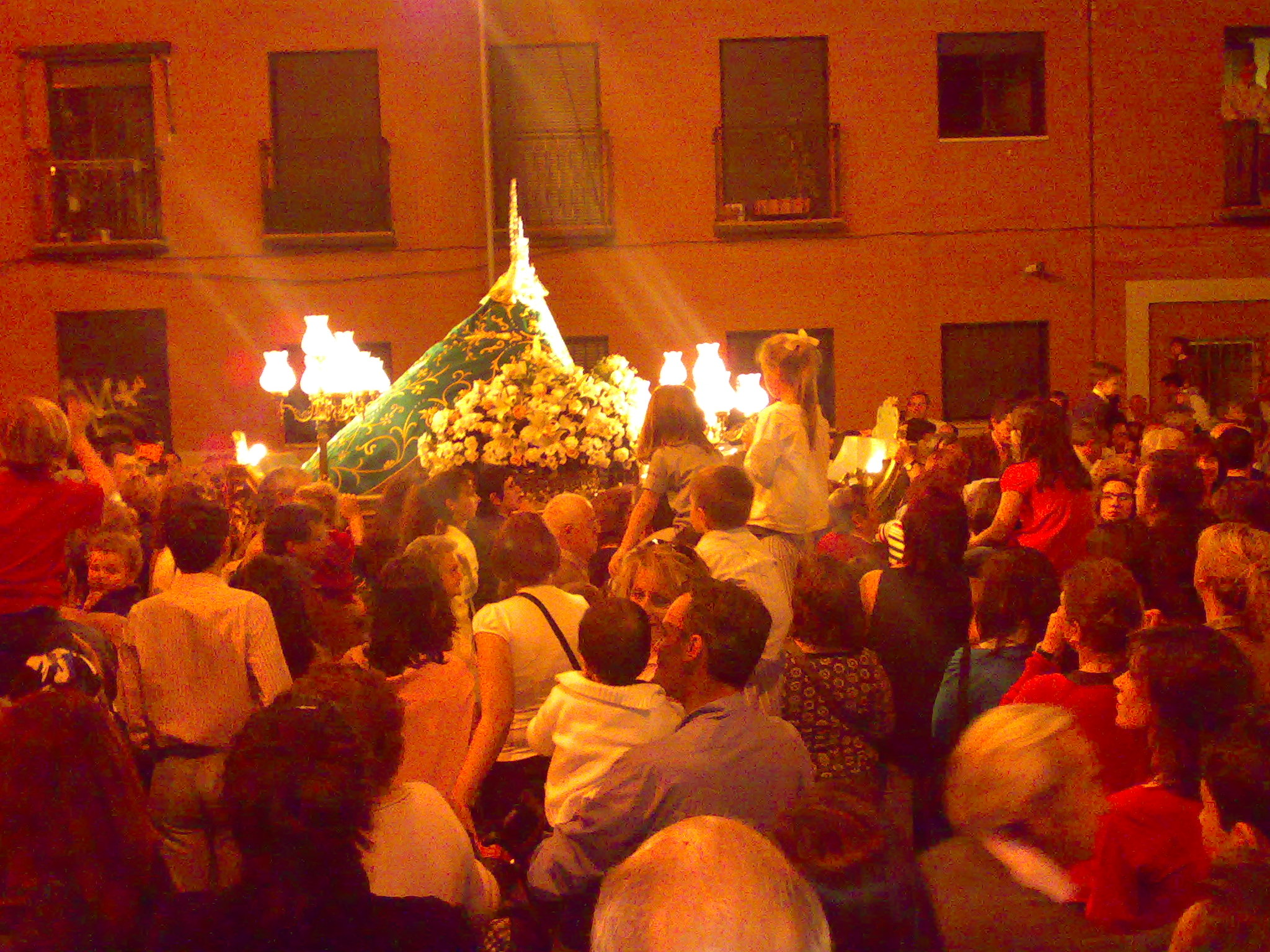
Welcome to Virgin of Valverde on April 25
