= Buenos Aires (disambiguation) =

Buenos Aires is the capital and most populous city of Argentina.

Buenos Aires may also refer to:

== Places ==
=== Argentina ===
- Buenos Aires Central Business District, the central business district of Buenos Aires
- Greater Buenos Aires, the city of Buenos Aires and its surrounding conurbation, with 12 million inhabitants
- Buenos Aires Province, one of Argentina's 23 constituent provinces, which does include most of Greater Buenos Aires but does not include the federal capital
- State of Buenos Aires, a historical period when the province of Buenos Aires acted as a nominally independent state from the Argentine Confederation
- Autódromo Oscar Alfredo Gálvez, a racing circuit near Buenos Aires, commonly known as "Buenos Aires" by motor racing fans
- Lake Buenos Aires

=== Bolivia ===
- Buenos Aires Lake (Bolivia)

=== Brazil ===
- Buenos Aires, Pernambuco, a city

=== Colombia ===
- Buenos Aires, Cauca, a town

=== Costa Rica ===
- Buenos Aires (canton), a canton in the Puntarenas province
- Buenos Aires (Costa Rica), a district in the Puntarenas province
- Buenos Aires District, Palmares, a district in the Alajuela province

=== Dominican Republic ===
- Buenos Aires, Dominican Republic, a sector in the city of Santo Domingo

=== Mexico ===
- Concepción de Buenos Aires, a municipality in the state of Jalisco
- San Nicolás Buenos Aires, a municipality in the state of Puebla

=== Nicaragua ===
- Buenos Aires, Rivas, a municipality

=== Panama ===
- Buenos Aires, Chame, a corregimiento in Panamá Oeste Province
- Buenos Aires, Ñürüm, a corregimiento in Ngäbe-Buglé Comarca

=== Peru ===
- Buenos Aires, Trujillo, a coastal town and resort
- Buenos Aires District, Picota, Peru
- Buenos Aires District, Morropón, Peru

=== United States ===
- Buenos Aires (Santurce), in Santurce, Puerto Rico
- Little Buenos Aires, a neighborhood in Miami Beach, United States
- Buenos Aires National Wildlife Refuge, in the U.S. state of Arizona
- Buenos Aires, Arizona

== Ships ==
- Buenos Aires-class destroyer
- SS Spanish transport Buenos Aires (1887), a Spanish merchant ship

== Other uses ==
- "Buenos Aires" (Iz*One song), 2019
- "Buenos Aires" (Tini song), from 2024 album Un Mechón de Pelo
- "Buenos Aires", a song by Tchami
- "Buenos Aires", a song in the musical Evita
- "Buenos Aires", a song by Nathy Peluso
- Buenos Aires in the Southern Highlands, a social tango event in Australia
- Buenos Aires Convention, a copyright treaty
- Buenos Aires (Madrid Metro), a station on Line 1 of the Madrid Metro
- Buenos Aires, a Medellín Metro station
- "Buenos Aires", a song by Macc Lads from Beer & Sex & Chips n Gravy (1985)

== See also ==
- Buenos Ayres, a town in Trinidad and Tobago
