= Vallecas Stadium =

Football stadium in Spain

Vallecas
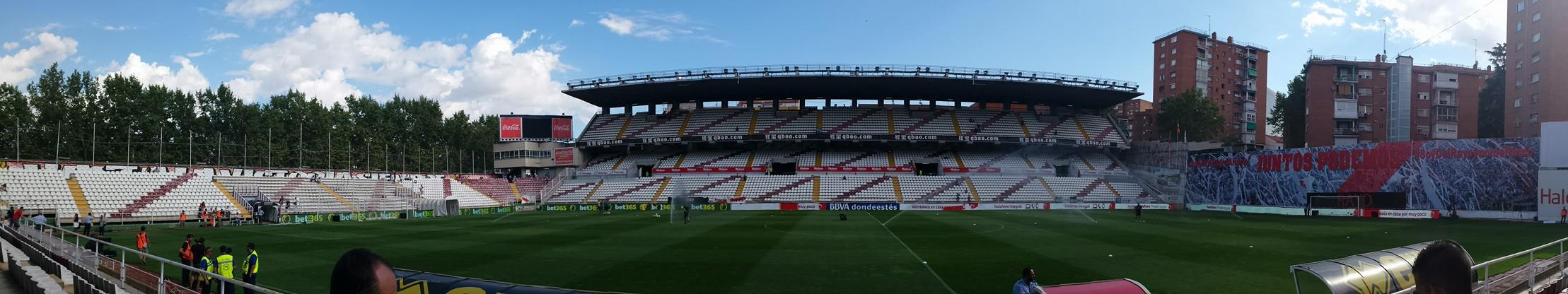
- Interactive map of Vallecas
- Full name: Campo de Fútbol de Vallecas
- Former names: Nuevo Estadio de Vallecas (1976–1994); Estadio Teresa Rivero (1994–2011)
- Location: Puente de Vallecas, Madrid, Spain
- Coordinates: 40°23′31″N 3°39′32″W
- Owner: Community of Madrid
- Operator: Community of Madrid
- Capacity: 14,708
- Surface: Grass
- Field size: 100 m × 65 m (328 ft × 213 ft)
- Public transit: at Portazgo

Construction
- Built: 1972–1976
- Opened: 10 May 1976

Tenants
- Rayo Vallecano (1976–2026); Spain national football team (selected matches)

Campo de Fútbol de Vallecas (originally Nuevo Estadio de Vallecas and previously Estadio Teresa Rivero) is a football stadium in the Madrid district of Puente de Vallecas, Spain. Up until 2026, it has hosted football matches as the home of Primera Division club Rayo Vallecano. The stadium holds 14,708 spectators and was opened on 10 May 1976. It was constructed between 1972 and 1976, and it is also known by the names of Campo de Fútbol de Vallecas and Estadio Puente de Vallecas (The Bridge of Vallecas Stadium).

== 2018 temporary closure ==
On 27 August 2018 the stadium was temporarily prohibited from hosting football matches, until improvements had been made, as parts of the stadium were judged to be unsafe by its owners, the Community of Madrid.

== 2026 lease suspension ==
On 28 July 2026, the Madrid regional administration revoked the lease of the venue to Rayo Vallecano after an audit uncovered serious deficiencies in safety, maintenance, and sanitation at the facilities. Rayo's first 2026–27 La Liga fixture at home on 20 August 2026 against Deportivo Alavés was played at Estadio Butarque, the home of Segunda División club CD Leganés. For the second home fixture against Racing de Santander, on 5 September 2026, the alternative venue is Estadio Coliseum, the home of Getafe CF, though the appeal against the suspension of Vallecas' license is still pending. Getafe appealed to this decision as well, claiming Estadio Coliseum will not be available due to construction works and their match against Celta de Vigo two days later. Estadio Butarque and Estadio El Plantío, home of Burgos CF, remain other alternatives if Vallecas or Coliseum are not available.

== Miscellaneous ==
Campo de Fútbol de Vallecas was the venue for the 1940 Copa del Generalísimo Final, as the Copa del Rey was known during the period of Francoist rule. It was the home stadium of Racing de Madrid, from the neighboring city of Chamberí, and its successor, Agrupación Recreativa Chamberí. Atlético Madrid also played their home matches at the venue between 1939 and 1943 after the Spanish Civil War, as their stadium, the Metropolitan, was destroyed by the war.

Rayo Vallecano stadiums over time:

Years	Campos / Stadiums
1924–1940	Campo de la Calle de las Erillas
1940–1954	Campo de El Rodival
1957–1972	Campo de Fútbol de Vallecas
1972–1976	Campo de Vallehermoso
1976–present	Campo de Fútbol de Vallecas

The chess federation of Madrid is based in the basements of the stadium. There is also a well known boxing gym called "El Rayo".

On 3 August 1986, the British rock band Queen performed at the stadium as part of The Magic Tour. It was the third from last concert of the band with the original members.

== Gallery ==
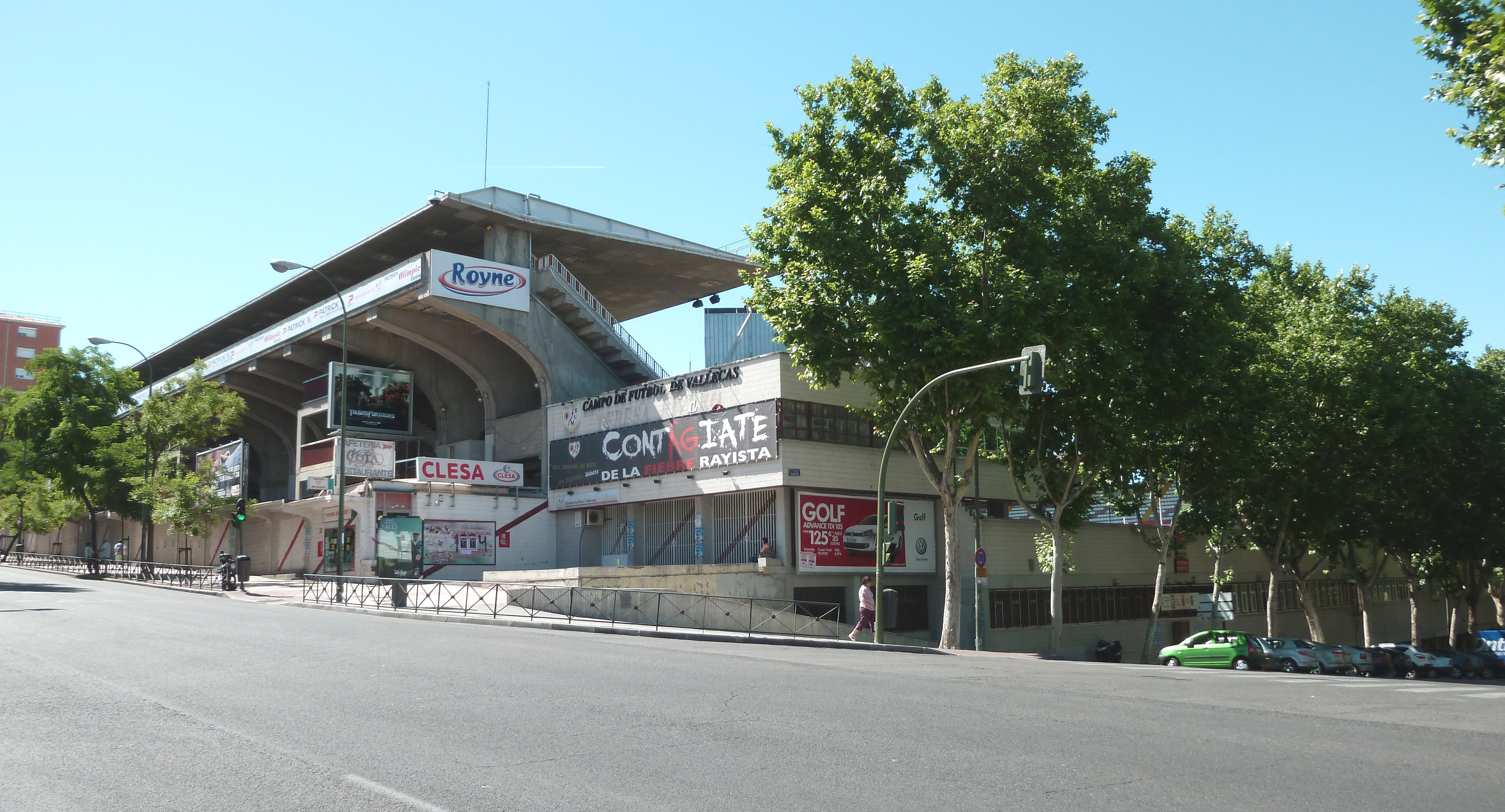
External view of Campo de fútbol de Vallecas

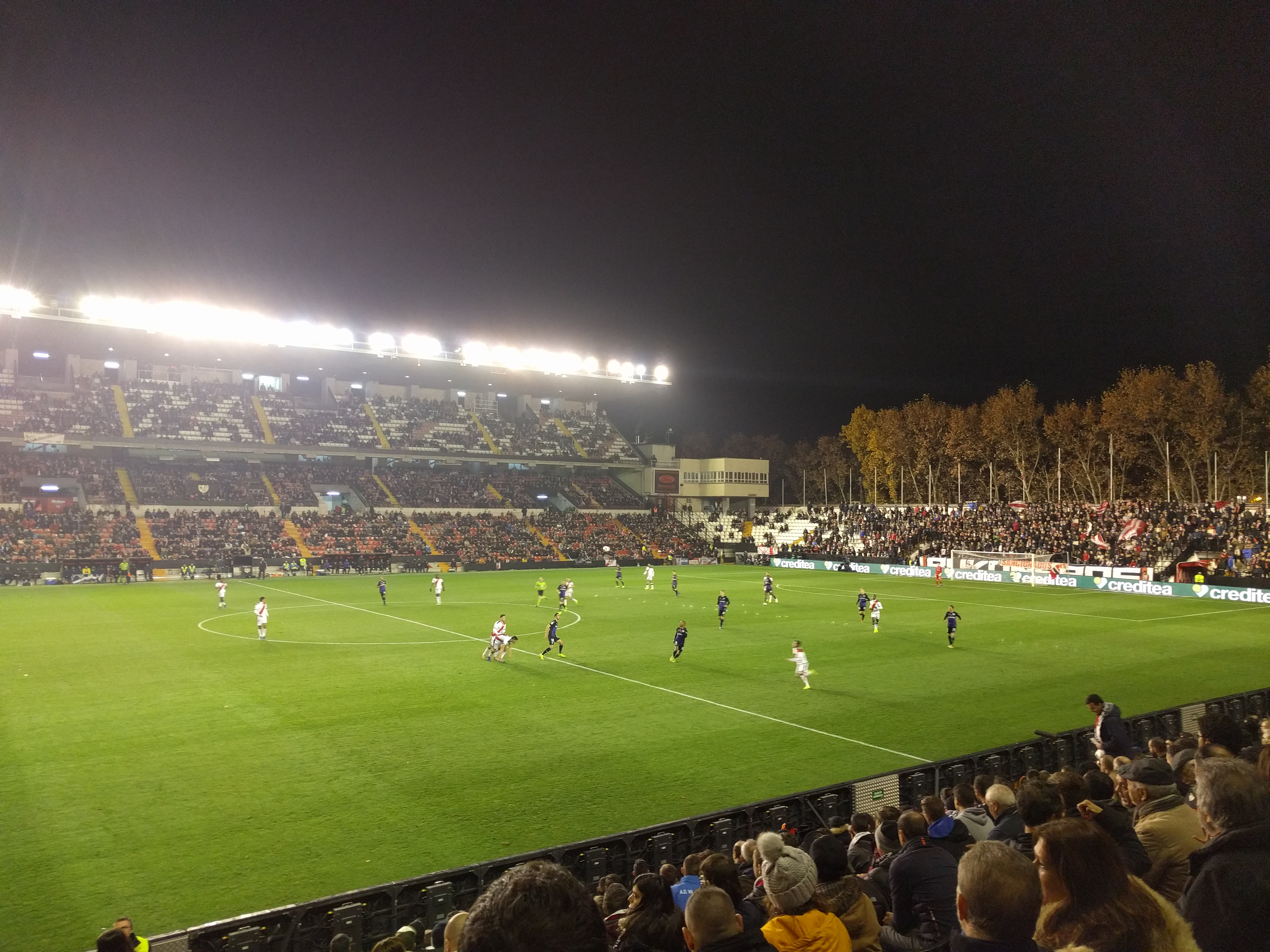
Copa del Rey 2018-19, Rayo Vallecano 0:1 CD Leganés, estadio de Vallecas

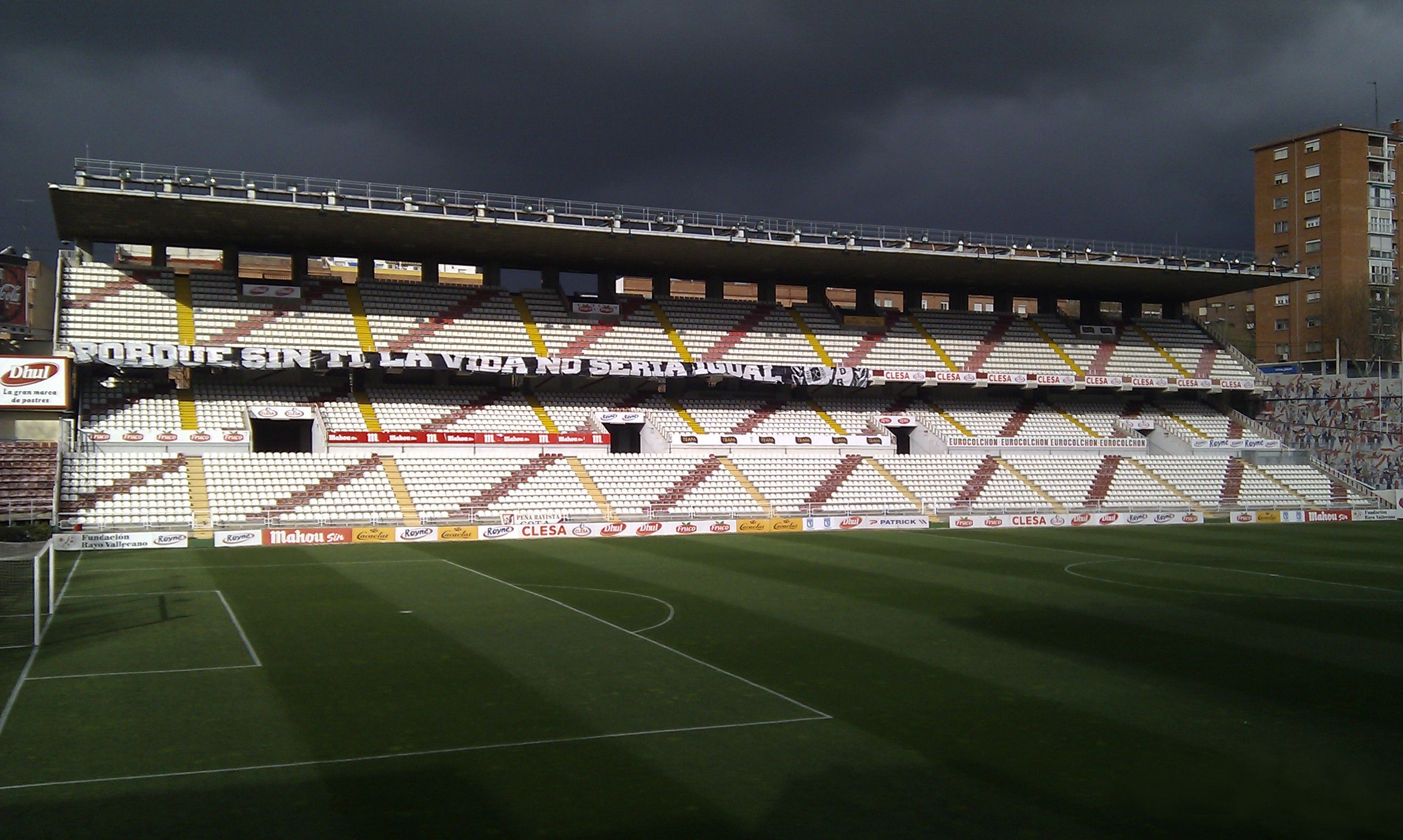
Estadio de Vallecas

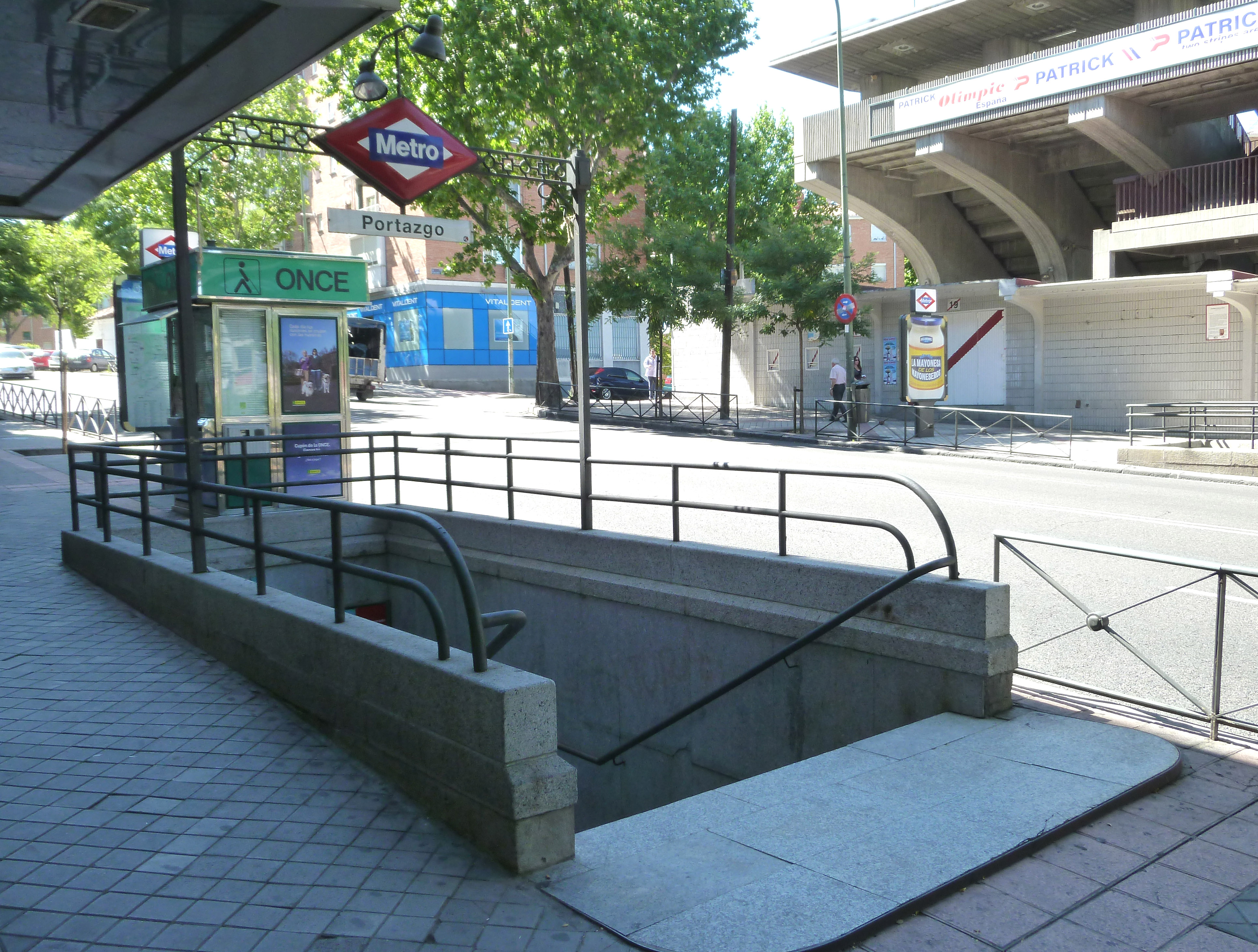
Metro de Madrid – Portazgo station next to the Stadium
