= Names of Buenos Aires =

The name of the city of Buenos Aires (Spanish pronunciation: [ˈbwenos ˈajɾes]), the capital of Argentina, means "Good Airs" (or less literally "Fair Winds") in Spanish. There are other places, mostly in the Americas, that go by the same name.

== Sardinian origin ==
When the Aragonese conquered Cagliari, Sardinia, from the Pisans in 1324, they established their headquarters on top of a hill that overlooked the city. The hill was known to them as Buen Ayre (or "Bonaria" in Sardinian language), as it was free of the foul smell prevalent in the old city (the Castle area), which is adjacent to swampland. "Foul smell" is another word for malaria ("mal aria" = bad air), since at that time people believed the air to cause the illness. Swamps are the breeding ground of Anopheles mosquitoes, the vectors of malaria which had been plaguing Sardinia since the Phoencian first arrived, until the swamps were drained and treated with DDT in the 20th century.

During the siege of Cagliari, the Aragonese built a sanctuary to the Virgin Mary on top of the hill. In 1335, King Alfonso the Gentle donated the church to the Mercedarians, who built an abbey that stands to this day.

In the years after that, a story circulated, claiming that a statue of the Virgin Mary was retrieved from the sea after it miraculously helped to calm a storm in the Mediterranean Sea. The statue was placed in the abbey. Spanish sailors, especially Andalusians, venerated this image and frequently invoked the "Fair Winds" to aid them in their navigation and prevent shipwrecks. A sanctuary to the Virgin of Buen Ayre would be later erected in Seville .

In 1536, Spanish seaman Pedro de Mendoza established a fort and port in current-day San Telmo (about one kilometre south of the current Buenos Aires city centre) and called it Santa María del Buen Aire ("Saint Mary of the Good Air"). The city name was chosen by the chaplain of Mendoza's expedition, a devotee of the Virgin of Buen Ayre. (Another version says that one Leonardo Gribeo, who had witnessed the original miracle, was on Mendoza's crew.) The naming of Buenos Aires after the Sardinian virgin also refers to it lying immediately beyond the southern limit of the South-American range of Anopheles species: therefore, Buenos Aires was one of the first malaria-free ports for ships coming from the north.

Mendoza's settlement soon came under attack by indigenous peoples, and was abandoned in 1541. A second (and permanent) settlement was established in 1580 by Juan de Garay, who sailed down the Paraná River from Asunción (now the capital of Paraguay). Garay preserved the name chosen by Mendoza, calling the city Ciudad de la Santísima Trinidad y Puerto de Nuestra Señora la Virgen María de los Buenos Aires ("City of the Most Holy Trinity and Port of Our Lady the Virgin Mary of the Good Airs"). The short form "Buenos Aires" became the common usage during the 17th century.

== Demonyms ==
The inhabitants of the city are called "porteños" ("people of the port") to acknowledge the centrality of the port of Buenos Aires in the development of the city and the nation.

Since Buenos Aires's federalisation in 1880, the city proper includes the former towns of Belgrano and Flores; the resulting city was separated from Buenos Aires province.

Residents of Buenos Aires province are called "bonaerenses".

Most of the population of Greater Buenos Aires lives in the suburbs, which are part of the province. Depending on context, they may be called bonaerenses or (more commonly) by the demonym of their town (e.g. quilmeño to refer to a person from Quilmes). Suburbanites may be sometimes referred to as "porteños" by those unfamiliar with the details.

== Formal and informal names ==
In the 1994 constitution, the city was given autonomy, hence its current formal name: Ciudad Autónoma de Buenos Aires (Autonomous City of Buenos Aires), sometimes abbreviated as CABA.

To differentiate the city from the province of the same name, it is common to refer to the city as Capital Federal ("Federal Capital"). This name was used extensively in road signs, for postal addresses, and in everyday speech (shortened to Capital or even la Capi), but usage of that name has been in decline since 1994.

- The abbreviations Bs. As. and Baires are sometimes used, the first one mostly in writing and the second one in everyday speech. The abbreviation BUE and BA gained currency since the 1990s.
- The city is sometimes called la Reina del Plata ("The Queen of the [River] Silver") in a nod to its being the largest city in the Río de la Plata estuary.
- Some songs have given alternative names to Buenos Aires, such as Soda Stéreo's la ciudad de la furia ("city of fury"). The oft-used expression mi Buenos Aires querido ("my beloved Buenos Aires") is the name of both a song popularized by tango singer Carlos Gardel and an eponymous movie.
- Because of its European influence, the city is sometimes referred to as "The Paris of America".
- Sometimes, the importance of Buenos Aires is perceived as casting a heavy shadow over the rest of the country and slowing back its development. This caused writer Ezequiel Martínez Estrada to refer to the city as la cabeza de Goliat ("Goliath's head").
- A popular expression says that "Dios está en todos lados, pero atiende en Buenos Aires" ("God is everywhere but he serves in Buenos Aires"), referring to the political centralism that the city represents.

== See also ==
- Buenos Aires (disambiguation)
