= Miguel Hernández (Madrid Metro) =

Madrid Metro station

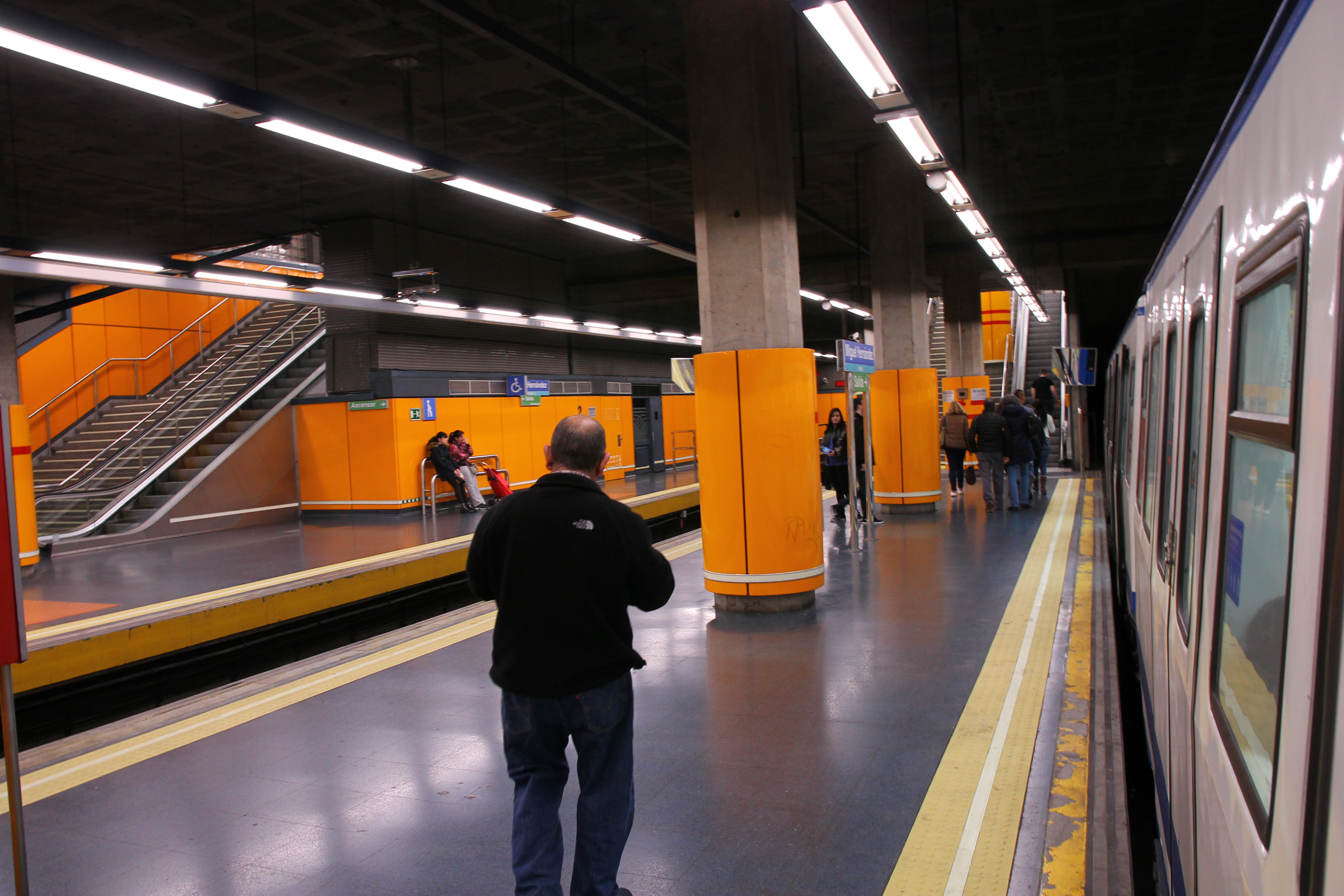

General information
- Location: Puente de Vallecas, Madrid; Spain
- Coordinates: 40.3873756°N 3.6397031°W
- System: Madrid Metro station
- Owner: CRTM
- Operator: CRTM

Construction
- Structure type: Underground
- Accessible: Yes

Other information
- Fare zone: A

History
- Opened: 7 April 1994; 32 years ago

Services
Preceding station	Madrid Metro	Following station
Alto del Arenal towards Pinar de Chamartín	Line 1	Sierra de Guadalupe towards Valdecarros
Location
- Location within Madrid

Miguel Hernández [miˈɣel eɾˈnandeθ] is a station on Line 1 of the Madrid Metro. It is located in fare Zone A. It was opened on 7 April 1994 and is named for the poet Miguel Hernández (1910–1942).
