= Puente de Vallecas (Madrid Metro) =

Madrid Metro station

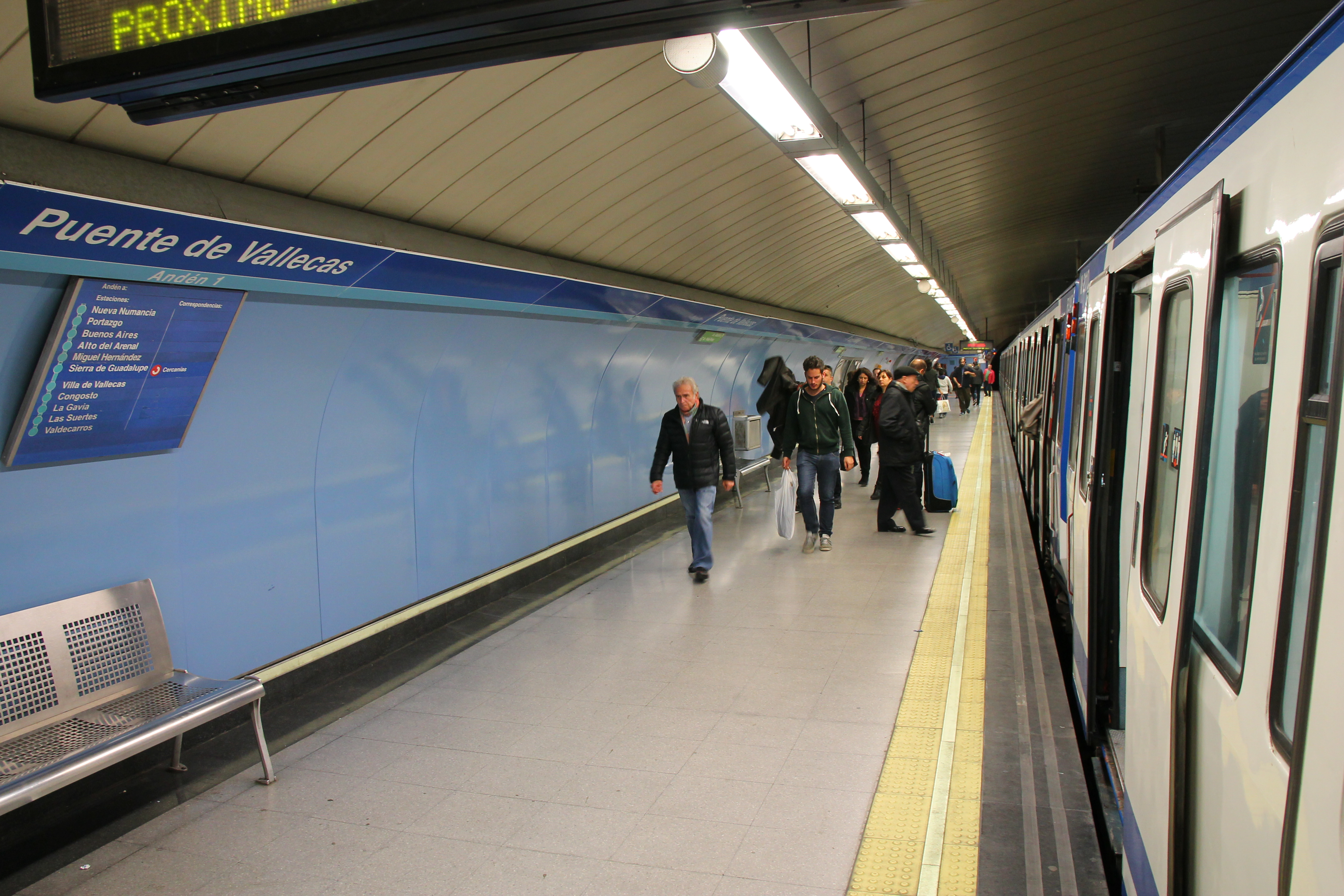
- Platform of the station

General information
- Location: Puente de Vallecas / Retiro, Madrid; Spain
- Coordinates: 40.3981962°N 3.6690554°W
- System: Madrid Metro station
- Owner: CRTM
- Operator: CRTM

Construction
- Structure type: Underground
- Accessible: No

Other information
- Fare zone: A

History
- Opened: 8 May 1923; 103 years ago

Services
Preceding station	Madrid Metro	Following station
Pacífico towards Pinar de Chamartín	Line 1	Nueva Numancia towards Valdecarros
Location
- Location within Madrid

Puente de Vallecas [ˈpwente ðe βaˈʝekas] is a station on Line 1 of the Madrid Metro, named for the Puente de Vallecas district. It is located in Zone A. It has been open to the public since 8 May 1923.
