= Marruecos =

Maruecos may refer to:

- a Spanish proper noun meaning 'Morocco'
- Marrakesh, a Moroccan city
  - Marocco (see), its former Roman Catholic diocese, now a Latin Catholic titular see
- Marruecos (Santurce), a sector of San Juan, the capital city of Puerto Rico
