= Alto del Arenal (Madrid Metro) =

Madrid Metro station

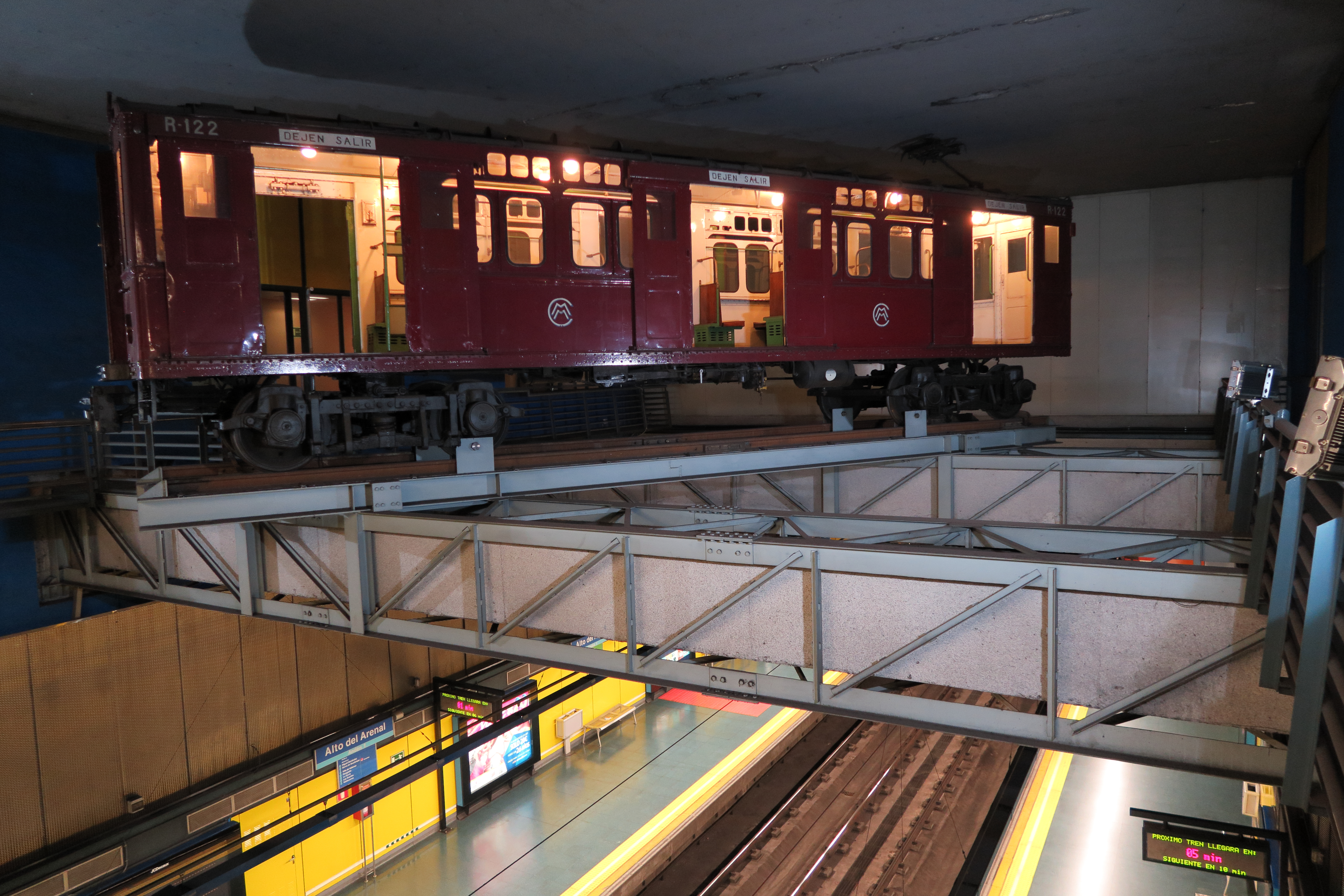

General information
- Location: Puente de Vallecas, Madrid; Spain
- Coordinates: 40.3897726°N 3.6452194°W
- System: Madrid Metro station
- Owner: CRTM
- Operator: CRTM

Construction
- Structure type: Underground
- Accessible: Yes

Other information
- Fare zone: A

History
- Opened: 7 April 1994; 32 years ago

Services
| Preceding station | Madrid Metro | Following station |
|---|---|---|
| Buenos Aires towards Pinar de Chamartín | Line 1 | Miguel Hernández towards Valdecarros |
Location
- Location within Madrid

Alto del Arenal [ˈalto ðel aɾeˈnal] is a station on Line 1 of the Madrid Metro. It is located in fare Zone A. It has been opened since 4 September 1994. it is named for the Colonia Alto Del Arenal ("Sandy Heights Colony"), a nearby development.
