= Nueva Numancia (Madrid Metro) =

Madrid Metro station

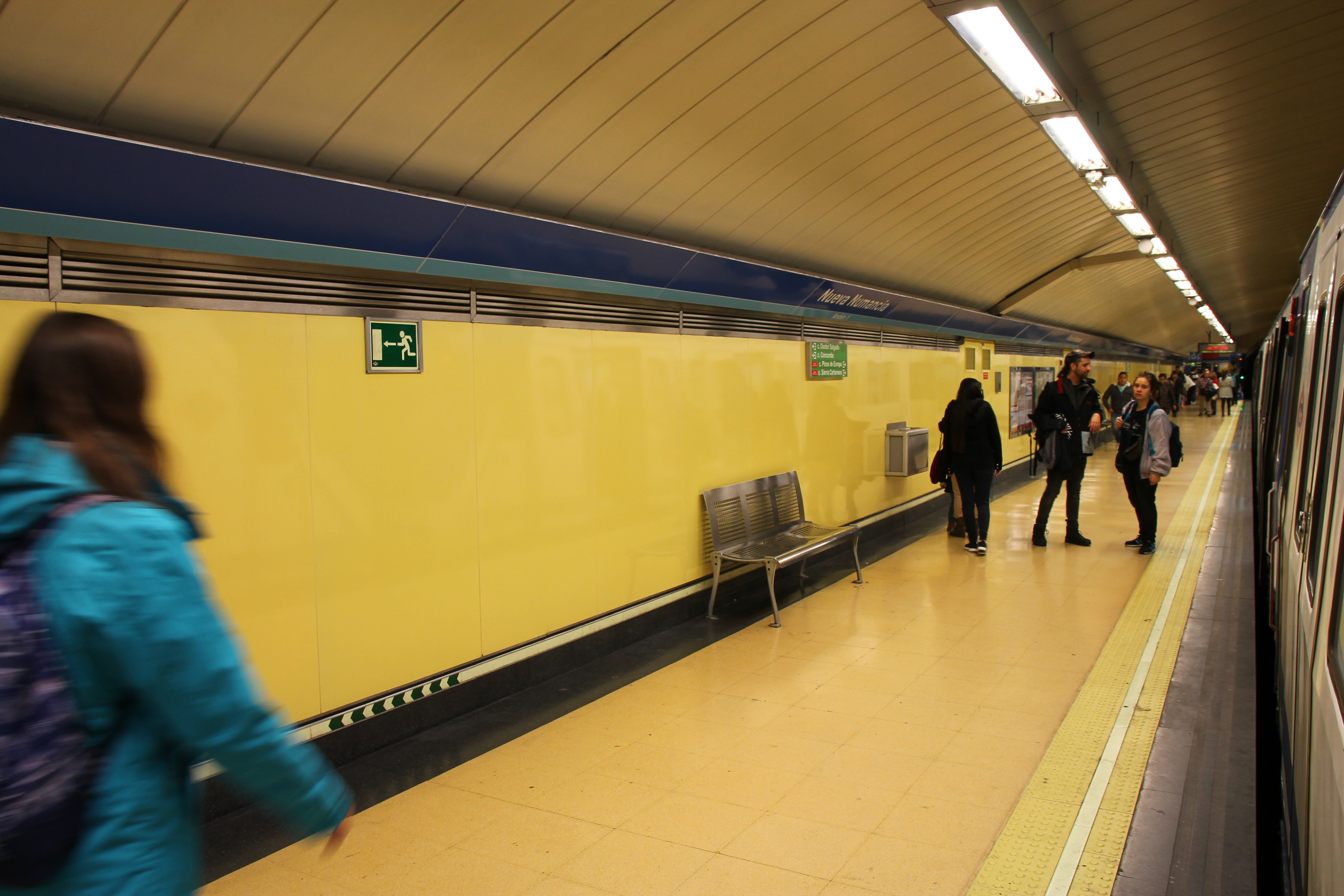
- Platform of the station

General information
- Location: Puente de Vallecas, Madrid; Spain
- Coordinates: 40.3955396°N 3.6641393°W
- System: Madrid Metro station
- Owner: CRTM
- Operator: CRTM

Construction
- Structure type: Underground
- Accessible: No

Other information
- Fare zone: A

History
- Opened: 2 July 1962; 64 years ago

Services
Preceding station	Madrid Metro	Following station
Puente de Vallecas towards Pinar de Chamartín	Line 1	Portazgo towards Valdecarros
Location
- Location within Madrid

Nueva Numancia ([ˈnweβa nuˈmanθja], "New Numancia") is a station on Line 1 of the Madrid Metro, in the Puente de Vallecas district of the Spanish capital. Accessible from numbers 47, 54, 69 and 76 of the Avenida de la Albufera, it was opened on 2 July 1962. It is located in fare Zone A.
