= Macc Lads =

English punk rock band

- Origin: Macclesfield, Cheshire, England
- Genres: Punk rock; hard rock; comedy rock
- Years active: 1981–1995; 1997; 2018–present
- Labels: Bestmusic Ltd; FM; Hectic House Records; Dojo Limited
- Members: Muttley McLad; Lurch; Pablo
- Past members: The Beater; Stez Styx; Chorley the Hord; Cheeky Monkey; Knobby; Phil McCavity; Al O'Peesha; Johnny Mard; Winston Dread; Bammy
- Website: Themacclads.co.uk

The Macc Lads are an English punk rock band from Macclesfield, Cheshire. Self-proclaimed the "rudest, crudest, lewdest, drunkest band in Christendom", the Macc Lads have typically used irreverent, foul-mouthed and politically incorrect lyrics; common themes have been binge drinking, sex and fighting.

== Concerts ==
The band were prevented from entering or ejected from venues in Macclesfield, London, Huddersfield, Bury, Cornwall, Blackpool, Colchester, Hull, Newcastle, Cleethorpes, Northampton, Leeds, Wigan, Lincoln, Bolton, Mansfield, Portsmouth, Cheltenham, and Norwich. They were also banned from entering the United States.

A concert at the Birmingham Hummingbird in 1989 resulted in thousands of pounds' worth of damage by fans. Vandalism included scaffolding being pulled apart and thrown onstage as well as a broken toilet, pots of paint and ashtrays. Band members McCavity and Muttley suffered cut heads and fans went on stage to fight the road crew and stage security members Lockstock and Mungo. At the end of March 1990 the band played at The Marquee Club in Tottenham Court Road, London, on the same day as the Poll Tax Riots were taking place in the streets outside. Many fans were caught in the cross-fire between fighting in the concert venue and the rioting on the streets.

The Lads' website states that at a gig in Cheltenham in 1991 a "bag of hot sick" was thrown at the band.

The band played their 500th gig at Nottingham Rock City on 4 December 1995.

== Break up, subsequent media appearances and reunion ==
Before reforming in 2018, the band last performed at a private show in 1997 for Muttley's local football team in Macclesfield. The line-up was the four-piece of Muttley, Winston Dread, Al O'Peesha and Johnny Mard. In 1999 Stez Styx, The Beater, Muttley and Al O'Peesha reunited for an interview at the Ivy House pub, Macclesfield for The Bear's Head fan website. This was conducted by long-term Macc Lads fan and Bear's Head fansite contributor Lance Manley, also known as Liquid Goblin.

On 23 June 2015 The Guardian published an article by Ian Gittins in which he put a satirical interpretation on the Macc Lads' lyrics and said that they had arrived "too early" in music history to not be taken at face value. The article stated that they were ultimately "a coarse yet clever spoof". Muttley McLad himself rejected this description, saying "There was no ulterior motive, The Guardian are reading too much into it. Making us out to be witty, intelligent satirists is probably the worst thing that's ever been said about us."

In November 2015 a five-minute documentary called Coffee, Sex & Johnny Bags by The Beater's son Joe Conning was made and published on 2 January 2016 on YouTube and social media. The video is another reunion of the original line-up with Muttley, The Beater and Stez Styx giving insights into lyrics the band wrote plus reflections on their success. Also contributing was long-term "affiliate" Bammy the Bamster who is mentioned in a couple of the band's songs.

On 25 February 2017, the Macc Lads members Muttley McLad, The Beater, Stez Styx and Chorley the Hord reunited for a gig as F.I.L.F. with Bammy the Bamster on vocals. Although not an official reunion of the Macc Lads, this was the first time in since 1988 that Muttley, Chorley and Beater have played in the same band and the first time that Chorley and Stez have shared a stage. F.I.L.F. are an ongoing project aiming to cover classic punk music, and began closing performances with Macc Lads material at Blackpool's Rebellion Festival. A gig at No.5 Bar in Macclesfield on 10 February 2018 sold out in three days.

On 1 July 2018 Lance Manley published a memoir of his time following the Macc Lads. Entitled Beer, Sweat & Blood: On Tour With The Macc Lads, the book covers the period 1988 to 1999 and the recent reunion.

On 3 August 2018, the Macc Lads reformed to play the Rebellion Festival in Blackpool. The line-up was the same as F.I.L.F. with Bammy on vocals. Two months later Muttley resumed lead vocals, and Bammy stepped aside to become the band's full-time manager. A tour entitled The Usual Subjects took place in November 2018 with all of the gigs sold out.

On 16 November 2019 Lance Manley published a follow-up book entitled From The Cradle To The Gravy: Fan Tales Of The Macc Lads which features short stories and tales from other fans and associates of the band over the years.

On 14 December 2019 the band released their first original material since 2006. A vinyl 7-inch single with the tracks "Mary, Queen of Pox" and "Middle Finger" was given away free to all fans attending the final gig of 2019, at the Engine Shed in Lincoln.

In 2020 the Macc Lads began selling their own range of COVID-19 face-masks, featuring a cartoon of a stubbly chin and a mouth holding a lit cigarette. They also released five new songs via their website: "Devil's Handcart", "Best Barbershop", "Black Latrine", "Sunniside Nursing Home" and "Curley Clare". There is a video for "Curly Clare" featuring Muttley and the Beater.

In December 2020 the Macc Lads published a Ladvent calendar on their website. This featured a one-minute track entitled "Let's Get Pissed Again", which was originally featured on the 1982 EP release, Minge Pies & Mistletoe. Its lyrics were changed to reflect the lockdown over COVID-19. This calendar has been repeated with different material every December since then.

In February 2022 the Macc Lads manager Bammy stated that the 2021 tour was possibly the last one with that line-up, but material will continue in other forms.

In December 2022 a new song was released on the Ladvent calendar entitled "More Kids". It is about a man lamenting that his children are politically correct, vegan and "woke" and surmising that he could always have more children to replace them. It was only available while the Ladvent calendar was active and can no longer be accessed.

In July 2023 a group called The Spontanes was formed with Muttley McLad on bass and Bammy the Bamster on vocals and rhythm guitar. Other members are Andy Lewis on lead guitar and Shaun Salmon on drums. The music genre has been penned by Muttley as 'Uneasy Listening'.

A tour of Canada entitled "Try To Drink Canada Dry" was announced in 2025, with the Lads due to play five gigs in the province of Ontario, but the whole tour was subsequently cancelled. It had been due to start on 12 November and end on 16 November 2025.

== Band members ==
=== Current members ===
- Muttley McLad, (real name Tristan O'Neill) - lead vocals, bass, song writing (1981–1995; 1997; 2018–present)
- Lurch (real name Andy Lewis)- lead guitar and backing vocals (July 2023-present)
- Pablo (real name Shaun Salmon) – drums and backing vocals (July 2023–present)

=== Former members ===
- Stez Styx (1st incarnation), later known as Johnny Mard (real name Steve Hatton) – guitars, backing vocals, drums (1981–1986, 1993–1995, 2018–2023)
- The Beater (real name Geoffrey Conning) – lead guitar, backing vocals (lead vocals on Boddies), (1981–1986, 1986–1989, 1990–1991, 2018–2023)
- Chorley the Hord (real name Charles Moore) – drums, backing vocals (1986–1989, 2018–2023)
- Bammy the Bamster - lead vocals (2018)
- Stez Styx (2nd incarnation, real name Howard Minns, also known as frequent support act Eddie Shit) – drums, backing vocals, lead vocals on "Newcy Brown" (1990–1991)
- Phil "Fast Fret" McCavity (real name Phillip Turner) – lead guitar, backing vocals (1989–1990)
- Al O'Peesha (real name Peter Bossley, a journalist with The Sentinel) – guitar, piano, backing vocals (1991, 1993–1995, died in 2005 in Stoke-on-Trent)
- Cheeky Monkey (real name Percy Perkins) – drums, backing vocals (1985–1986)
- Winston 'Knob End' Dread (real name Kevin Hooper) – drums, backing vocals (1993–1995)
- Uncle Knobby – guitar, backing vocals (1986)

=== Other members ===
- Bammy the Bamster – lead vocals, 2018
- Barrel – Roadie, lead vocals on "Feed Your Face", 1987
- Binbag – lead vocals on "Dans Round Us 'Andbags", and "Fluffy Pup", 1989
- Stella Strict – lead vocals on "Two Stroke Eddie", live singer of "Fluffy Pup" in 1990
- Young Man – lead vocals on "Failure With Girls", 1985

=== Timeline ===
This is an approximate timeline of the members of the Macc Lads.

== Discography ==
=== Albums ===
- Eh Up (1983) Hectic House
- Beer & Sex & Chips n Gravy (1985) Hectic House
- Bitter, Fit Crack (1987) Hectic House
- Live at Leeds (the who?) (1988) Dojo
- From Beer to Eternity (1989) Dojo – UK No. 72
- The Beer Necessities (1990) Dojo
- Alehouse Rock (1994) Dojo
- Wild Cider Wife (2025) Hectic House

=== EPs ===
- One Gallon Demo (1982)
- Minge Pies and Mistletoe (1983)
- Macc Lads 5 (fan club only) (1986)
- Filthy, Fat and Flatulent (1987)
- Sheepless Nights (1988)
- ...and Drinking Partners (1989)
- Bog N Roll Circus (1990)
- Turtles' Heads (1991)
- England (2006)

=== Compilations ===
- Dirty CD Chips n Gravy (1989)
- Twenty Golden Crates (1991)
- An Orifice and a Genital (Outtakes 1986–1991) (1993) Dojo
- God's Gift to Women (1998)
- The Lads From Macc (1999)
- Anthology (1999)

=== Videos ===
- Beer and Sex and Chips 'n' Gravy (1986)
- Made in Macc (1987)
- Four Bleats to the Baa (1988)
- Come to Brum (live in Birmingham) (1988)
- The Three Bears (1989)
- The Quality of Mersey (live in Liverpool) (1989)
- The Beer Necessities (1990)
- Sex, Pies and Videotape (live in Manchester) (1991). The video was produced by EMI. Muttley stated in an interview in 1999 that the final result was "nearly as rude as a school choir".
