= Buenos Aires (Santurce) =

Subbarrio of Santurce in San Juan, Puerto Rico

Coordinates: 18°26′16″N 66°04′01″W

- Subbarrio
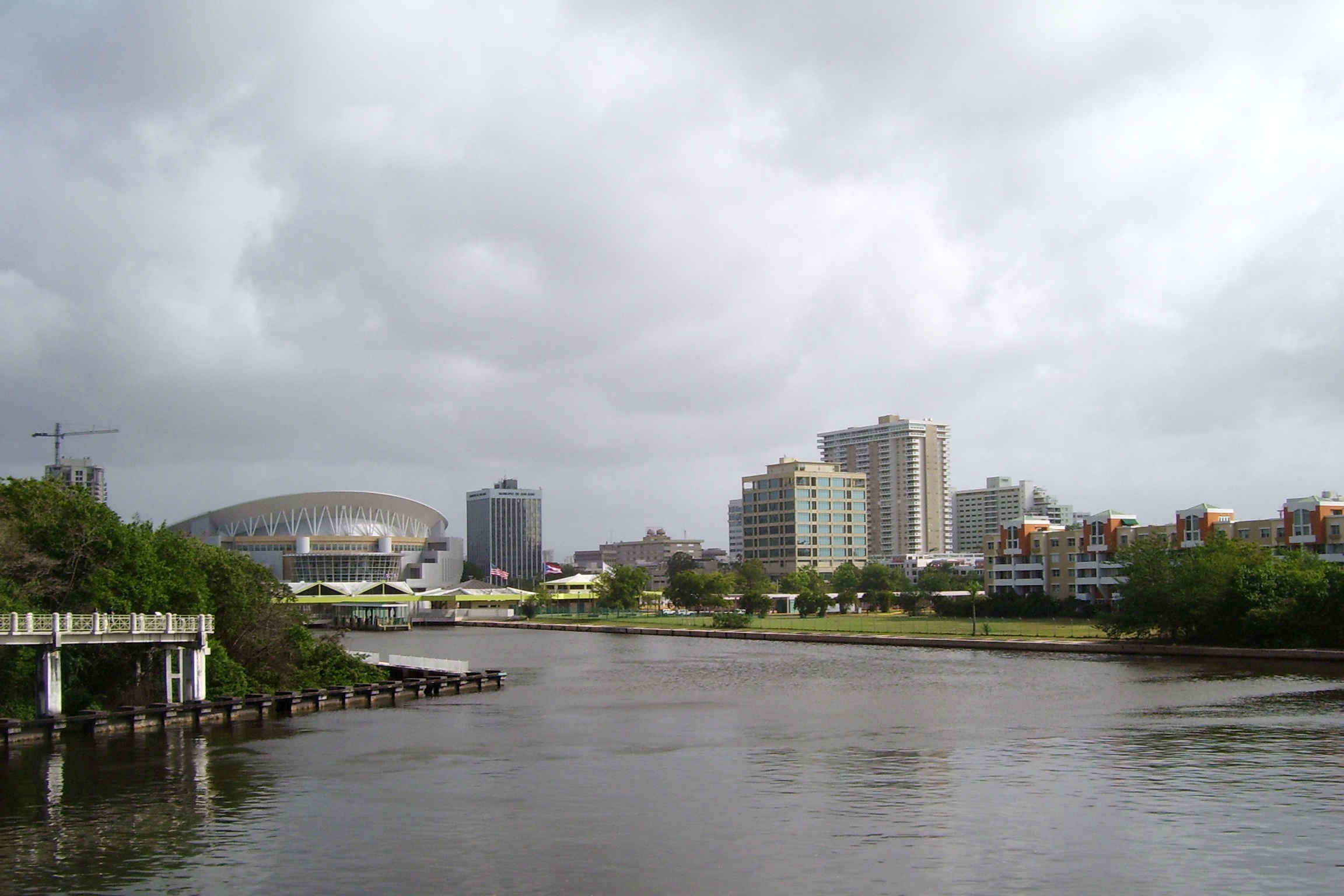
- Skyline of Hato Rey Norte from Buenos Aires

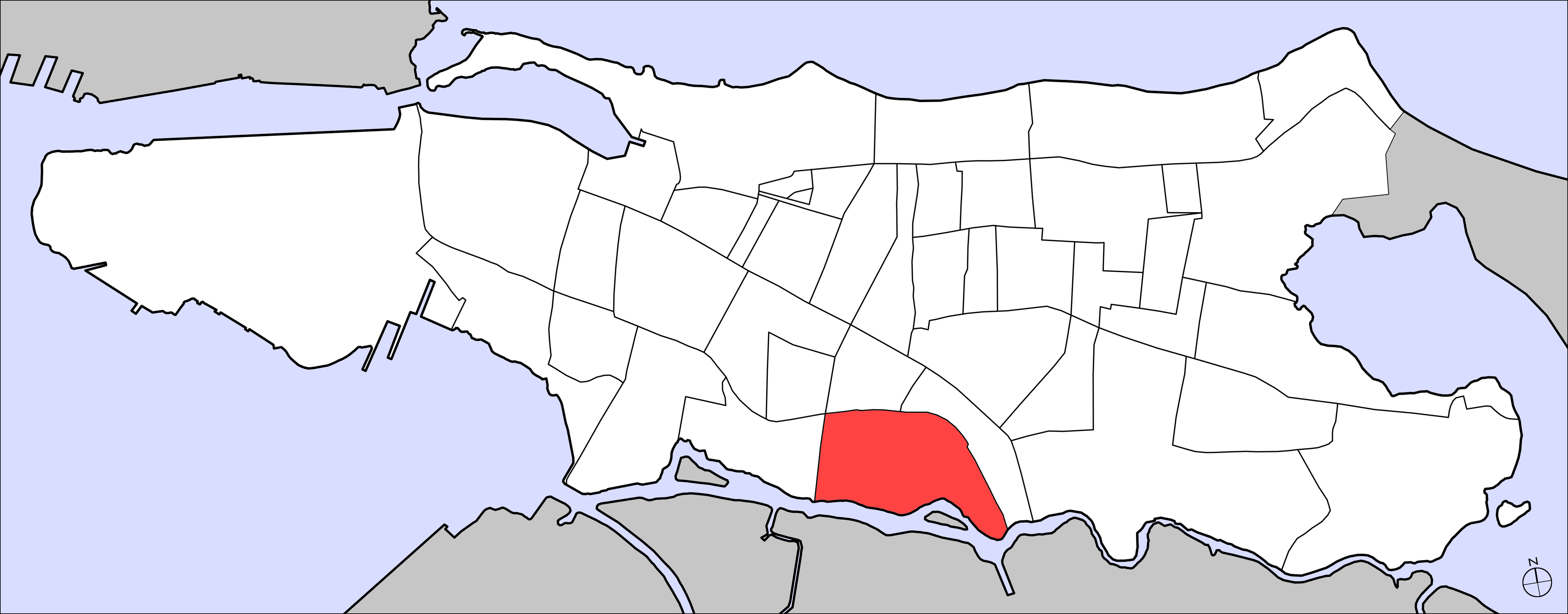
- Commonwealth: Puerto Rico
- Municipality: San Juan
- Barrio: Santurce

Area
  - Total: .19 sq mi (0.49 km^{2})
  - Land: .17 sq mi (0.44 km^{2})
  - Water: .02 sq mi (0.052 km^{2})
- Elevation: 0 ft (0 m)

Population (2010)
  - Total: 1,445
  - Density: 8,500/sq mi (3,300/km^{2})
- Source: 2010 Census
- Time zone: UTC−4 (AST)

Buenos Aires is one of the forty subbarrios of Santurce, San Juan, Puerto Rico.

== Demographics ==
In 1940, Buenos Aires had a population of 4,595.

In 2000, Buenos Aires had a population of 1,303.

In 2010, Buenos Aires had a population of 1,145 and a population density of 8,500 persons per square mile.

== Location ==
Buenos Aires is located on the south section of Santurce east of Marruecos and Interstate PR-22 (José de Diego Expressway) down below Interstate PR-1 (Luis Muñoz Rivera Expressway).

== Description and sites ==
There's only one street in the area, Los Angeles Street.

Buenos Aires acts as the home base for the headquarters of the Department of Recreation and Sports (Departamento de Recreación y Deportes) next to the San Juan Municipal Park. This park also serves the communities of other sectors in Santurce with three institutions located south of the Sagrado Corazón Train Station:

- The YMCA of San Juan (Basketball Center / Sport Center / Pool Center)
- Fondos Unidos de Puerto Rico (United Way of Puerto Rico)
- Centro Encuestre de Puerto Rico (Equestrian Center of Puerto Rico)

== See also ==
- List of communities in Puerto Rico
