= Buenos Aires (Madrid Metro) =

Madrid Metro station

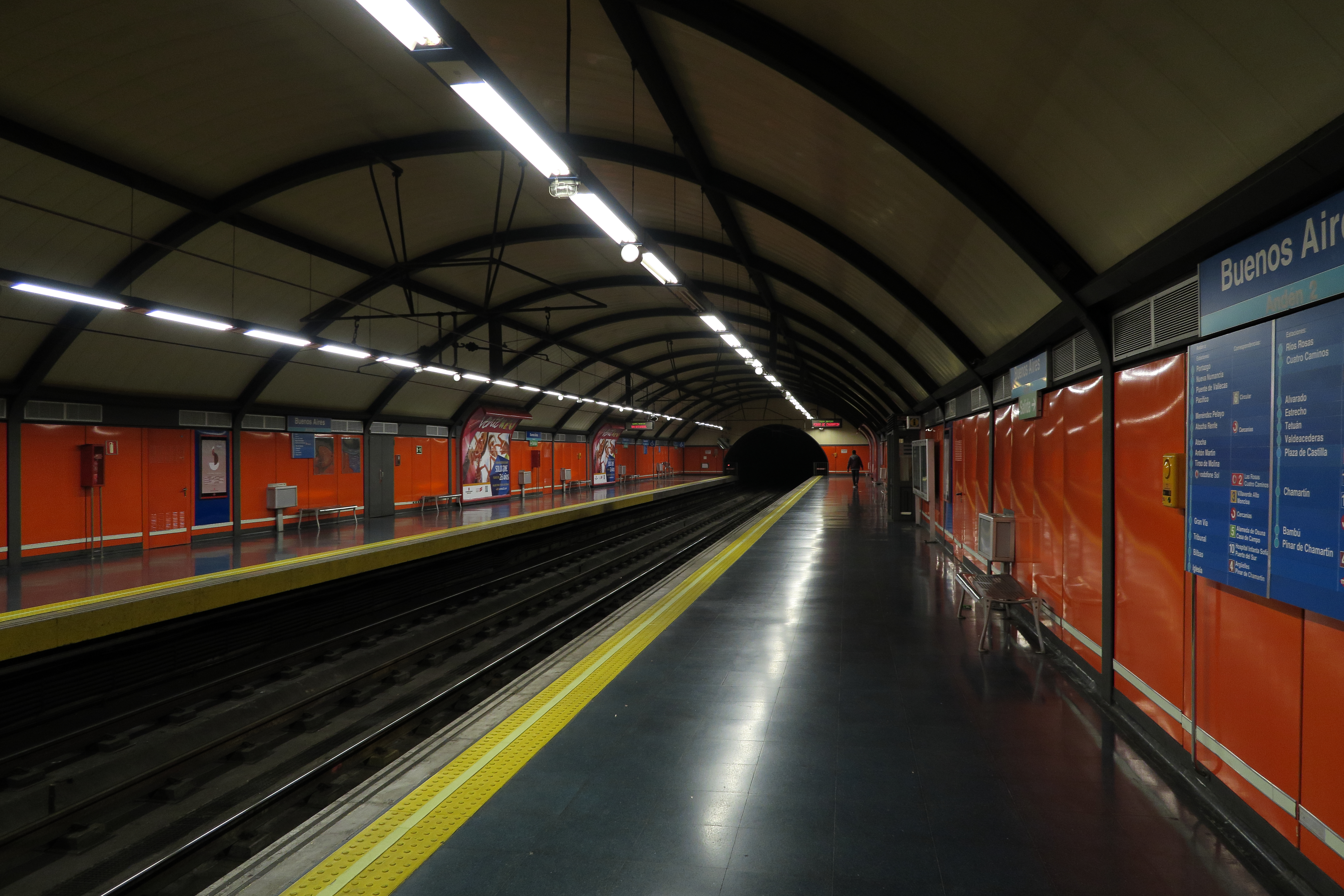

General information
- Location: Puente de Vallecas, Madrid; Spain
- Coordinates: 40.3915617°N 3.6539084°W
- System: Madrid Metro station
- Owner: CRTM
- Operator: CRTM

Construction
- Structure type: Underground
- Accessible: No

Other information
- Station code: 26
- Fare zone: A

History
- Opened: 7 April 1994; 32 years ago

Services
Preceding station	Madrid Metro	Following station
Portazgo towards Pinar de Chamartín	Line 1	Alto del Arenal towards Valdecarros
Location
- Location within Madrid

Buenos Aires [ˌbwenos ˈajɾes] is a station on Line 1 of the Madrid Metro, named for the Avenida de Buenos Aires. It is located in fare Zone A.
