= Portazgo (Madrid Metro) =

Madrid Metro station

- Platform of the station

General information
- Location: Portazgo, Puente de Vallecas, Madrid; Spain
- Coordinates: 40.3926609°N 3.6586792°W
- System: Madrid Metro station
- Owner: CRTM
- Operator: CRTM

Construction
- Structure type: Underground
- Accessible: Yes

Other information
- Fare zone: A

History
- Opened: 2 July 1962; 64 years ago

Services
Preceding station	Madrid Metro	Following station
Nueva Numancia towards Pinar de Chamartín	Line 1	Buenos Aires towards Valdecarros
Location
- Location within Madrid

Portazgo [poɾˈtaθɣo] is a station on Line 1 of the Madrid Metro. It is located in fare Zone A, and has been open to the public since 7 March 1962.
