= Bitter, Fit Crack =

Studio album by The Macc Lads
- Released: 1987
- Recorded: 18 March 1987; The Cottage, Macclesfield, England
- Genre: Punk rock
- Length: 29:19
- Label: Hectic House; FM Records
- Producer: Bald Eagle

The Macc Lads chronology
Beer & Sex & Chips n Gravy (1985)	Bitter, Fit Crack (1987)	Live at Leeds (the who?) (1988)

Professional ratings
Review scores
Source	Rating
Allmusic	3.5/5 stars
Kerrang!	3.75/5 stars
Underground	(0/3)

Bitter, Fit Crack is the third full-length album from irreverent English punk rock band, The Macc Lads. It was released in 1987 and follows Beer & Sex & Chips n Gravy from 1985. Dave Thompson, writing for Allmusic gave the album 3.5 stars out of 5, while Johnny Eager of Underground magazine gave it a zero-rating, asking "does anybody buy this shoddy dross?".

== Track listing ==
- All songs written by Conning, O'Neill, and Moore, unless otherwise stated
1. "Barrel's Round" – 1:53
2. "Guess Me Weight" – 2:46
3. "Uncle Knobby" (Conning, O'Neill, Hatton) – 3:09
4. "Maid of Ale" - 2:41
5. "Dan's Big Log" - 2:26
6. "Got to be Gordon's" - 2:02
7. "Bitter, Fit Crack" – 2:12
8. "Julie the Schooly" – 2:35
9. "Doctor, Doctor" – 1:41
10. "Torremolinos" – 2:37
11. "Al O'Peesha" – 2:34
12. "Feed Your Face" – 3:00

1993 CD issue bonus track

1. "Jingle Bells"

== Credits ==
- Muttley McLad – vocals, bass
- The Beater – guitar
- Chorley the Hord – drums
- Recorded on March 18, 1987 at The Cottage, Macclesfield, England
- Produced and engineered by Bald Eagle
