= Sierra de Guadalupe (Madrid Metro) =

Madrid Metro station

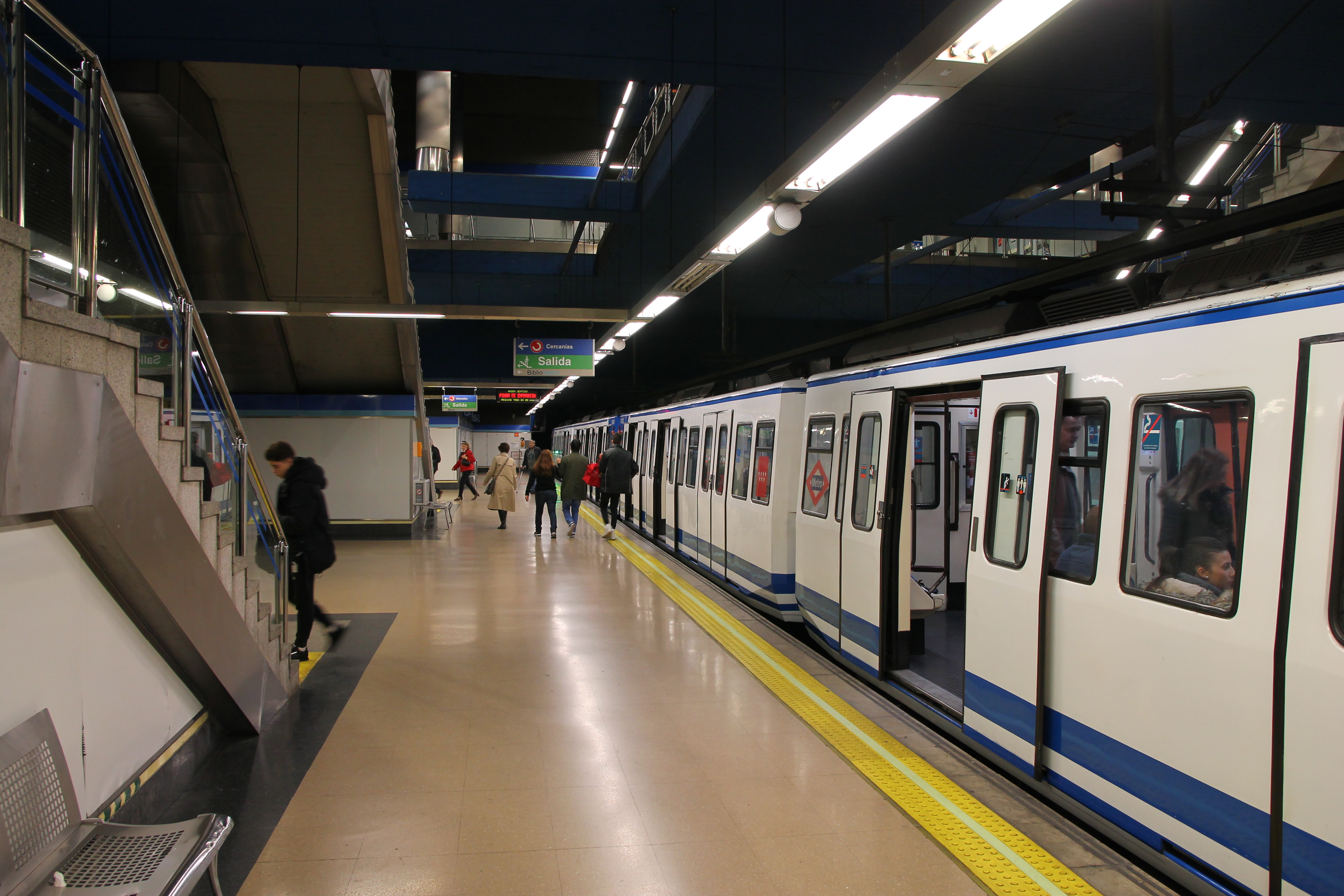
- Platform of the metro station

General information
- Location: Villa de Vallecas, Madrid; Spain
- Coordinates: 40.3825°N 3.6249°W
- System: Madrid Metro station
- Owner: CRTM
- Operator: CRTM

Construction
- Structure type: Underground
- Accessible: Yes

Other information
- Fare zone: A

History
- Opened: 3 March 1999; 27 years ago

Services
Preceding station	Madrid Metro	Following station
Miguel Hernández towards Pinar de Chamartín	Line 1	Villa de Vallecas towards Valdecarros
Location
- Location within Madrid

Sierra de Guadalupe [ˈsjera ðe ɣwaðaˈlupe] is a station on Line 1 of the Madrid Metro. It is located in fare Zone A.

The station opened on 3 March 1999.

The station is adjacent to Cercanías Madrid's Vallecas station, which is served by the C-2, C-7, and C-8 commuter rail lines.

The station is named for the calle Sierra de Guadalupe, named in turn for the Sierra de Guadalupe mountains.
