= Buenos Aires, Arizona =

Populated place in Pima County, Arizona

- Populated place
- Location within the state of Arizona Buenos Aires, Arizona (the United States)
- Coordinates: 31°31′16″N 111°39′26″W
- Country: United States
- State: Arizona
- County: Pima
- Elevation: 3,045 ft (928 m)
- Time zone: UTC-7 (Mountain (MST))
  - Summer (DST): UTC-7 (MST)
- ZIP codes: 85639
- Area code: 520
- FIPS code: 04-08185
- GNIS feature ID: 24339

Buenos Aires, also known as Buena Ayres or Buenos Ayres, is a populated place situated in Pima County, Arizona. It has an estimated elevation of 3,045 feet (928 m) above sea level. Buenos Aires is located on the Tohono Oʼodham Indian Reservation. The settlement once had its own school district (School District No. 11, Pima County), which has since become part of the Baboquivari Unified School District.
