= Beer & Sex & Chips n Gravy =

Studio album by The Macc Lads
- Released: 1985
- Recorded: The Cottage, Macclesfield, England
- Genre: Punk rock
- Length: 46:27
- Label: Hectic House; FM Records
- Producer: Bald Eagle

The Macc Lads chronology
Eh Up! (1983)	Beer & Sex & Chips n Gravy (1985)	Bitter, Fit Crack (1987)

Professional ratings
Review scores
Source	Rating
Allmusic	link

Beer & Sex & Chips n Gravy was the second full-length album from irreverent English punk rock band, The Macc Lads. It was released in 1985 and follows the self-produced debut album, Eh Up, from 1983. Bitter, Fit Crack was the third album, appearing in 1987. Track number 11, Nagasaki Sauce has been adopted by Macclesfield Cricket Club, as their 'victory song'.

== Track listing ==
- All songs written by Hatton, O'Neill, and Conning
1. "The Lads From Macc" – 2:21
2. "Beer & Sex & Chips 'n' Gravy" – 2:15
3. "Boddies" – 1:19
4. "Sweaty Betty" – 2:11
5. "England's Glory" – 2:21
6. "Blackpool" – 2:27
7. "Miss Macclesfield" – 2:51
8. "God's Gift To Women" – 2:12
9. "Get Weavin'" – 2:06
10. "Now He's A Poof" – 2:35
11. "Nagasaki Sauce" – 2:28
12. "Saturday Night" – 2:35
13. "Buenos Aires" – 2:30
14. "Charlotte" – 3:52
15. "Failure With Girls" – 2:24
16. "Do You Love Me?" – 2:13
17. "Dan's Underpant" – 2:44
18. "Twenty Pints" – 1:46
19. "The Macc Lads' Party" – 3:19

== Credits ==
- Muttley McLad – vocals, bass
- The Beater – guitar
- Stez Styx – drums
- Chorley The Hord is credited as drummer on the Snapper Music CD releases
- Recorded at The Cottage, Macclesfield, England
- Produced and engineered by Bald Eagle
