= Marruecos (Santurce) =

Subbarrio of Santurce in San Juan, Puerto Rico

Coordinates: 18°26′22″N 66°04′21″W

- Subbarrio
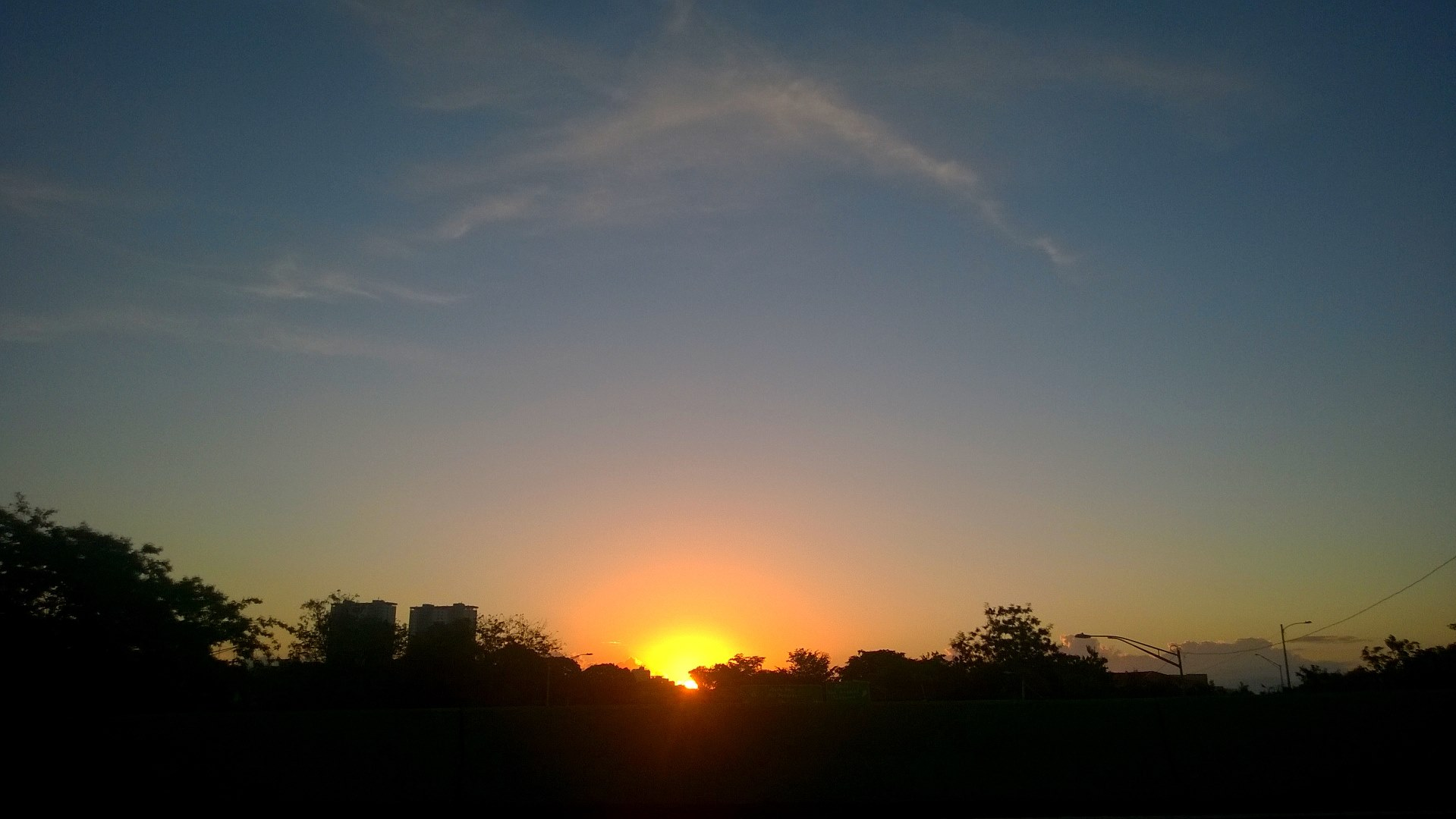
- Sunrise from Marruecos

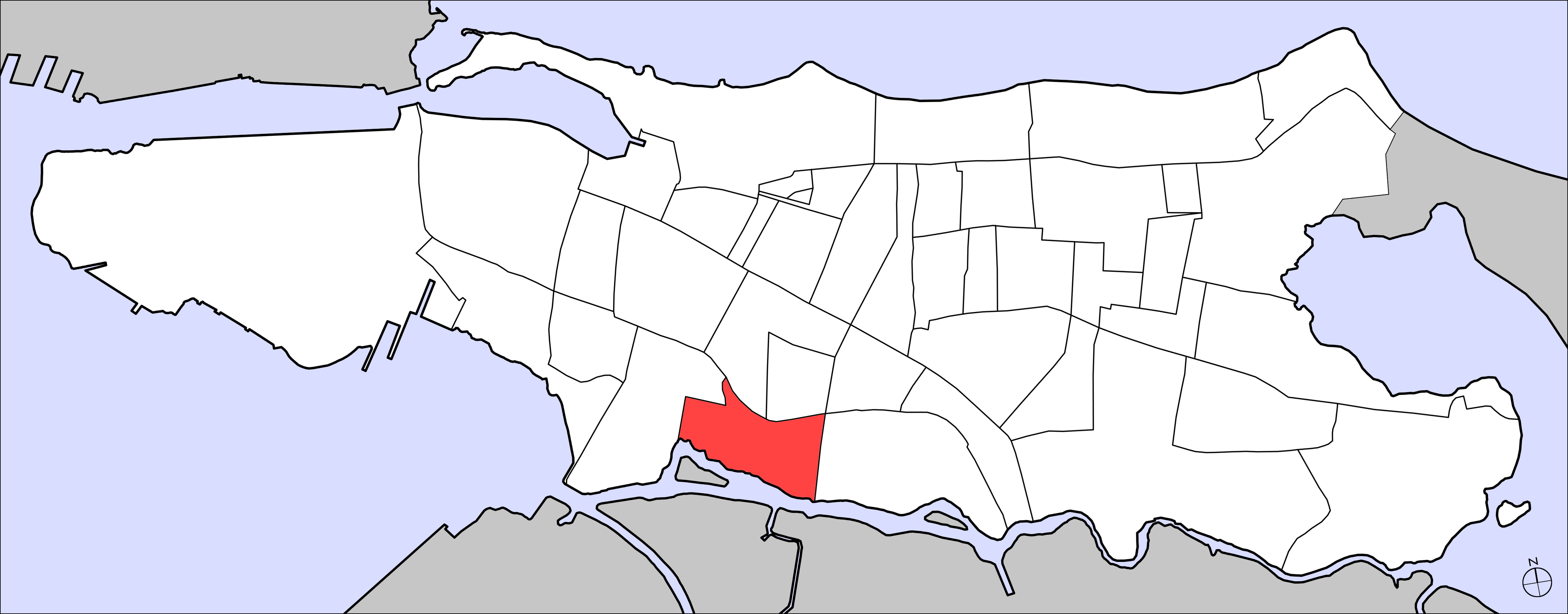
- Commonwealth: Puerto Rico
- Municipality: San Juan
- Barrio: Santurce

Area
  - Total: 0.12 sq mi (0.31 km^{2})
  - Land: 0.10 sq mi (0.26 km^{2})
  - Water: 0.02 sq mi (0.052 km^{2})
- Elevation: 0 ft (0 m)

Population (2010)
  - Total: 9
  - Density: 90/sq mi (35/km^{2})
- Source: 2010 Census
- Time zone: UTC−4 (AST)

Marruecos is one of the forty subbarrios of Santurce, San Juan, Puerto Rico.

== Demographics ==
In 1940, Marruecos had a population of 6,673.

In 2000, Marruecos had no permanent residents.

In 2010, Marruecos had a population of 9 and a population density of 90 persons per square mile.

== See also ==
- List of communities in Puerto Rico
