= Puente de Vallecas =

District of Madrid, Spain

Coordinates: 40.398204°N 3.669059°W

- District of Madrid
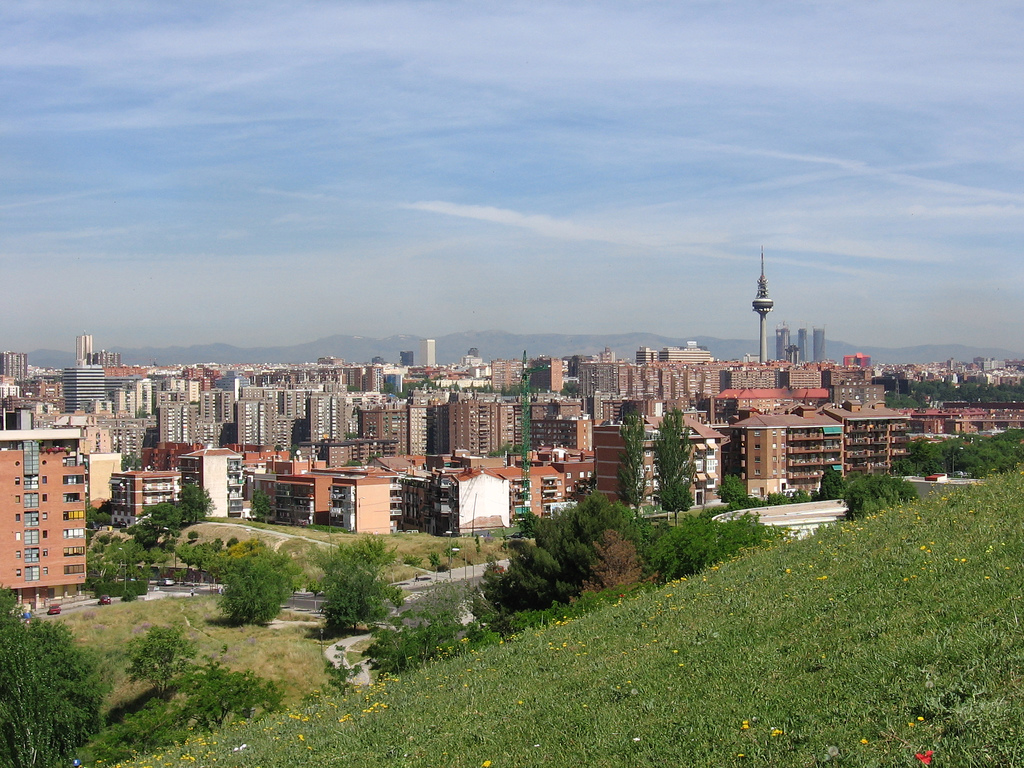
- Panoramic view

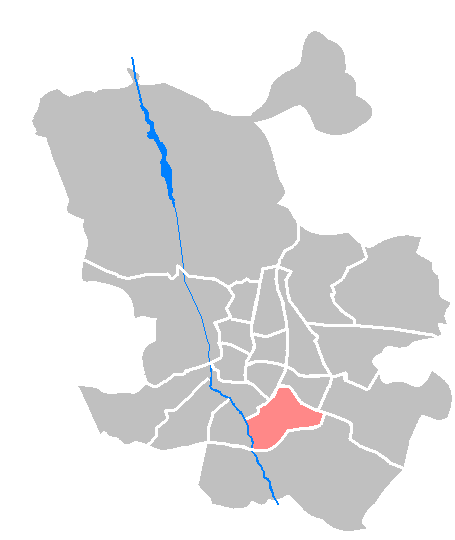
- Country: Spain
- Aut. community: Madrid
- Municipality: Madrid

Government
  - Councillor-President: Ángel Niño Quesada (PP, 2023)

Area
  - Total: 14.89 km^{2} (5.75 sq mi)

Population
  - Total: 244,151
  - Density: 16,270/km^{2} (42,100/sq mi)
- Postal codes: 28053,28018,28038, 28031
- Madrid district number: 13

Puente de Vallecas ([ˈpwente ðe βaˈʝekas], "Bridge of Vallecas") is one of the 21 districts of the city of Madrid, Spain. It forms, with the district of Villa de Vallecas, the geographical area of Vallecas.

== Geography ==
=== Subdivision ===
The district is administratively divided into 6 wards (Barrios):

- Entrevías
- Numancia
- Palomeras Bajas
- Palomeras Sureste
- Portazgo
- San Diego
