= Sagunt railway station =

Railway station in Spain

Sagunt
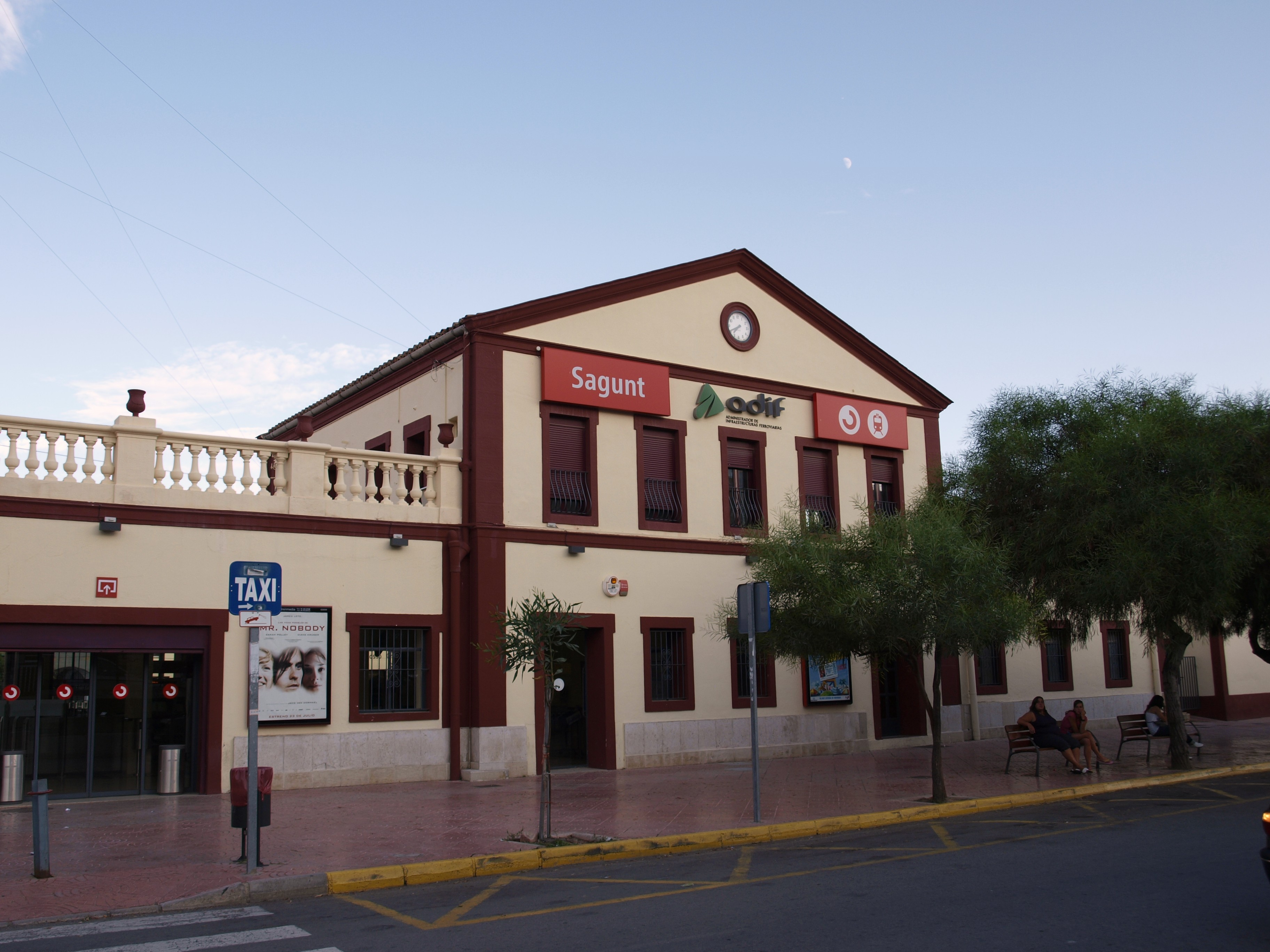
- Entrance of the station in 2010.

General information
- Owner: Adif
- Operator: Renfe
- Lines: Valencia–Sant Vicenç de Calders railway (PK 29.2); Zaragoza-Sagunt railway (PK 270.0)

History
- Opened: 1865
Location

Sagunt railway station is the central railway station serving the municipality of Sagunt, Spain. The station is situated on the intersection of the Valencia–Sant Vicenç de Calders railway and the Zaragoza-Sagunt railway and is part of Adif and it accommodates Renfe long-distance and medium-distance trains.

== Services ==
Preceding station	Renfe Operadora	Following station
Valencia-Joaquín Sorolla towards Gijón	Alvia	Castelló de la Plana towards Oropesa del Mar
Valencia Nord towards Alicante	Intercity	Castelló de la Plana towards Barcelona Sants
Valencia Nord towards Murcia del Carmen	Intercity	Castelló de la Plana towards Barcelona Sants
Valencia Nord towards Cartagena	Intercity	Castelló de la Plana towards Barcelona Sants
Valencia Nord towards Lorca-Sutullena	Intercity	Castelló de la Plana towards Barcelona Sants
Valencia-Joaquín Sorolla towards Madrid Puerta de Atocha	Intercity	Castelló de la Plana towards Vinaròs
Valencia-Cabanyal towards Valencia Nord	Intercity	Castelló de la Plana towards Barcelona Sants
Valencia-Cabanyal towards Cartagena	Intercity	Segorbe-Ciudad towards Miraflores
Valencia-Cabanyal towards Valencia Nord	Media Distancia 49	Segorbe-Ciudad towards Huesca
Valencia-Cabanyal towards Valencia Nord	Media Distancia 50	Vila-real towards Tortosa
Preceding station	Cercanías Valencia	Following station
Puçol towards Valencia Nord	C-5	Gilet towards Caudiel
Puçol towards Valencia Nord	C-6	Les Valls towards Castelló de la Plana
