= Benicarló-Peñíscola railway station =

Railway station in Spain

Benicarló-Peñíscola
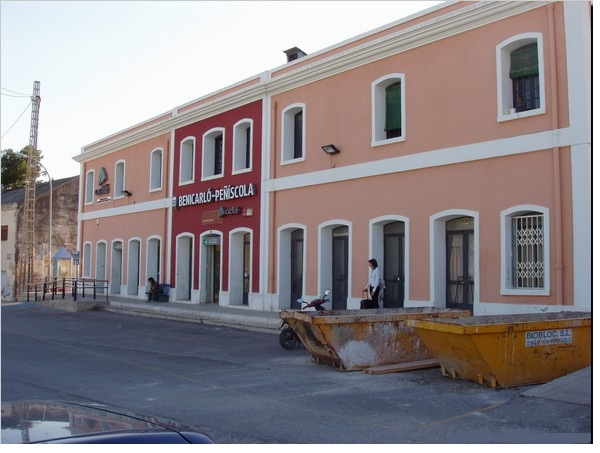
- Entrance of the station in 2012.

General information
- Owner: Adif
- Operator: Renfe
- Line: Valencia–Sant Vicenç de Calders railway

History
- Opened: 1865
Location

Benicarló-Peñíscola railway station is the central railway station serving the municipalities of Benicarló and Peñíscola, Spain. The station is situated on the Valencia–Sant Vicenç de Calders railway and is part of Adif and it accommodates Renfe long-distance and medium-distance trains.

== Services ==
Preceding station	Renfe Operadora	Following station
Oropesa del Mar towards Alicante	Intercity	Vinaròs towards Barcelona Sants
Oropesa del Mar towards Murcia del Carmen	Intercity	Vinaròs towards Barcelona Sants
Benicàssim towards Cartagena	Intercity	Vinaròs towards Barcelona Sants
Benicàssim towards Lorca-Sutullena	Intercity	Vinaròs towards Barcelona Sants
Castelló de la Plana towards Seville-Santa Justa	Intercity	Vinaròs towards Barcelona Sants
Castelló de la Plana towards Cádiz	Intercity Torre del Oro	Vinaròs towards Barcelona Sants
Oropesa del Mar towards Valencia Nord	Intercity	Vinaròs towards Barcelona Sants
Oropesa del Mar towards Madrid Puerta de Atocha	Intercity	Vinaròs Terminus
Alcalà de Xivert towards Valencia Nord	Media Distancia 50	Vinaròs towards Tortosa
