= Benicàssim railway station =

Railway station in Benicàssim, Spain

Benicàssim
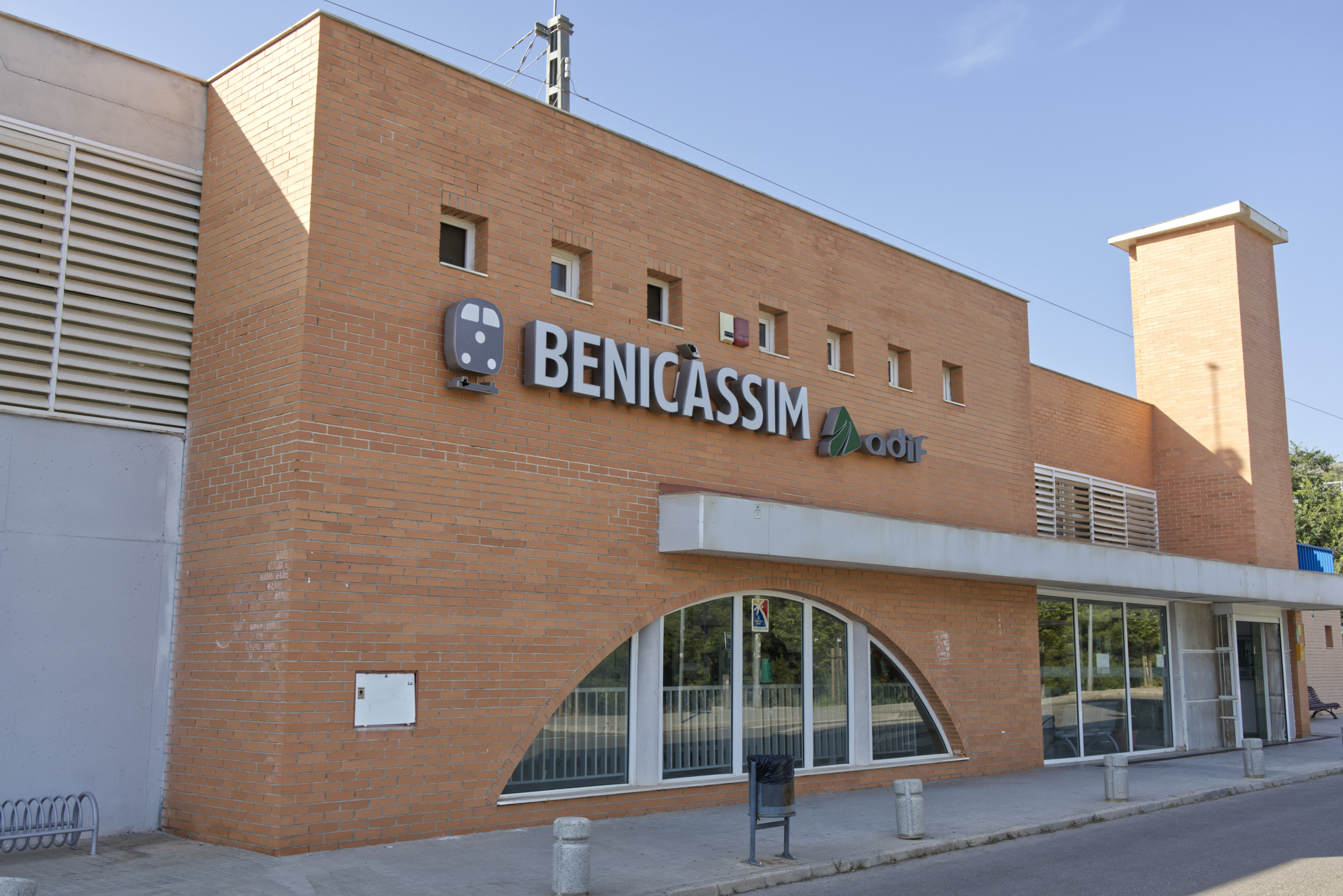

General information
- Location: Benicàssim, Valencian Community
- Owner: Adif
- Operator: Renfe
- Line: Valencia–Sant Vicenç de Calders (PK 82.1)
Location

Benicàssim railway station is the main railway station of Benicàssim, Spain. The station is part of Adif and is served by Renfe Alvia long-distance and medium-distance trains.

== Services ==
Preceding station	Renfe Operadora	Following station
Castelló de la Plana towards Gijón	Alvia	Oropesa del Mar Terminus
Castelló de la Plana towards Alicante	Intercity	Oropesa del Mar towards Barcelona Sants
Castelló de la Plana towards Murcia del Carmen	Intercity	Oropesa del Mar towards Barcelona Sants
Castelló de la Plana towards Cartagena	Intercity	Benicarló-Peñíscola towards Barcelona Sants
Castelló de la Plana towards Lorca-Sutullena	Intercity	Benicarló-Peñíscola towards Barcelona Sants
Castelló de la Plana towards Madrid Puerta de Atocha	Intercity	Oropesa del Mar towards Vinaròs
Castelló de la Plana towards Valencia Nord	Intercity	Benicarló-Peñíscola towards Barcelona Sants
Castelló de la Plana towards Valencia Nord	Media Distancia 50	Oropesa del Mar towards Tortosa
