= Castelló de la Plana railway station =

Railway station in Spain

Coordinates: 39°59′18″N 0°3′9″W

Castelló de la Plana
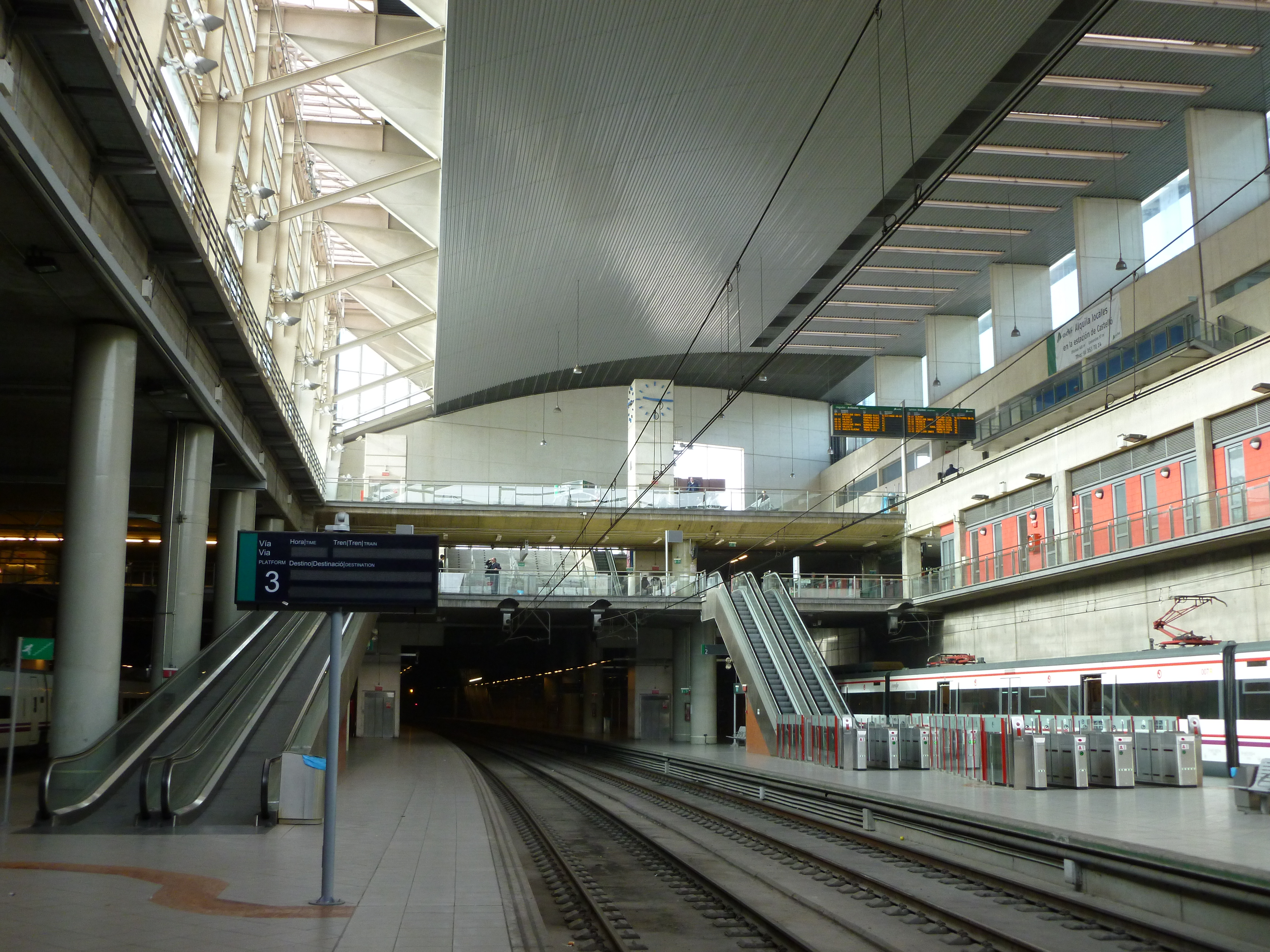
- Interior of the station in 2012.

General information
- Owner: Adif
- Operator: Renfe
- Line: Valencia–Sant Vicenç de Calders (PK 69.2)
- Connections: TRAM line T1 (trolleybus)

History
- Opened: 2010

Passengers
- 2018: 2,544,567
Location

Castelló de la Plana railway station (IATA: CPJ) is the central railway station of Castelló de la Plana, Spain. It is located on Carrer del Pintor Oliet on the west side of the town centre. The station is part of Adif and it accommodates AVE high-speed trains, as well as Renfe Alvia long-distance and medium-distance trains.

== Services ==
Preceding station	Renfe Operadora	Following station
Valencia-Joaquín Sorolla towards Madrid Puerta de Atocha	AVE	Terminus
Sagunt towards Gijón	Alvia	Benicàssim towards Oropesa del Mar
Valencia-Joaquín Sorolla Terminus	Euromed	Camp de Tarragona towards Barcelona Sants
Valencia-Joaquín Sorolla towards Alicante	Euromed	Camp de Tarragona towards Barcelona Sants
Sagunt towards Alicante	Intercity	Benicàssim towards Barcelona Sants
Sagunt towards Murcia del Carmen	Intercity	Benicàssim towards Barcelona Sants
Sagunt towards Cartagena	Intercity	Benicàssim towards Barcelona Sants
Sagunt towards Lorca-Sutullena	Intercity	Benicàssim towards Barcelona Sants
Valencia Nord towards Seville-Santa Justa	Intercity	Benicarló-Peñíscola towards Barcelona Sants
Valencia Nord towards Cádiz	Intercity Torre del Oro	Benicarló-Peñíscola towards Barcelona Sants
Sagunt towards Madrid Puerta de Atocha	Intercity	Benicàssim towards Vinaròs
Sagunt towards Valencia Nord	Intercity	Benicàssim towards Barcelona Sants
Villarreal towards Valencia Nord	Media Distancia 50	Benicàssim towards Tortosa
Preceding station	Cercanías Valencia	Following station
Almassora towards Valencia Nord	C-6	Terminus
