= Camp de Tarragona railway station =

Railway station in Spain

Camp de Tarragona
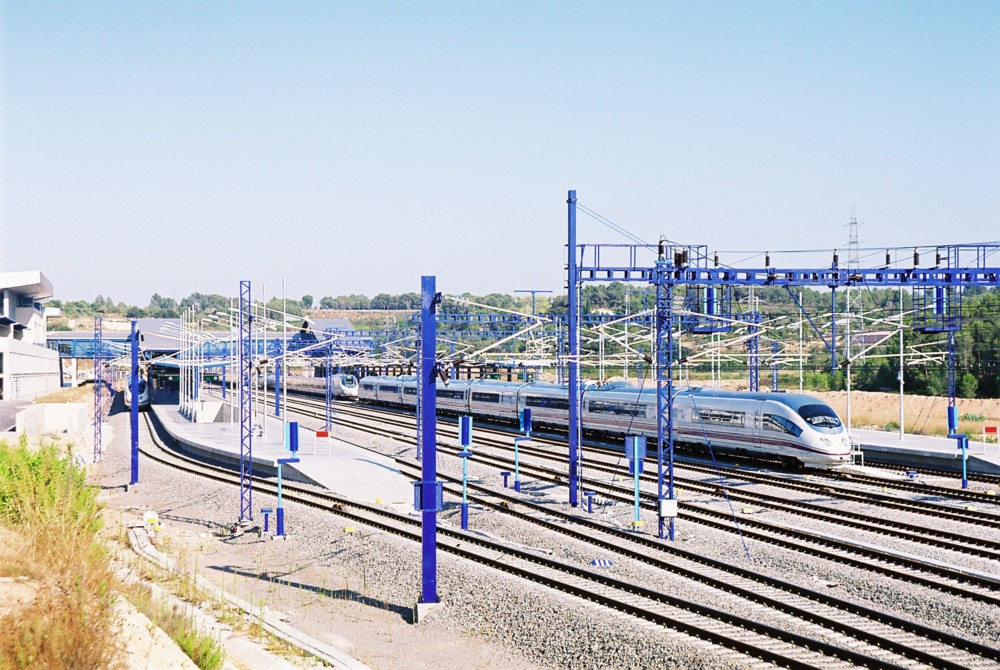
- A Renfe Operadora's AVE Siemens Velaro EMU calling at Camp de Tarragona

General information
- Location: Local road TV-2231; 43765 La Secuita; Spain
- Coordinates: 41°11′31.85″N 1°16′26.63″E
- Owner: Adif
- Operator: Renfe Operadora
- Line: Madrid–Barcelona (high-speed) (PK 520.9)
- Platforms: 2 island platforms
- Tracks: 8 (4 of which are for non-stopping trains)
- Connections: Local and interurban buses

Construction
- Structure type: At-grade
- Parking: The station has an underground pay parking garage.
- Accessible: Yes

Other information
- Station code: 04104

History
- Opened: 9 December 2006

Passengers
- 2018: 900,000

Services
| Preceding station | Ouigo España | Following station |
|---|---|---|
| Zaragoza–Delicias towards Madrid Atocha | Madrid to Barcelona | Barcelona Sants Terminus |
Location

Camp de Tarragona is a railway station, opened on 19 December 2006, on the Madrid–Barcelona high-speed rail line between Madrid and Barcelona. Located between the municipalities of La Secuita and Perafort, some 8 km north of Tarragona itself, the new station serves an area with an estimated population of over 400,000.

The station complex, covering 5.2 hectares (13 acres), has eight standard-gauge tracks (four platform tracks and four central through tracks), two 400-metre-long island platforms, passenger handling facilities, a travel centre, shops, and parking for 648 vehicles.

The high speed railway to the French frontier opened for service in 2013.

== Rail services ==
| Preceding station | Renfe Operadora | Following station |
|---|---|---|
| Lleida Pirineus towards Madrid Puerta de Atocha | AVE | Barcelona Sants Terminus |
| Lleida Pirineus towards Madrid Puerta de Atocha | AVE | Barcelona Sants towards Figueres-Vilafant |
| Lleida Pirineus towards Seville-Santa Justa | AVE | Barcelona Sants Terminus |
| Lleida Pirineus towards Málaga María Zambrano | AVE | Barcelona Sants Terminus |
| Lleida Pirineus towards Madrid Puerta de Atocha | Avlo | Barcelona Sants towards Figueres-Vilafant |
| Lleida Pirineus towards Bilbao Abando | Alvia | Barcelona Sants Terminus |
| Lleida Pirineus towards Hendaye | Alvia | Barcelona Sants Terminus |
| Lleida Pirineus towards A Coruña | Alvia | Barcelona Sants Terminus |
| Lleida Pirineus towards Vigo-Guixar | Alvia | Barcelona Sants Terminus |
| Lleida Pirineus towards Gijón | Alvia | Barcelona Sants Terminus |
| Castelló de la Plana towards Valencia-Joaquín Sorolla | Euromed | Barcelona Sants Terminus |
| Castelló de la Plana towards Alicante | Euromed | Barcelona Sants Terminus |
| Lleida Pirineus towards A Coruña or Vigo-Guixar | Trenhotel Galicia | Barcelona Sants Terminus |
| Cambrils towards Alicante | Intercity | Barcelona Sants Terminus |
| Cambrils towards Murcia del Carmen | Intercity | Barcelona Sants Terminus |
| Cambrils towards Cartagena | Intercity | Barcelona Sants Terminus |
| Cambrils towards Lorca-Sutullena | Intercity | Barcelona Sants Terminus |
| Cambrils towards Seville-Santa Justa | Intercity | Barcelona Sants Terminus |
| Cambrils towards Cádiz | Intercity Torre del Oro | Barcelona Sants Terminus |
| Lleida Pirineus Terminus | Avant | Barcelona Sants Terminus |
| Cambrils towards Tortosa | Avant | Barcelona Sants Terminus |
