= Cuenca–Fernando Zóbel railway station =

Railway station in Cuenca, Spain

Cuenca-Fernando Zóbel
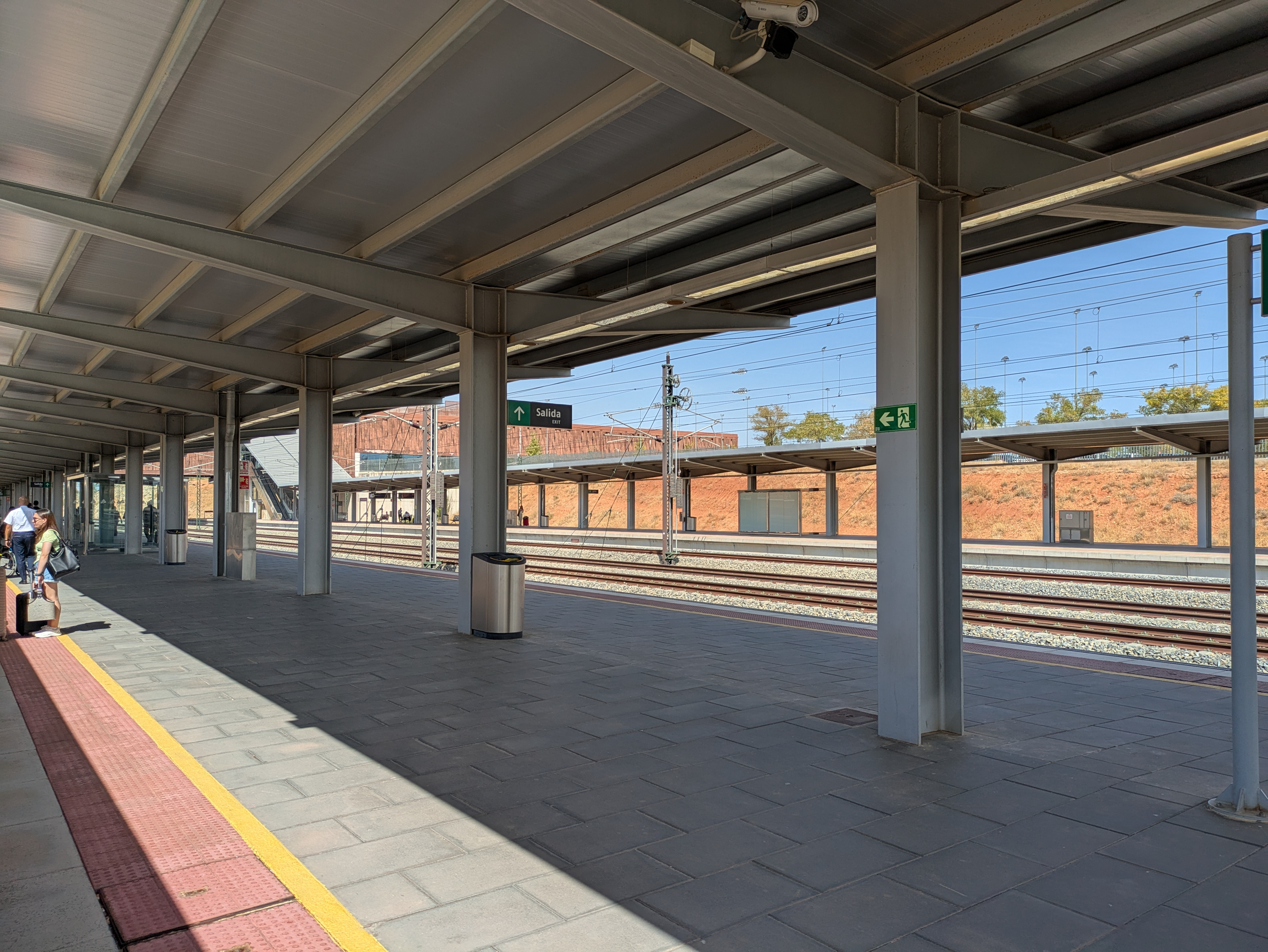

General information
- Coordinates: 40°2′5″N 2°8′41″W
- Owner: Adif
- Operator: Renfe
- Line: Madrid–Levante high-speed rail network

History
- Opened: December 2010

Passengers
- 2018: 398,689
Location

Cuenca – Fernando Zóbel Railway Station (IATA: CEJ) is the new railway station in Cuenca, Spain, located 5 kilometres (3.1 mi) from the city centre. The station is named after painter Fernando Zóbel to commemorate his links to the city. It occupies 3.950 square metres (42.52 sq ft) with 8.900 square metres (95.80 sq ft) of parking space. It is operated by Renfe and part of Adif and high-speed rail systems.

== History ==
Cuenca has been served by the railroad since 1885, and had a station on the old Aranjuez - Valencia Railway. On 2010 December 19 a new AVE (high-speed rail) link was established on the Madrid–Levante high-speed rail line between Madrid – Atocha station and Cuenca – Fernando Zobel station, but Renfe kept a daily Media Distancia service between Madrid (Aranjuez in the weekend) and Valencia via the old line taking 3 hours to Madrid and another 3 hours to Valencia, until the section between Tarancón and Utiel was closed on 20 July 2022 and left Cuenca without a station within the city centre.

== Facilities ==
Cuenca, Spain is a popular day or weekend trip from Madrid, with frequent AVE, AVLO, Alvia, Avant and Iryo trains between Madrid and Valencia or Alicante serving the station. There is a large car park for 250 cars, ticket machines as well as a ticket counter, toilets, and a small commercial area. A shuttle bus line L10 connects the station to bus station near the city centre every 15 minutes in approximately 15 minutes.

== Services ==
Preceding station	Renfe Operadora	Following station
Madrid Chamartín Terminus	AVE	Requena-Utiel towards Valencia-Joaquín Sorolla
Madrid Chamartín Terminus	AVE	Albacete-Los Llanos towards Alicante
Madrid Chamartín Terminus	AVE	Albacete-Los Llanos towards Murcia del Carmen
Madrid Puerta de Atocha Terminus	AVE	Albacete-Los Llanos towards Murcia del Carmen
Madrid Puerta de Atocha Terminus	AVE	Valencia-Joaquín Sorolla towards Castelló de la Plana
Ciudad Real towards Seville-Santa Justa	AVE	Valencia-Joaquín Sorolla Terminus
Madrid Chamartín Terminus	Avlo	Requena-Utiel towards Valencia-Joaquín Sorolla
Madrid Chamartín Terminus	Avlo	Albacete-Los Llanos towards Alicante
Madrid Chamartín Terminus	Avlo	Albacete-Los Llanos towards Murcia del Carmen
Madrid Puerta de Atocha towards Gijón	Alvia	Albacete-Los Llanos towards Alicante
Madrid Puerta de Atocha towards A Coruña	Alvia	Albacete-Los Llanos towards Alicante
Madrid Puerta de Atocha towards Pontevedra	Alvia	Albacete-Los Llanos towards Alicante
Madrid Puerta de Atocha towards Santander	Alvia	Albacete-Los Llanos towards Alicante
Madrid Puerta de Atocha Terminus	Intercity	Valencia-Joaquín Sorolla towards Vinaròs
Madrid Puerta de Atocha Terminus	Intercity	Valencia-Joaquín Sorolla towards Gandía
