= Villena AV railway station =

Railway station in Villena, Spain

Villena AV
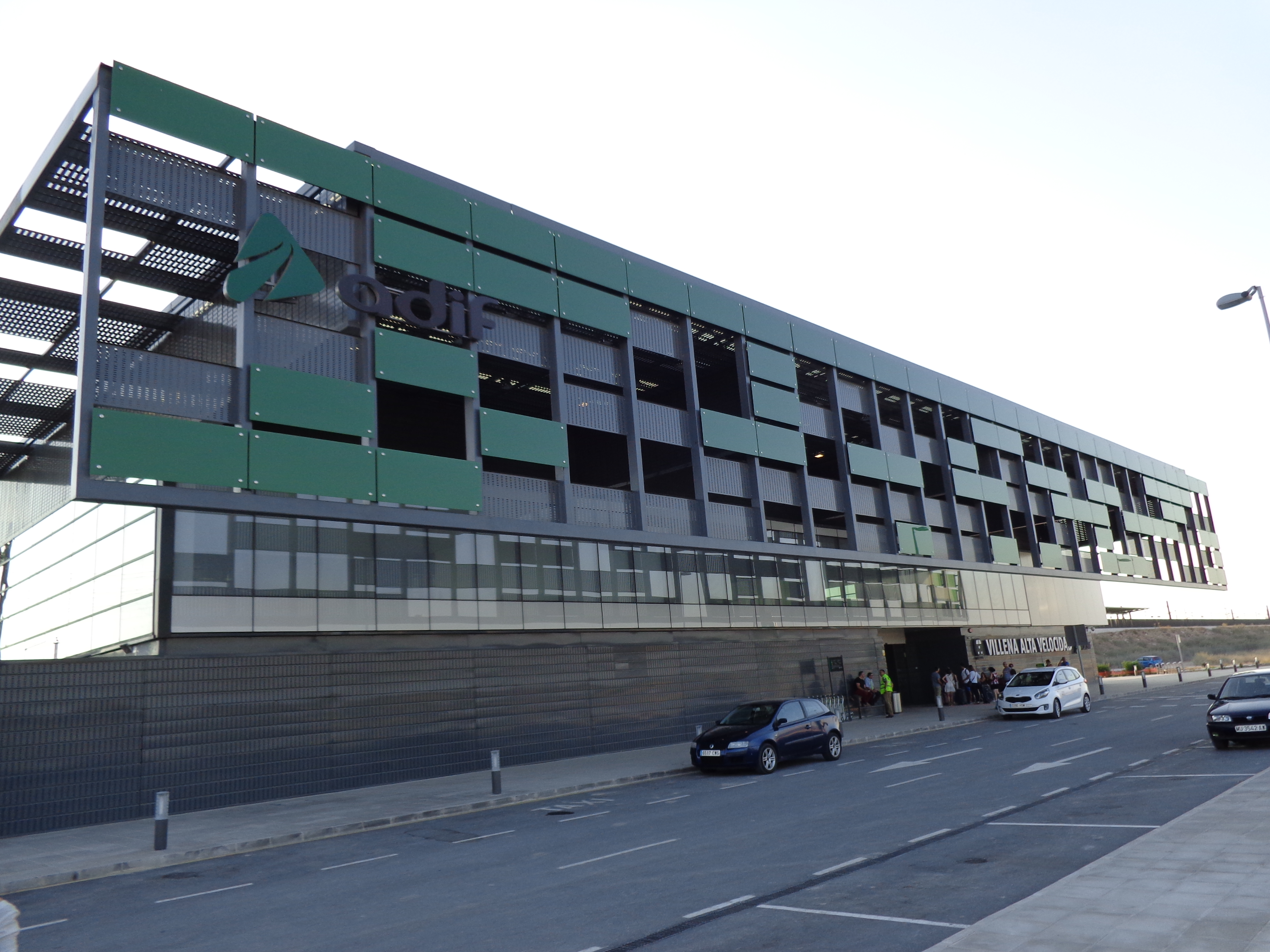

General information
- Coordinates: 38.5846°N 0.8734°W
- Owner: Adif
- Operator: Renfe
- Line: Madrid–Levante high-speed rail network

History
- Opened: 2013

Passengers
- 2018: 92,677
Location

Villena AV railway station (Villena Alta Velocidad) is a railway station serving the Spanish town of Villena in the Valencian Community. Located 6 kilometres (3.7 mi) from the town centre, it is served by the Spanish AVE high-speed rail system, on the Madrid–Levante high-speed rail network.

== History ==
The station was built in 2013 at a cost of €11.5 million. It has since been criticised for being one of the least-used stations on the entire AVE network, with 25,859 in 2014. Passengers have increased substantially in the subsequent years, to 92,677 in 2018.

== Access ==
In 2014 the Province of Alicante allocated €300,000 to improve road access to the station via the Autovía A-31. No public transport serves the station, which has been seen as a reason behind its low patronage.

== Services ==
Preceding station	Renfe Operadora	Following station
Albacete-Los Llanos towards Madrid Chamartín	AVE	Alicante Terminus
Albacete-Los Llanos towards Madrid Chamartín	Avlo	Alicante Terminus
Albacete-Los Llanos towards Madrid Chamartín	Avlo	Alicante towards Murcia del Carmen
Albacete-Los Llanos towards A Coruña	Alvia	Alicante Terminus
Albacete-Los Llanos towards Gijón	Alvia	Alicante Terminus
Albacete-Los Llanos towards Pontevedra	Alvia	Alicante Terminus
Albacete-Los Llanos towards Santander	Alvia	Alicante Terminus
