= Oropesa del Mar railway station =

Train station in Oropesa del Mar, Spain

Oropesa del Mar

General information
- Location: Oropesa del Mar, Valencian Community
- Owner: Adif
- Operator: Renfe
- Line: Valencia–Sant Vicenç de Calders

History
- Opened: 1863

Passengers
- 2018: 2,544,567
Location

Oropesa del Mar railway station is the central railway station of Oropesa del Mar, Spain. The station is part of Adif and is served by Renfe Alvia long-distance and medium-distance trains.

== Services ==
Preceding station	Renfe Operadora	Following station
Benicàssim towards Gijón	Alvia	Terminus
Benicàssim towards Alicante	Intercity	Benicarló-Peñíscola towards Barcelona Sants
Benicàssim towards Murcia del Carmen	Intercity	Benicarló-Peñíscola towards Barcelona Sants
Benicàssim towards Madrid Puerta de Atocha	Intercity	Benicarló-Peñíscola towards Vinaròs
Benicàssim towards Valencia Nord	Media Distancia 50	Torreblanca towards Tortosa
