= Valencia-Joaquín Sorolla railway station =

Railway station in Valencia, Spain

Valencia-Joaquín Sorolla
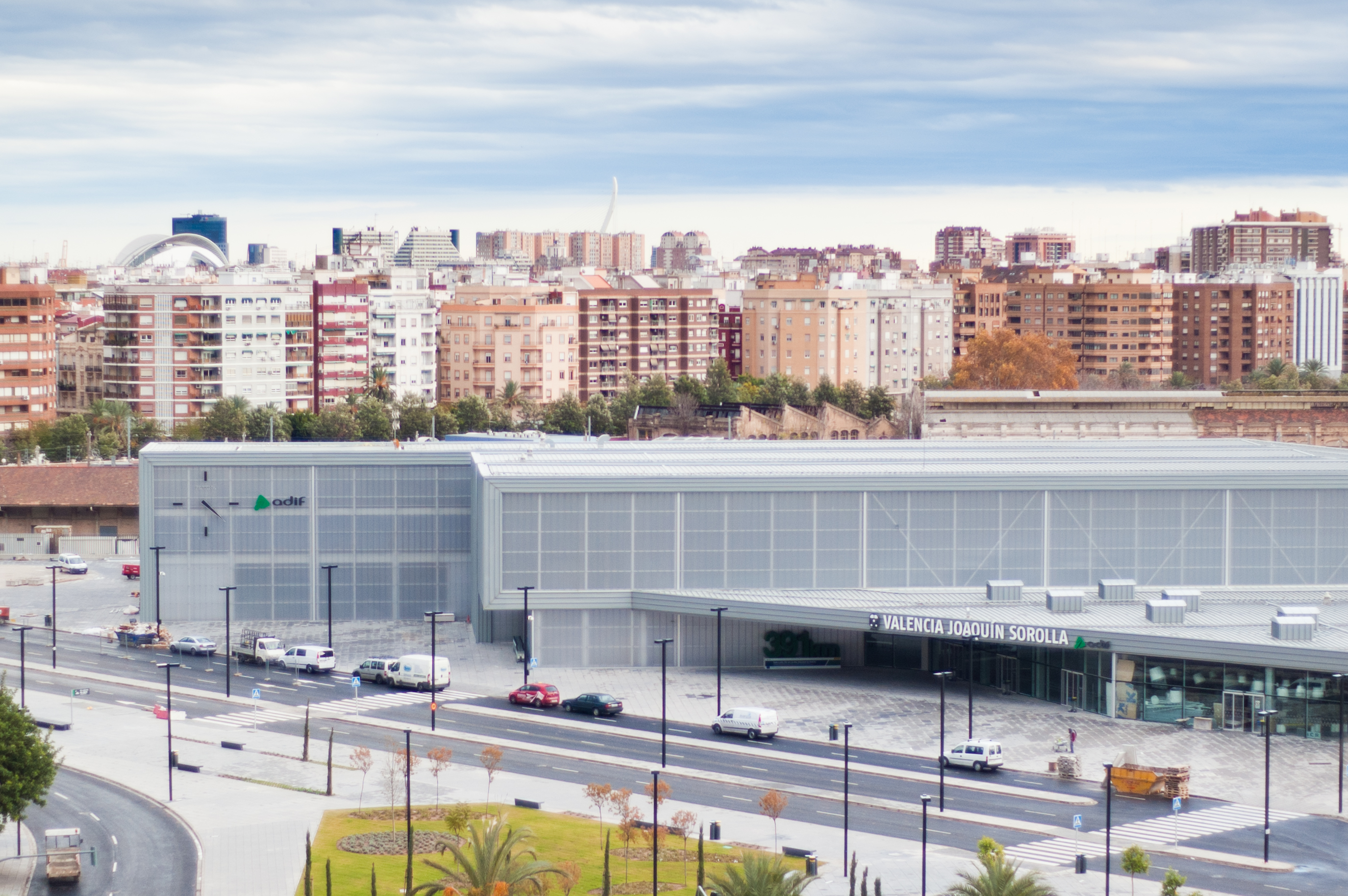
- Station exterior

General information
- Owner: Adif
- Operator: Renfe
- Line: Madrid–Levante high-speed rail network
- Platforms: 6
- Tracks: 9
- Connections: Metrovalencia: at Jesús (Av. de Giorgeta) at Xàtiva (C/ de Xàtiva); EMT

History
- Opened: 2010

Passengers
- 2018: 3,976,488

Services
Preceding station	Ouigo España	Following station
Madrid Chamartín Terminus	Madrid to Valencia	Terminus
Location

Valencia-Joaquín Sorolla railway station is a railway station in Valencia, Spain, opened in 2010. Along with Estació del Nord, it is a city centre terminus station, primarily serving AVE high-speed rail services, with Estació del Nord serving all other passenger rail traffic.

== History ==
The station was inaugurated in 2010 along with the high-speed railway from Madrid to Valencia. It was named after painter Joaquín Sorolla, who was born in the city.

== Services ==
Valencia-Joaquín Sorolla station primarily serves AVE trains to Madrid Chamartín and Seville-Santa Justa via Requena-Utiel, with some continuing to Castelló de la Plana.

Alvia trains call at the station on the Oropesa del Mar to Gijón service, as do Euromed services between Alicante and Barcelona França. Intercity trains also operate from Madrid to Gandia via Joaquín Sorolla.

The nearest Metrovalencia station is Jesús.

Preceding station	Renfe Operadora	Following station
Requena-Utiel towards Madrid Chamartín	AVE	Terminus
Cuenca-Fernando Zóbel towards Madrid Puerta de Atocha	AVE	Castelló de la Plana Terminus
Cuenca-Fernando Zóbel towards Seville-Santa Justa	AVE	Terminus
Requena-Utiel towards Madrid Chamartín	Avlo	Terminus
Madrid Puerta de Atocha towards Gijón	Alvia	Sagunt towards Oropesa del Mar
Castelló de la Plana towards Barcelona Sants	Euromed	Terminus
Castelló de la Plana towards Barcelona Sants	Euromed	Alicante Terminus
Cuenca-Fernando Zóbel towards Madrid Puerta de Atocha	Intercity	Sagunt towards Vinaròs
Cuenca-Fernando Zóbel towards Madrid Puerta de Atocha	Intercity	Cullera towards Gandía
Requena-Utiel Terminus	Avant	Terminus

== Future ==
A new Valencia Central Station will be built that eventually replaces the existing Valencia North and Joaquín Sorolla stations. It will be 12 tracks wide in 2 subterranean levels.
