= Requena-Utiel railway station =

Requena-Utiel
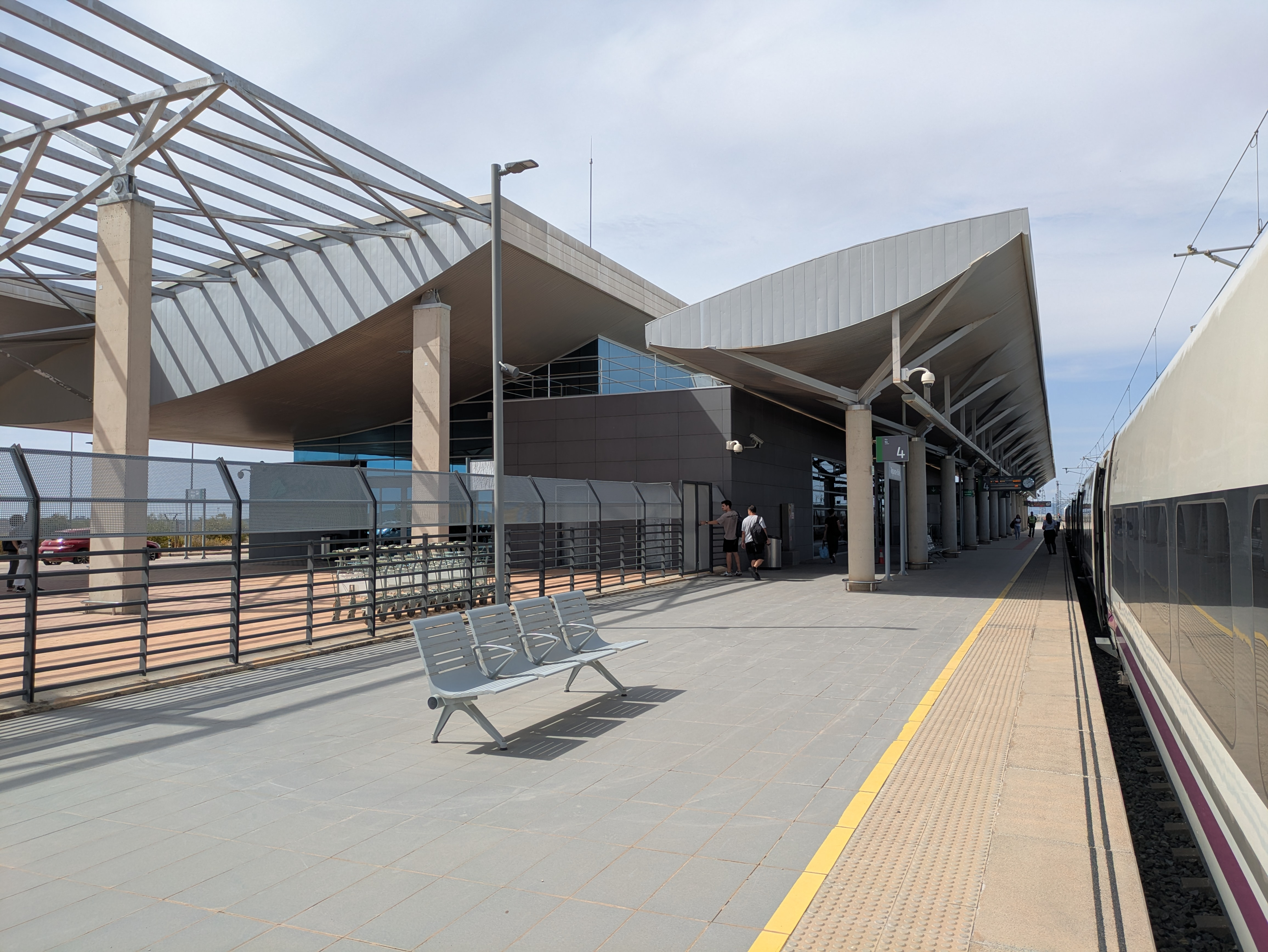

General information
- Coordinates: 39.5218°N 1.1349°W
- Owner: Adif
- Operator: Renfe
- Line: Madrid–Levante high-speed rail network

History
- Opened: 2010

Passengers
- 2018: 26,043
Location

Requena-Utiel railway station is a railway station serving the Spanish towns of Requena and Utiel in the Valencian Community. It is served by the Spanish AVE high-speed rail system, on the Madrid–Levante high-speed rail network.

== History ==
The station was built in 2010 at a cost of €12.4 million. It has been described as being "designed to favour rational use of energy. For this, energy efficiency, thermal insulation and energy saving criteria have been taken into account, so it will include thermal solar panels to produce hot water and photovoltaic panels to receive solar energy and transform it into electrical energy." Since opening, the station has been criticised for being one of the least-used stations on the entire AVE network, with "less than 20 passengers a day" in 2016.

== Services ==
Preceding station	Renfe Operadora	Following station
Cuenca–Fernando Zóbel towards Madrid Chamartín	AVE	Valencia-Joaquín Sorolla Terminus
Cuenca–Fernando Zóbel towards Madrid Chamartín	Avlo	Valencia-Joaquín Sorolla Terminus
Terminus	Avant	Valencia-Joaquín Sorolla Terminus
