= Chinchilla–Cartagena railway =

Iberian-gauge railway in Spain

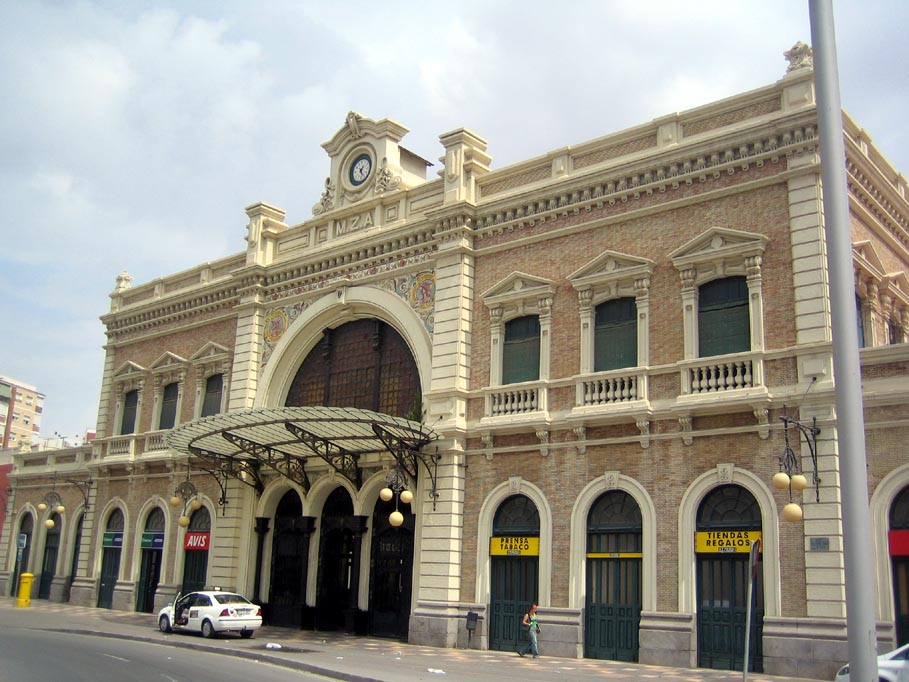
- Cartagena estacion

Overview
- Status: Operational
- Owner: Adif
- Termini: Chinchilla de Montearagón; Cartagena

Service
- Operator(s): Renfe Operadora

History
- Opened: 1863 (Murcia–Cartagena); 1865 (Chinchilla–Murcia)

Technical
- Line length: 227.7 km (141.5 mi)
- Track gauge: 1,668 mm (5 ft 5 21/32 in) Iberian gauge

The Chinchilla–Cartagena railway is an Iberian-gauge railway in Spain.

== History ==
The line was completed between 1863 and 1863. In 2003, the Chinchilla train crash occurred on the line, where a passenger train and a freight train collided, killing 19 people and injuring 38.

In 2018, the Alvia 730 service began, enabling travel times between Cartagena to Madrid, via the line to Chinchilla, of three hours and thirty-two minutes.

== Route ==
The line begins as a branch from the Madrid–Valencia railway at Chinchilla and passes through Murcia del Carmen to terminate in Cartagena. In 2019, 26 km of new, more direct track between Cieza and Agramón opened, shortening journey times by 20 minutes.
