= Madrid–Levante high-speed rail network =

Railway network in Spain

- Current network in 2023 (in red)

Overview
- Status: Operational
- Owner: Adif
- Locale: Spain (Community of Madrid, Castilla-La Mancha, Valencian Community)
- Termini: Madrid Puerta de Atocha; Valencia-Joaquín Sorolla/Alicante

Service
- Type: High-speed rail
- Operator: Renfe Operadora
- Rolling stock: 100, 112, and 130
- Ridership: 5.4 million (2018)

History
- Opened: 18 December 2010 (Madrid-Albacete-Valencia); 17 June 2013 (Albacete-Alicante); 1 February 2021 (Villena-Elche-Orihuela); 1 July 2022 Túnel de la risa

Technical
- Line length: 603 km (375 mi)
- Number of tracks: Double track
- Track gauge: 1,435 mm (4 ft 8 1/2 in) standard gauge
- Electrification: 25 kV 50 Hz AC from overhead catenary

The Madrid–Levante high-speed network is a network of high-speed rail lines that connects Madrid with the Mediterranean coast of the Levante Region, specifically with Castilla–La Mancha, the Valencian Community and the Region of Murcia autonomous communities.

The network extends from Madrid to the east, with branches ending in Castellón, Alicante, Elche, Murcia, Cartagena and continuing from Murcia to Almería.

When fully operational the Madrid–Levante network will total 955 km (593 mi) of high-speed rail capable of top speeds of 350 km/h (217 mph) in the majority of its segments.

== Segments ==
=== Madrid–Cuenca–Motilla del Palancar–Valencia ===
The first 28 km (17 mi) of this 391 km (243 mi) line are shared with the existing Madrid–Seville high-speed rail line. The section onwards to Valencia was inaugurated on 15 December 2010 and entered service on 19 December 2010.

Thirty trains run every day, fifteen in each direction. 22 are non-stop services and the remaining eight call at intermediate stations.

Non-stop trains between Madrid and Valencia cover the 391 km (243 mi) in 1 hour and 40 minutes, saving two hours on the previous service of Alaris trains on the classic line.

The line is built to 1,435 mm (4 ft 8 1/2 in) standard gauge, and electric powered at 25 kV AC, with signalling ERTMS levels 1 and 2.

During the 2007 works, the fossil site of Lo Hueco, Fuentes (Cuenca), was discovered. More than 10 000 fossils have been collected, almost half of which belong to titanosaurs comprising more than twenty sets of partial skeletons in anatomical connection or with a low dispersion of their skeletal elements.

=== Valencia–Castellón ===
This segment was inaugurated on 22 January 2018 and is a part of the Mediterranean Corridor. With this extension to Castellón a new AVE service Madrid-Castellón was introduced which cut the journey time between the two cities by further 30 minutes to total 2 hours and 25 minutes.

Four AVE trains per day are scheduled, two in each direction between Madrid and Castellón while this segment is also used by the Alvia service Gijón–Castellón.

=== Valencia–Xàtiva ===
This segment is under construction and planned for mixed use (goods and passengers). The 52 km part between Torrent outside Valencia and Xàtiva, which is under construction since October 2002, was initially expected to be completed by end 2020 and it is designed for speeds up to 350 km/h.

=== Xàtiva–Nudo de La Encina ===
Since 9 September 2023 this 41.2 km (25.6 mi) segment is closed for modernisation works to high-speed rail standards. All traffic in this segment is now routed via the conventional Iberian-gauge line between Xàtiva and La Encina Hub. Those modernization works including conversion to standard-gauge high speed line were initially expected to be completed by end 2022 and with additional works for adding a double track in the same section, those are now expected to be finished by middle 2025 at latest.

=== Motilla del Palancar–Albacete ===
A 62.8 km (39.0 mi) segment between Cuenca and Albacete provinces. This section was inaugurated on 15 December and open to the public on 19 December 2010.

=== Albacete–Nudo de La Encina–Monforte del Cid–Alicante ===
The 171.5 km (106.6 mi) section from Albacete to Alicante opened in June 2013.

=== Monforte del Cid–Elche–Murcia–Cartagena ===
The segment between the municipality of Monforte del Cid in Alicante and Murcia has a length of 67.1 kilometres (41.7 mi), of which 46.2 km (28.7 mi) are located in the province of Alicante and the remaining 15.5 km (9.6 mi) in Murcia. It is a new segment of double track in standard gauge, suitable for speeds up to 350 km/h (217 mph). The 8.9 km (5.5 mi) long access section towards the new segment to Murcia had been in service since 2008, and was only used for Iberian gauge trains until 1 February 2021, when the section linking Monforte del Cid, Elche and Orihuela - 48.4 km (30.1 mi) in total length - was inaugurated. The continuation of the line up to Murcia put in service on 20 December 2022. This section is fitted with three track rails, two of standard gauge and one of Iberian gauge.

=== Murcia–Almería ===
The main purpose of this line is to connect the Transversal Rail Line to the Madrid-Levante and Mediterranean Corridor rail lines. This segment is 184.3 km (114.5 mi) (108.1 km (67.2 mi) in Almería Province and 76.2 km (47.3 mi) in Murcia Region).

== Stations ==
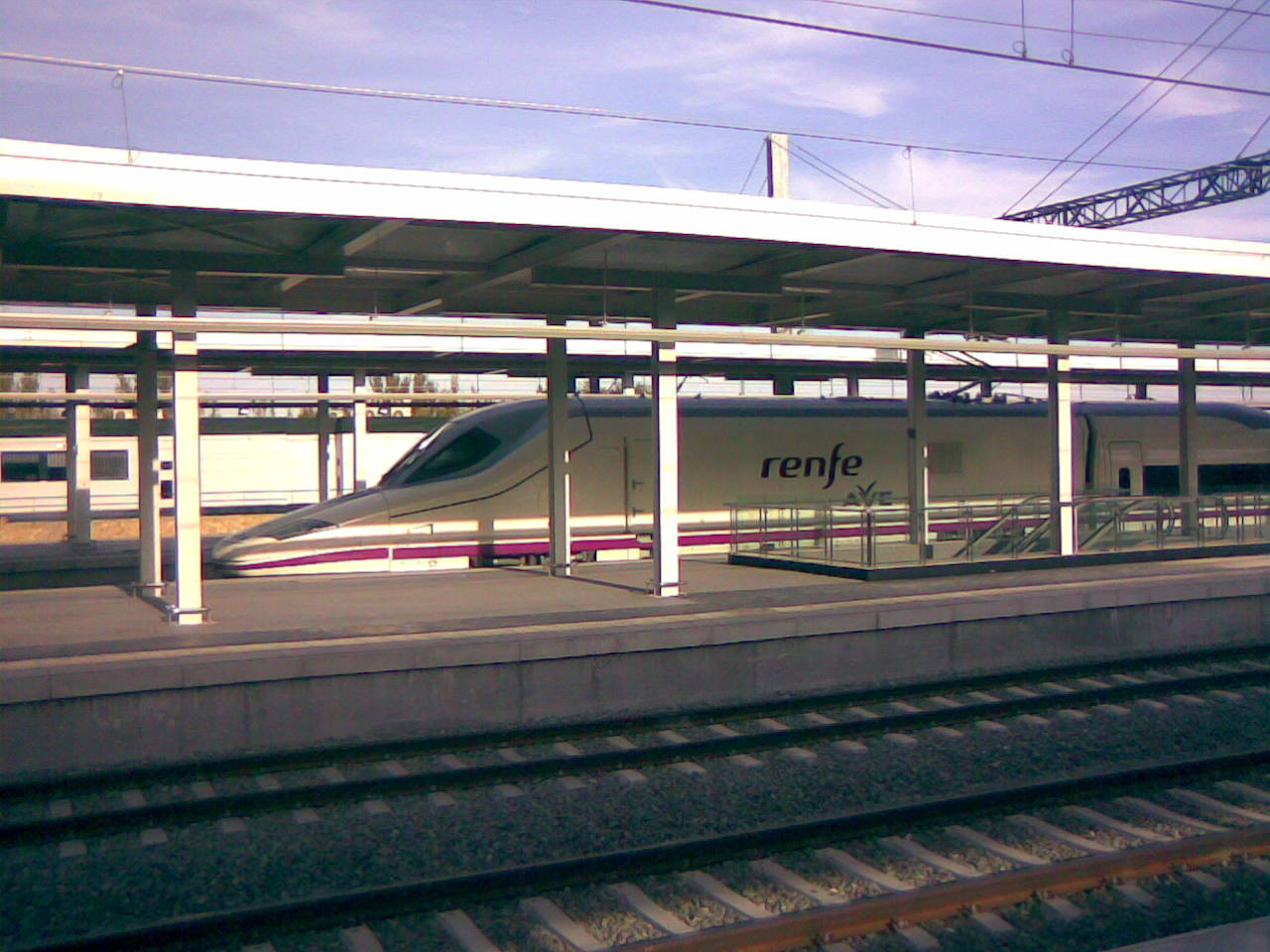
AVE in Albacete Station

=== Madrid-Atocha ===
Madrid Atocha (Spanish: Estación de Madrid Atocha, also named Madrid Puerta de Atocha) is the largest railway station in Madrid. Atocha also hosts commuter trains (Cercanías), intercity and regional trains from the south, and AVE high-speed trains to Barcelona (Catalonia) and Seville (Andalusia).

These services are run by the national rail company, Renfe. The station is in the Atocha neighbourhood of the Arganzuela district.

=== Cuenca-Fernando Zóbel ===
The Cuenca–Fernando Zóbel railway station is a new station, and is 5 km (3.1 mi) from the city centre. It is named after painter Fernando Zóbel to commemorate his links to the city. The station occupies 3.950 m^{2} with 8.900 m^{2} of parking space.

=== Albacete-Los Llanos ===
Albacete-Los Llanos railway station is 23,000 m^{2} (250,000 sq ft) with a commercial area and parking space for 600 cars.

=== Requena-Utiel ===
A new 600 m^{2} (6,500 sq ft) station called Requena-Utiel was built with parking space for at least 250 cars. It brings the two small towns of Requena and Utiel on to the high-speed map./

=== Valencia Central Station ===
A new Valencia Central Station will be built that eventually replaces the existing Valencia North station. It will be 12 tracks wide in 2 subterranean levels.

=== Villena AV ===
Located 6.5 km (4.0 mi) from Villena town centre.

=== Alicante ===
Current terminus of the Alicante branch at the existing Alicante railway station.

=== Elche AV ===
A 5,500 m^{2} (59,000 sq ft) station was planned for opening at the end of 2019, with parking space for 500 cars and 50 motorcycles. This was subsequently delayed until 2021.

=== Orihuela ===
The existing railway station at Orihuela is served by the AVE line.

== Future expansion ==
The network is under construction to expand to Cartagena and to be connected to Almería in the Mediterranean Corridor by 2026.

=== Stations ===
==== Murcia ====
The new intermodal Murcia del Carmen railway station is currently under construction at a cost of 11 million euros and will be close to the present station. It will be 8 rail tracks wide with underground platforms while the old station building is planned to serve buses and local trains. The new station is expected to be finished by 2024.

==== Cartagena ====
The current Cartagena railway station, located next to the old town is planned to be expanded with three new tracks next to the old building in order to host high speed services. Construction of the high speed railway between Murcia and Cartagena was scheduled since 2018 and planned to be complete by 2023 along with the new station, but still remain unfinished. The last 750m of the high speed track accessing the new station is going to be underground.

== See also ==
- AVE Spanish high-speed train service
