= Euromed (train) =

High speed rail connection in Spain

Euromed is a high-speed rail service operated by Renfe along the Spanish Mediterranean coast.

== Service ==
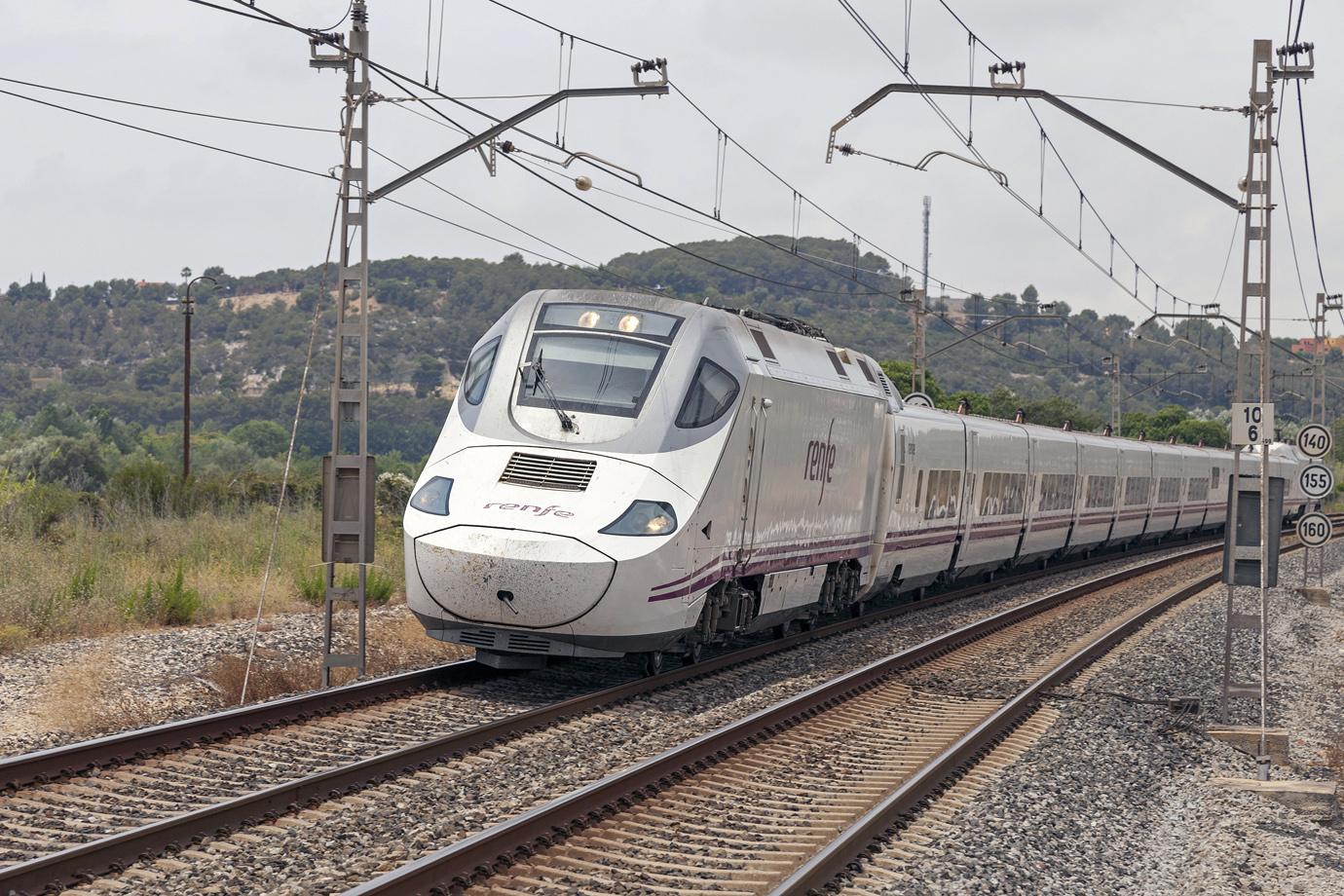
A current Class 130 trainset that is also used for the Euromed services

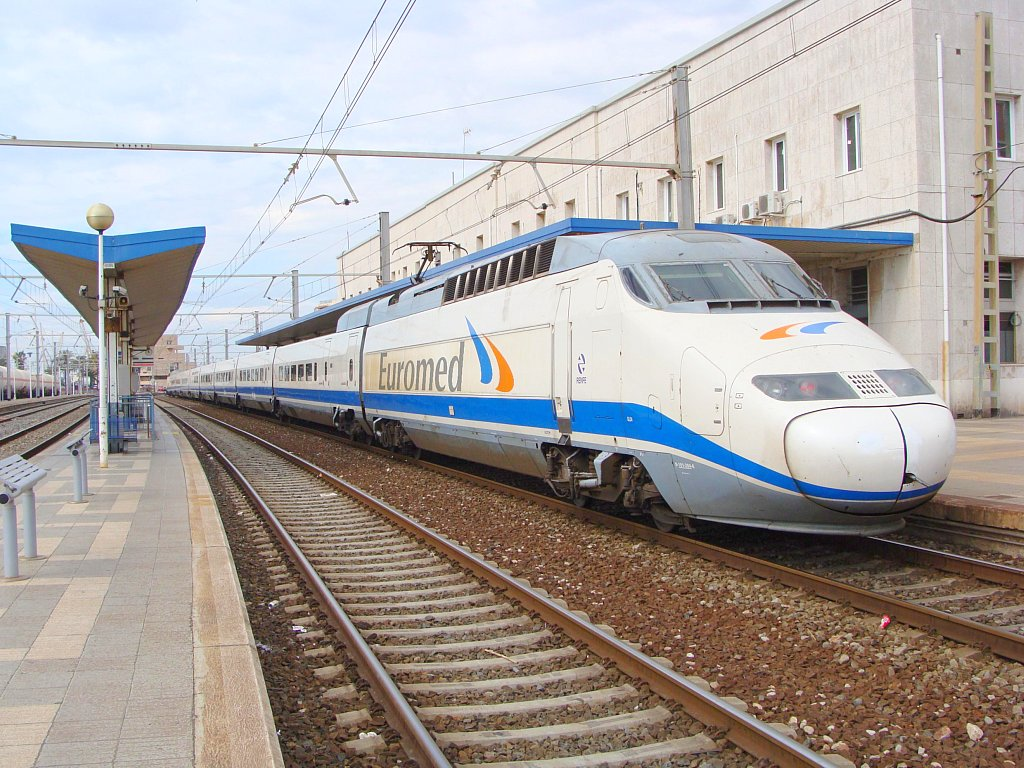
A former Class 101 Euromed trainset

Euromed entered commercial service on June 16, 1997, along a 523.4 km (325.2 mi) Mediterranean corridor, between the cities of Barcelona, Tarragona, Castellón de la Plana, Valencia and Alicante. Since January 2020 the Euromed service connects the city of Barcelona to the city of Valencia in 2 hours and 35 minutes and Barcelona to Alicante in 4 hours and 20 minutes while some services are extended to Girona and Figueres.

Figueres–Vilafant railway station
Girona railway station
Barcelona Sants railway station
Camp de Tarragona railway station
Castellón de la Plana railway station
Valencia-Joaquín Sorolla railway station
Alicante railway station

Euromed currently offers the following services:

- Barcelona–Valencia via Tarragona and Castellón.
- Barcelona–Alicante via Tarragona, Castellón and Valencia.
- Figueres–Valencia via Girona, Barcelona, Tarragona and Castellón.
- Figueres–Alicante via Girona, Barcelona, Tarragona, Castellón and Valencia.

== Line ==
The line consists of Iberian-gauge track sections and standard-gauge high-speed track sections. The section between Vandellòs and Castellón is an upgraded line of the old Iberian-gauge Valencia–Sant Vicenç de Calders railway for speeds up to 220 km/h. The section between Camp de Tarragona and Vandellòs is since 2020 a new built Iberian-gauge track. The section Camp de Tarragona–Barcelona–Girona–Figueres is a standard-gauge high-speed track formed by parts of the Madrid–Barcelona high-speed rail line and the Perpignan–Barcelona high-speed rail line. Other sections are parts of the Madrid–Levante high-speed rail network. Further construction works between Valencia and Alicante for the increase of speed and connectivity are ongoing as of 2025 as not all sections are capable for 200 km/h and above.

== Rolling stock ==
The service started using series 101 EMU rolling stock with bogies adapted for use on the 1,668 mm (5 ft 5 21/32 in) Iberian gauge track. Traction current is supplied by overhead lines, at either 3,000 volts direct current, or 25,000 volts alternating current at 50 Hz. In normal commercial service these trains traveled at 200 km/h (120 mph) and had a top speed of 220 km/h (140 mph), although 250 km/h (160 mph) was reached during testing. The fleet of six units was built by the French multinational Alstom.

In 2020 all the TGV based rolling stock was converted to standard gauge in order to be used in other routes, and since January 2020 are replaced by the new dual-gauge RENFE Class 130 trainsets, capable of reaching speeds up to 250 km/h (160 mph) when running on standard gauge high-speed lines and 220 km/h (140 mph) on the Iberian gauge lines.

== Accidents and incidents ==
On 30 March 2002 a Euromed train traveling across points at 155 km/h (96 mph) collided with a local train in Tarragona that had just left Torredembarra station. The impact caused both trains to derail, two fatalities, and 90 injured.
