= Estació del Nord (Valencia) =

Train station in Valencia (Spain)

Coordinates: 39°28′01″N 0°22′38″W

Valencia-Estació del Nord
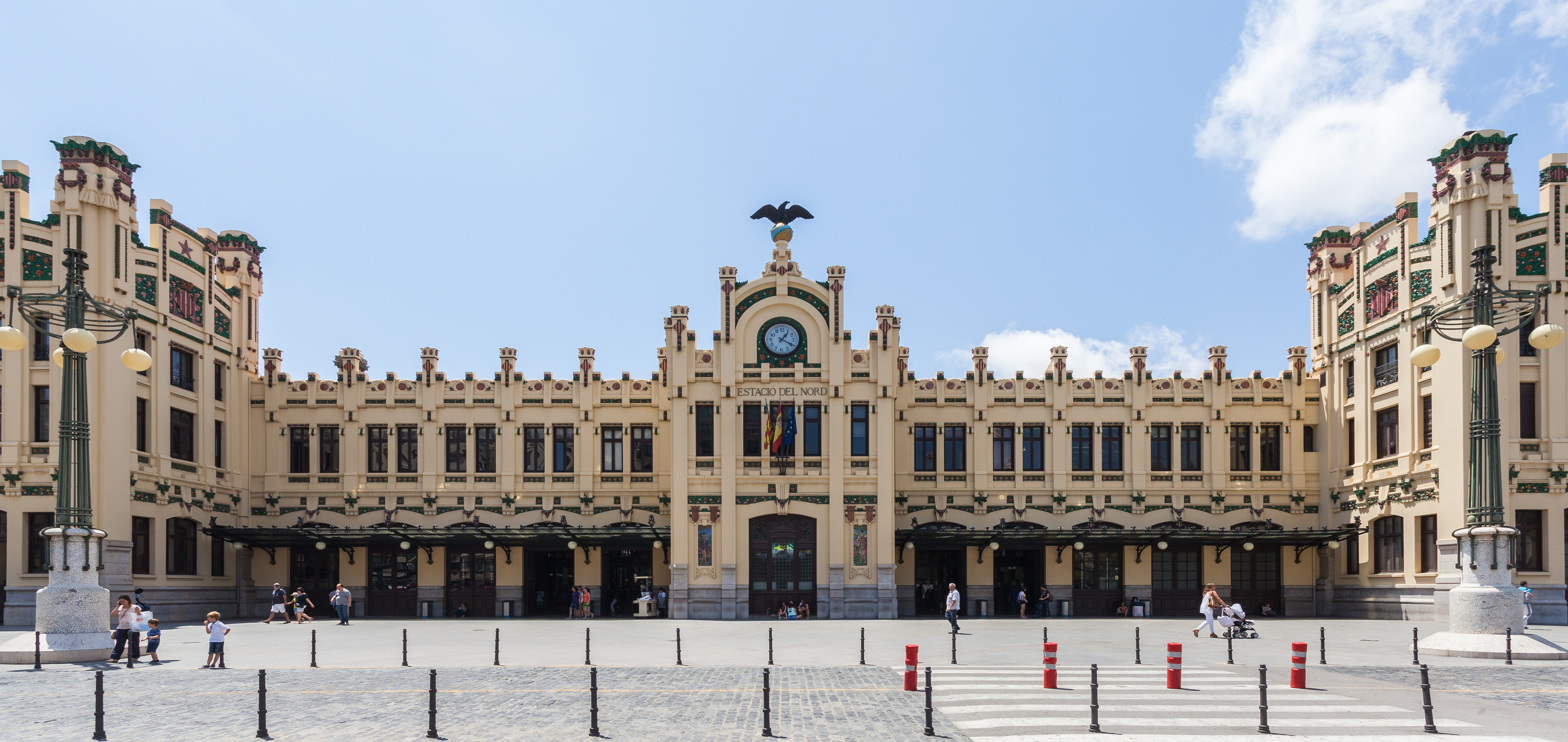
- Façade of the North Station

General information
- Location: Carrer de Xàtiva, 24, Extramurs, 46007 Valencia; Spain
- Lines: Madrid–Valencia (PK 463.7); Aranjuez–Cuenca–Valencia (PK 352.7); Valencia–Sant Vicenç de Calders (PK 0.0)
- Platforms: 6
- Tracks: 10
- Connections: Metrovalencia: at Xàtiva (C/ de Xàtiva) at Bailén (Carrer de Bailèn) at Plaça Espanya (Gran Vía de Ramón y Cajal) EMT

Construction
- Structure type: At-grade
- Parking: Yes
- Cycle facilities: Yes
- Architectural style: Valencian Art Nouveau

Other information
- Station code: 46.15.250-063

History
- Opened: 21 March 1852

Passengers
- 2018: 12 million
- Rank: 11
Location

The Estació del Nord (Valencian), (Note: Pronunciation in Valencian: [estasiˈo ðel ˈnɔɾt]) or Estación del Norte (Spanish), (Note: Pronunciation in Spanish: [estaˈθjon del ˈnoɾte]) both meaning "North Station", is the major railway station in Valencia, Spain. It is located in the city centre next to the Plaça de Bous or Plaza de Toros, the city's bullring, and 200 metres from the town hall.

The building is one of the main works of the Valencian Art Nouveau and was declared a Good of Cultural Heritage in 1987. It has connections with Metrovalencia and the city bus network.

AVE (high-speed) trains from Madrid and some other long-distance trains use Valencia-Joaquín Sorolla railway station, a short walk away, instead.

This station's name is a reference to Caminos de Hierro del Norte de España (Railways of the North of Spain), the railway company that constructed it and opened it in 1917, which was later nationalized and incorporated into Renfe, and later separated into Adif, the company that currently owns and runs it.

Dutch Symphonic Metal band Within Temptation performed at the station in July 2005 as a one-time event. The concert was filmed and broadcast on Spanish television.

== Services ==
Preceding station	Renfe Operadora	Following station
Sagunt towards Barcelona Sants	Intercity	Xàtiva towards Alicante
Sagunt towards Barcelona Sants	Intercity	Xàtiva towards Murcia del Carmen
Sagunt towards Barcelona Sants	Intercity	Xàtiva towards Cartagena
Sagunt towards Barcelona Sants	Intercity	Xàtiva towards Lorca-Sutullena
Castelló de la Plana towards Barcelona Sants	Intercity	Xàtiva towards Seville-Santa Justa
Castelló de la Plana towards Barcelona Sants	Intercity Torre del Oro	Xàtiva towards Cádiz
Terminus	Intercity	Alzira towards Madrid Chamartín
Valencia-Cabanyal towards Barcelona Sants	Intercity	Terminus
Valencia-Cabanyal towards Miraflores	Intercity	Xàtiva towards Cartagena
Terminus	Media Distancia 44	Xàtiva towards Cartagena
Terminus	Media Distancia 46	Xàtiva towards Alcázar de San Juan
Terminus	Media Distancia 47	Xàtiva towards Alcoy
València-Font de Sant Lluís towards Madrid Atocha	Media Distancia 48	Terminus
Terminus	Media Distancia 49	Valencia-Cabanyal towards Huesca
Terminus	Media Distancia 50	Valencia-Cabanyal towards Tortosa
Preceding station	Cercanías Valencia	Following station
Terminus	C-1	Alfafar-Benetússer towards Gandia or Platja i Grau de Gandia
Terminus	C-2	Alfafar-Benetússer towards Moixent
Terminus	C-3	Valencia-Sant Isidre towards Utiel
Terminus	C-5	Font Sant Lluís towards Caudiel
Terminus	C-6	Font Sant Lluís towards Castelló de la Plana
