= Valencia–Sant Vicenç de Calders railway =

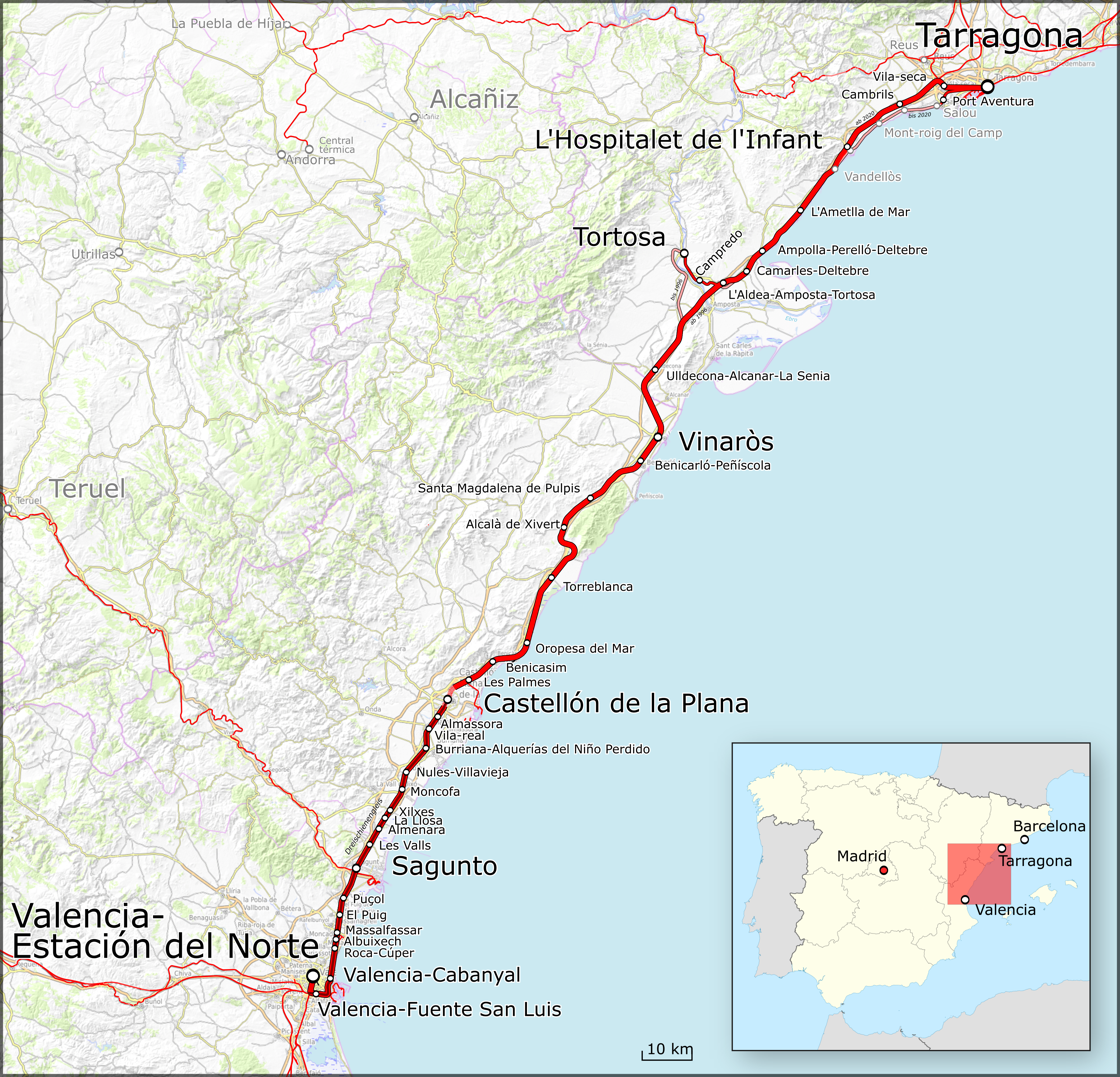
- Map of the Valencia–Sant Vicenç de Calders railway

Overview
- Status: Operational
- Owner: Adif
- Termini: Valencia Nord; Sant Vicenç de Calders station

Service
- Type: Higher-speed rail
- Operator: Renfe Operadora

History
- Opened: 1868

Technical
- Line length: 299.7 km (186.2 mi)
- Track gauge: 1,668 mm (5 ft 5 21/32 in) Iberian gauge

The Valencia–Sant Vicenç de Calders railway, also known as the Valencia–Tarragona railway, is a railway line in Spain, beginning at Valencia Nord and ending at Sant Vicenç de Calders.

== Route ==
The line links Valencia to Tarragona and onward to Barcelona, following the Mediterranean coast and serving major cities and towns along the coast including Sagunto, Castellón de la Plana, Tortosa and Tarragona. In January 2018, the Valencia–Castellón section was rebuilt with a third rail to dual gauge at a cost of €355 million, allowing standard gauge AVE high-speed rail services to run from Castellón to Madrid via Valencia. A new built 46·5 km cut-off section between Camp de Tarragona and Vandellòs bypassing the last remaining section of single track on the Mediterranean corridor west of Tarragona, started commercial services on January 13, 2020. The new section leads to a triangular junction with the Madrid–Barcelona high-speed rail line just west of Camp de Tarragona station.

== Services ==
Along with aforementioned AVE services, the high speed Euromed service connects the city of Barcelona to the city of Valencia in 2 hours and 35 minutes, running at speeds up to 220 km/h. Some services continue to Alicante in Valencian Community and to Figueres in Catalonia. Regional and Intercity Barcelona–Valencia services also operate in the line. In addition Cercanías Valencia commuter rail services operate to Castellón and Rodalies de Catalunya regional services operate in Catalonia. A high speed medium distance Avant service from Tortosa to Barcelona-Sants, calling at L'Aldea, L'Hospitalet de l'Infant, Cambrils and Camp de Tarragona was introduced in February 2020.
