= Lorca-Sutullena railway station =

Railway station in Lorca, Spain

Coordinates: 37°40′19″N 1°41′46″W

Lorca-Sutullena
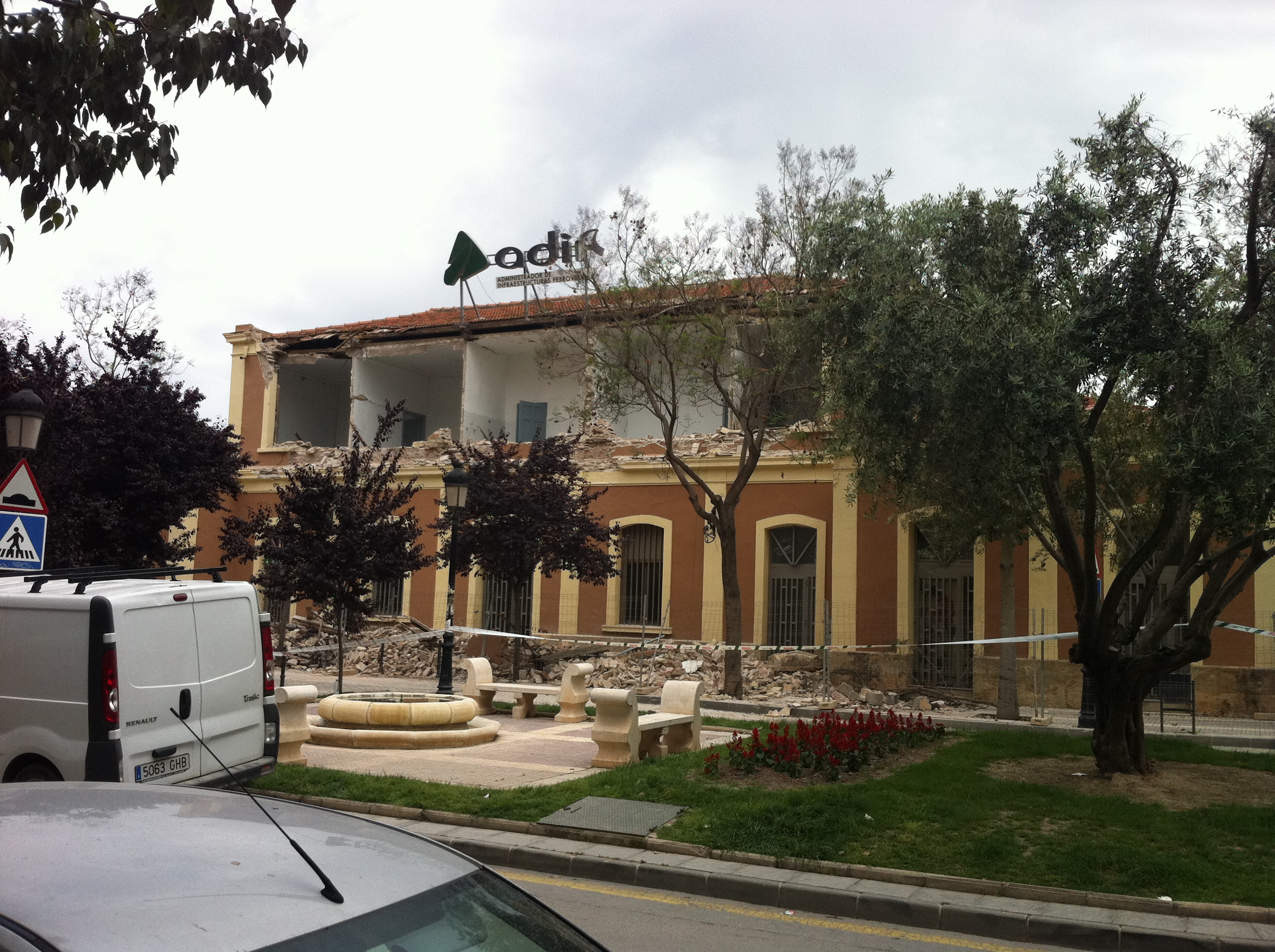
- The station damaged after the 2011 earthquake

General information
- Owner: Adif
- Operator: Renfe
Location

Lorca-Sutullena railway station is a station in Lorca, Spain. It was damaged in the 2011 Lorca earthquake.

It is primarily served by Cercanías Murcia/Alicante line C-2.

== Services ==
Preceding station	Renfe Operadora	Following station
Totana towards Barcelona Sants	Intercity	Terminus
Totana towards Madrid Chamartín	Intercity	Águilas Terminus
Totana towards Alicante	Media Distancia 43	Terminus
Preceding station	Cercanías Murcia/Alicante	Following station
Puerto Lumbreras towards Águilas	C-2	Lorca-San Diego towards Murcia del Carmen
