= Tortosa railway station =

Railway station in Spain

Tortosa
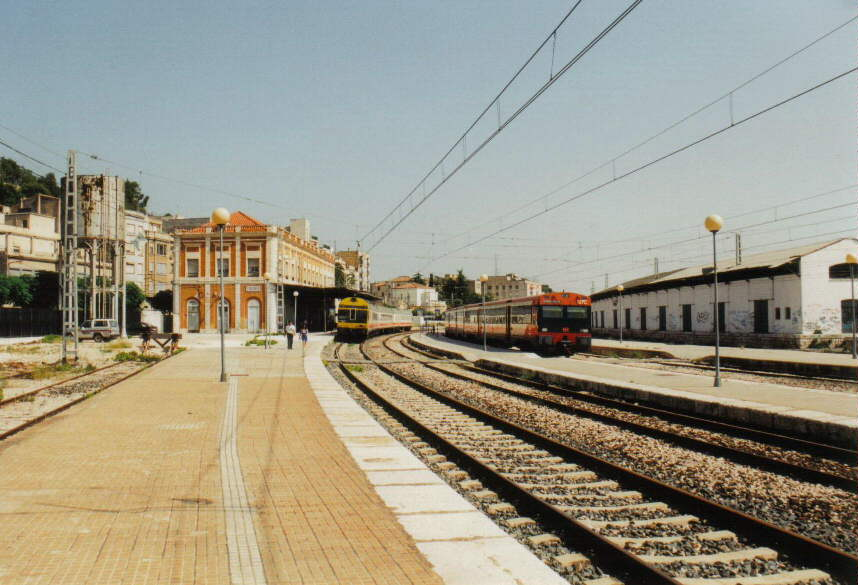
- Platforms of the station in 2001.

General information
- Owner: Adif
- Operator: Renfe
- Line: L'Aldea-Amposta-Tortosa railway

History
- Opened: 1865
Location

Tortosa railway station is the central railway station of Tortosa, Spain. The station is part of Adif and it accommodates Renfe Avant high-speed and Rodalies de Catalunya medium-distance trains.

Preceding station	Renfe Operadora	Following station
Terminus	Avant	L'Hospitalet de l'Infant towards Barcelona Sants
Terminus	Media Distancia 50	L'Aldea-Amposta-Tortosa towards Valencia Nord
Preceding station	Rodalies de Catalunya	Following station
Ulldecona-Alcanar-La Sénia Terminus	R16	L'Aldea-Amposta-Tortosa towards Barcelona Estació de França
Terminus	R16	Camp-redó towards Barcelona Estació de França
