= Alicante railway station =

Railway station in Alicante, Spain

Alacant Terminal
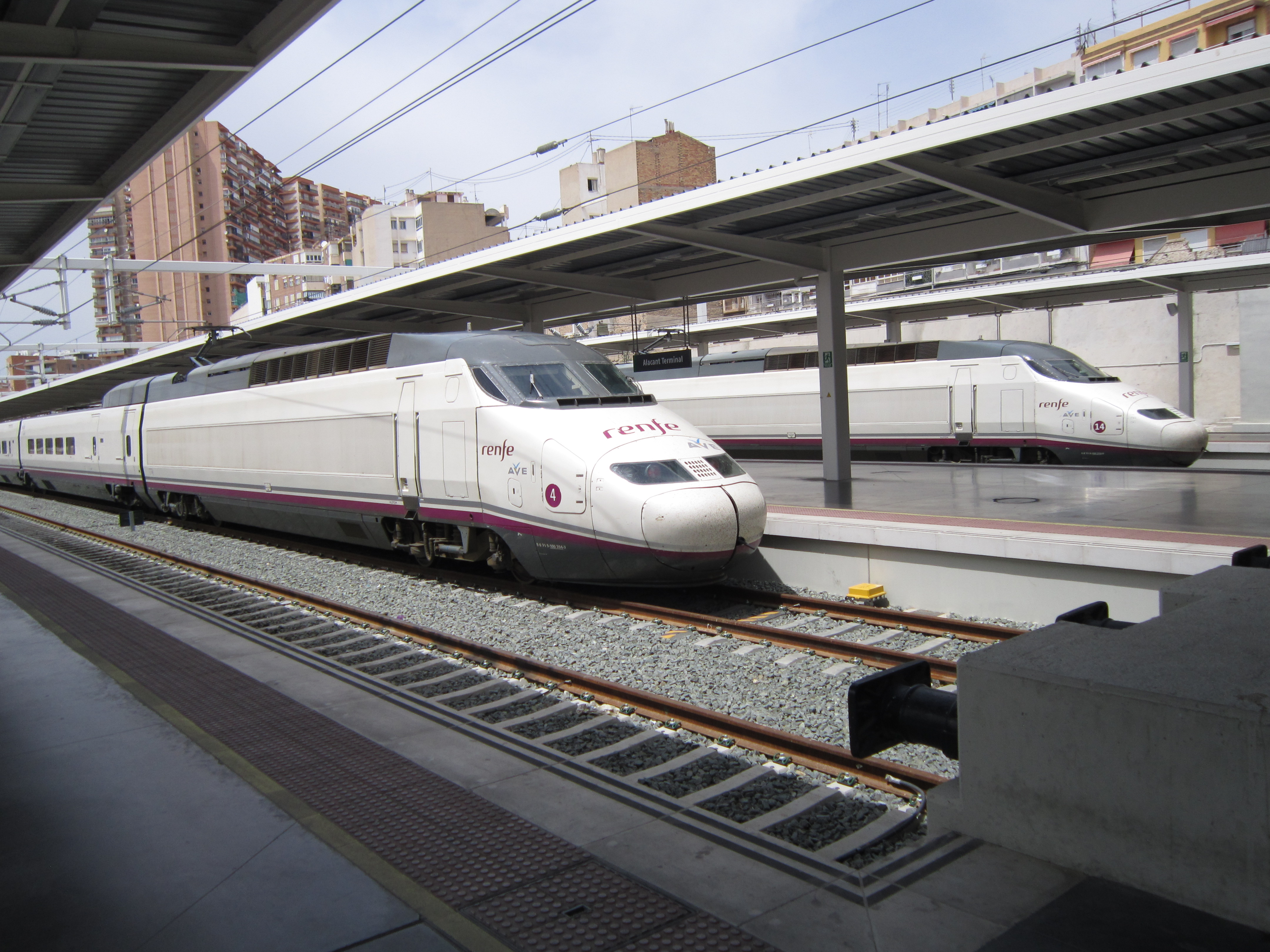
- Two AVE Class 100 trains at the Alicante terminal.

General information
- Location: Avenida de Salamanca, Alicante; Spain
- Coordinates: 38°20′40″N 0°29′41.9″W
- Owner: adif
- Lines: Alaris, Altaria, Alvia, Euromed, Talgo; L-1, L-2 (Valencia, Cartagena, Ciudad Real), (Murcia, San Vicente del Raspeig)

History
- Opened: 1858

Passengers
- 2018: 3,817,535

Services
Preceding station	Ouigo España	Following station
Albacete-Los Llanos towards Madrid Chamartín	Madrid to Alicante	Terminus
Location

Alicante Terminal (Valencian: Alacant Terminal) is the central railway station of Alicante, Spain. Commonly referred locally as the Renfe station, the station is part of Adif system, and is a terminal station.

The station accommodates RENFE long-distance and medium-distance trains, and it is the origin of lines C-1 and C-3 of Cercanías Murcia/Alicante (suburban trains). The station is not related to the narrow gauge railway Alicante-Dénia managed by FGV and part of the city's tram network.

In 2013, AVE (high-speed) railway reached Alicante. While a new intermodal station is to be constructed in place of the current terminal, a temporal terminal is to be utilized by the high speed trains.

== History ==
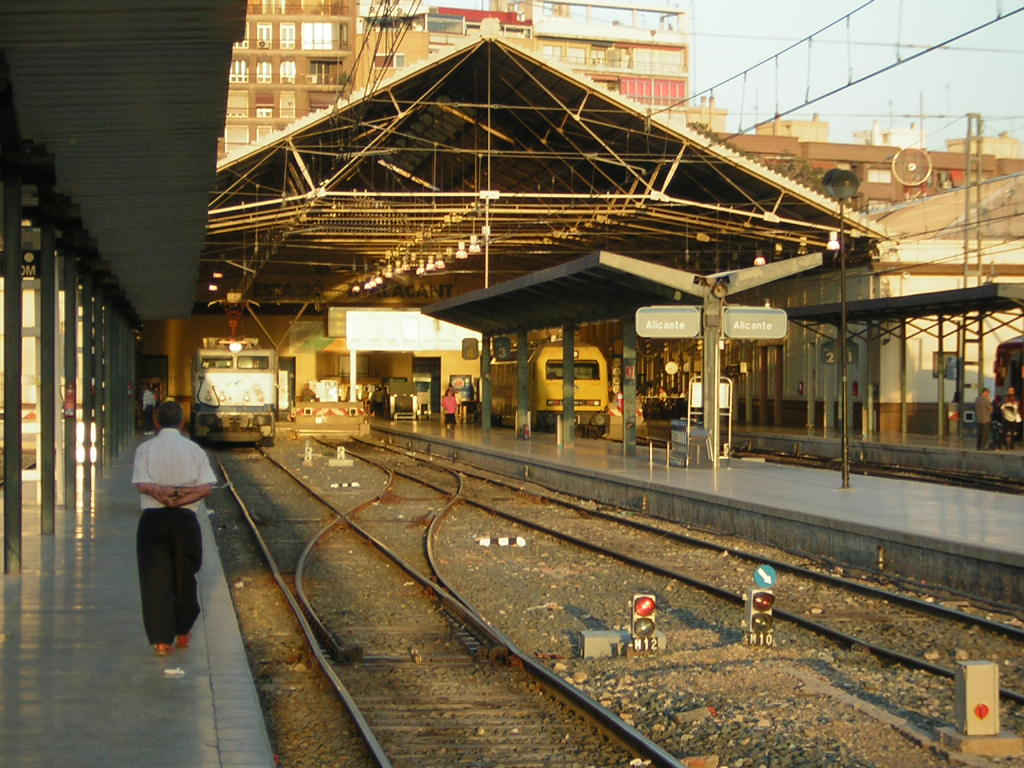
Alicante Terminal in 2005

The first train to Alicante arrived from Madrid on 4 January 1858. It took almost 10 years to construct a railway from Madrid to Alicante, which was carried out by Compañía de los Ferrocarriles de Madrid a Zaragoza y Alicante, a predecessor of Renfe. Passenger services began on 1 March 1858, but the official opening awaited the arrival of Queen Isabella II on 25 May 1858.

The initial design of the stations along the Almansa-Alicante part of the railway was approved in 1853. Additional extensions to the projects were made in 1857. It was one of the largest terminals built in Spain in those years.

Between 1967 and 1968 the original facade of the Alicante station was completely rebuilt.

== Services ==
- The station services Alicante and Murcia suburban areas with a frequency of 1 or 2 trains per hour on line C-1 and with eight trains per day on line C-3. The station is the origin for both lines and is located in tariff area 6 of the Cercanías Murcia/Alicante network.
- The station is used by medium-distance RENFE trains such as Regional Express or Regional with services to Valencia, Murcia, Cartagena, Albacete, Villarrobledo, and Ciudad Real as lines L-1 and L-2.
- Barcelona and Madrid are the primary destinations of long-distance trains operated by Renfe. With the completion of high-speed railway (AVE), a trip from Madrid to Alicante now takes between 2h20 mins and 2h40 mins.

Preceding station	Renfe Operadora	Following station
Albacete-Los Llanos towards Madrid Puerta de Atocha	AVE	Orihuela-Miguel Hernández towards Murcia del Carmen
Villena AV towards Madrid Chamartín	AVE	Terminus
Albacete-Los Llanos towards León	AVE	Terminus
Villena AV towards Madrid Chamartín	Avlo	Terminus
Albacete-Los Llanos towards Ourense-Empalme	AVE	Terminus
Villena AV towards Madrid Chamartín	Avlo	Elche AV towards Murcia del Carmen
Villena AV towards A Coruña	Alvia	Terminus
Villena AV towards Gijón	Alvia	Terminus
Villena AV towards Pontevedra	Alvia	Terminus
Villena AV towards Santander	Alvia	Terminus
Valencia-Joaquín Sorolla towards Barcelona Sants	Euromed	Terminus
Elda-Petrer towards Barcelona Sants	Intercity	Elche-Parque towards Murcia del Carmen
Elda-Petrer towards Barcelona Sants	Intercity	Elche-Parque towards Cartagena
Elda-Petrer towards Barcelona Sants	Intercity	Elche-Parque towards Lorca-Sutullena
Elda-Petrer towards Barcelona Sants	Intercity	Terminus
Novelda towards Miraflores	Intercity	Sant Gabriel towards Cartagena
Terminus	Media Distancia 43	Sant Gabriel towards Lorca-Sutullena
Novelda-Aspe towards Valencia Nord	Media Distancia 44	Sant Gabriel towards Cartagena
Elda-Petrer towards Ciudad Real	Media Distancia 45	Terminus
Elda-Petrer towards Jaén	Media Distancia 61	Terminus
Preceding station	Cercanías Murcia/Alicante	Following station
San Gabriel towards Murcia del Carmen	C-1	Terminus
Terminus	C-3	Universidad de Alicante towards San Vicente Centro
