= Cartagena railway station =

Railway station in the Region of Murcia, Spain

Cartagena
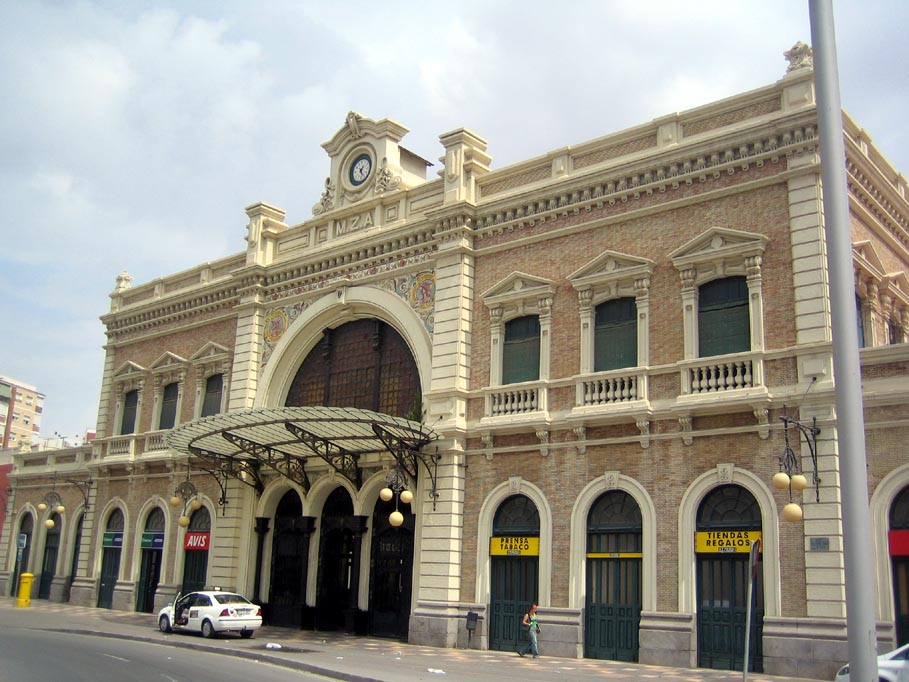
- Station building

General information
- Coordinates: 37.6048°N 0.974801°W
- Owner: Adif
- Operator: Renfe
- Line: Chinchilla–Cartagena
- Platforms: 3

Passengers
- 2018: 213,773
Location

Cartagena railway station is a railway terminal station located in the Spanish municipality of Cartagena, in the region of Murcia. It has medium- and long-distance services operated by Renfe. The Art Nouveau building was built between 1903, when the foundation work began, and 1908, when the central or main building was finished. The design of the building was the joint work of architect Emilio Antón Hernández along with engineers José Cebada Ruiz and José Moreno Rodríguez, all of them being directed and supervised by the engineer Ramón Peironcely.

== Network ==
The facilities are located at kilometre point 524.6 of the Iberian gauge Chinchilla–Cartagena line, at 5 m. above sea level. The high mileage is due to the fact that Madrid, rather than Chinchilla, is read as the start point of the line.

== Services ==
Cartagena is served by Media Distancia trains to Valencia-Nord and Altaria services to Madrid, all via Murcia del Carmen. There is a daily direct train to Barcelona via Murcia, Alicante and Valencia.

== History ==
The railway arrived in Cartagena courtesy of the Railway Company from Madrid to Zaragoza and Alicante Railway Company (M.Z.A.) on 24 October 1862, when Queen Elizabeth II made a maiden voyage between Cartagena and Murcia. Nevertheless, the railway did not commence operation until 1 February 1863, inaugurating a route that was intended to link Albacete with the Madrid-Alicante line.

The construction of the station was delayed due to problems related to the then Ministry of War, which considered the construction a threat to the defensive walls. The Cartagena Expansion and Sanitation Project of 1897 included in its development the final location of the station, which facilitated the start of its construction; this did not take place until the War Ministry disarmed the wall as a defensive element of the city. From 1896 began the Levelling and filling work in the site began in 1896 and the building foundations were dug in 1903. First the side pavilions were built, allowing passenger traffic to move to the new station in July, 1906, using the northern side pavilion.

During the period 1907–08 the central building was erected. The design of the building was the joint work of architect Emilio Antón Hernández along with engineers José Cebada Ruiz and José Moreno Rodríguez, all of them directed and supervised by the engineer Ramón Peironcely Elosegui. The ceramicist Daniel Zuloaga stands out among the most important suppliers who worked at the station; he, under the supervision of engineer José Cebada, was responsible for the design and construction of the modernist tiling of the main façade.

Since 1941, when the entire Spanish railway network was nationalised, the station has been managed by RENFE. Since 31 December 2004 Renfe Operadora has operated the line while Adif is the operator of the railway facilities.

In 2018, the Alvia 730 service began, enabling travel times between Cartagena to Madrid of three hours and thirty-two minutes.

Approximately 250 m (820 ft) southwest of the station is the terminus of the Cartagena–Los Nietos commuter rail line.

Preceding station	Renfe Operadora	Following station
Torre Pacheco towards Madrid Puerta de Atocha	Alvia	Terminus
Torre Pacheco towards Madrid Chamartín	Intercity	Terminus
Torre Pacheco towards Barcelona Sants	Intercity	Terminus
Torre Pacheco towards Miraflores	Intercity	Terminus
Torre Pacheco towards Valencia Nord	Media Distancia 44	Terminus

== Future ==
Work began in 2018 to prepare Cartagena station as the future terminus of the Madrid–Levante high-speed rail network, due to reach the station in 2023.
