= Murcia del Carmen railway station =

Murcia del Carmen
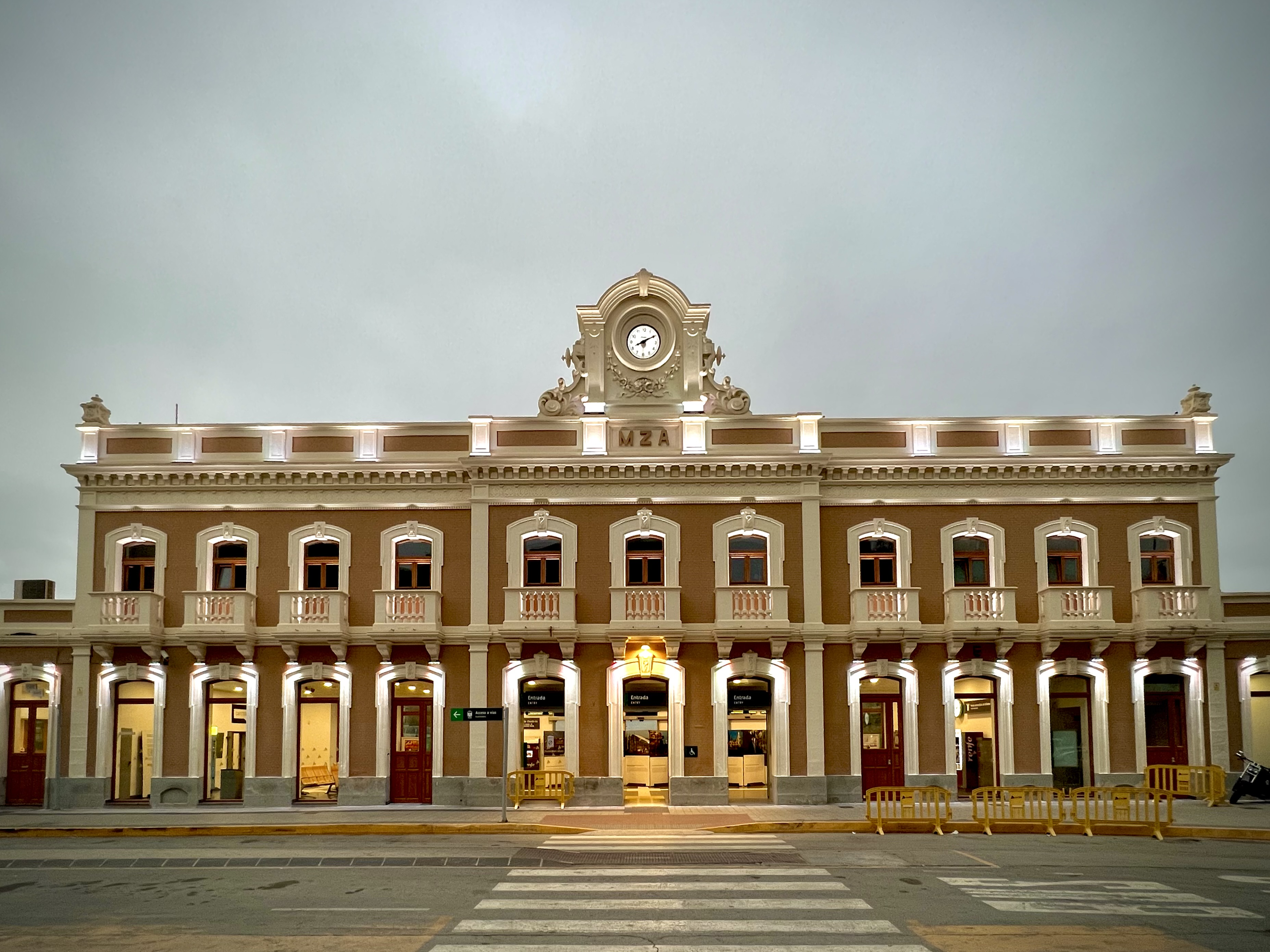
- The station exterior, built in 1863

General information
- Coordinates: 37.9748°N 1.1315°W
- Owner: Adif
- Operator: Renfe
- Line: Chinchilla–Cartagena
- Platforms: 2

Passengers
- 2018: 1,788,607
Location

Murcia del Carmen railway station is the main railway station in the Spanish city of Murcia.

== Services ==
The Cercanías Murcia/Alicante commuter rail network connects Murcia del Carmen with Alicante railway station and Águilas through lines C-1 and C-2. AVE and Avlo high speed services use the Madrid–Levante high-speed rail network to connect Murcia to Madrid. Talgo services also operate to Valencia Nord and Barcelona Sants.

Preceding station	Renfe Operadora	Following station
Orihuela-Miguel Hernández towards Madrid Puerta de Atocha	AVE	Terminus
Orihuela-Miguel Hernández towards Madrid Chamartín	AVE	Terminus
Orihuela-Miguel Hernández towards Madrid Chamartín	Avlo	Terminus
Archena-Fortuna towards Madrid Chamartín	Intercity	Balsicas-Mar Menor towards Cartagena
Orihuela-Miguel Hernández towards Barcelona Sants	Intercity	Terminus
Orihuela-Miguel Hernández towards Barcelona Sants	Intercity	Balsicas-Mar Menor towards Cartagena
Orihuela-Miguel Hernández towards Barcelona Sants	Intercity	Alhama de Murcia towards Lorca-Sutullena
Albacete-Los Llanos towards Madrid Chamartín	Intercity	Alhama de Murcia towards Águilas
Beniel towards Miraflores	Intercity	Balsicas-Mar Menor towards Cartagena
Orihuela-Miguel Hernández towards Alicante	Media Distancia 43	Librilla towards Lorca-Sutullena
Beniel towards Valencia Nord	Media Distancia 44	Balsicas-Mar Menor towards Cartagena
Preceding station	Cercanías Murcia/Alicante	Following station
Terminus	C-1	Beniel towards Alicante
Alcantarilla-Los Romanos towards Águilas	C-2	Terminus

== Future ==
Since 20 December 2022 the AVE high-speed rail system is serving Murcia via the Madrid–Levante high-speed rail network and construction works are ongoing for the Murcia–Almería high-speed rail line with extensive modifications for the train station in order platforms and track to be relocated underground. In October 2017, protesters against the underground alignment blocked the track leading to the station, leading to multiple train cancellations. The new station is expected to be finished by 2024 at a cost of 11 million euros.
