= Avlo =

Low-cost high-speed rail service

- Franchise: Wholly owned subsidiary of Renfe
- Main stations: Madrid Atocha, Barcelona Sants
- Other station: Zaragoza–Delicias
- Fleet: 5 S-112; 10 S-106
- Stations called at: 44
- Parent company: Renfe

Other
- Website: avlorenfe.com
Route map
Current and planned services

Avlo (Spanish pronunciation: ['aβlo], short for Alta Velocidad Low Cost, lit. 'No Frills High Speed') is a low-cost high-speed rail service operated by Spanish national rail company Renfe, offering services connecting major Spanish cities such as Madrid, Zaragoza, Barcelona, Valencia, Alicante and others on specific high-speed lines.

== History ==
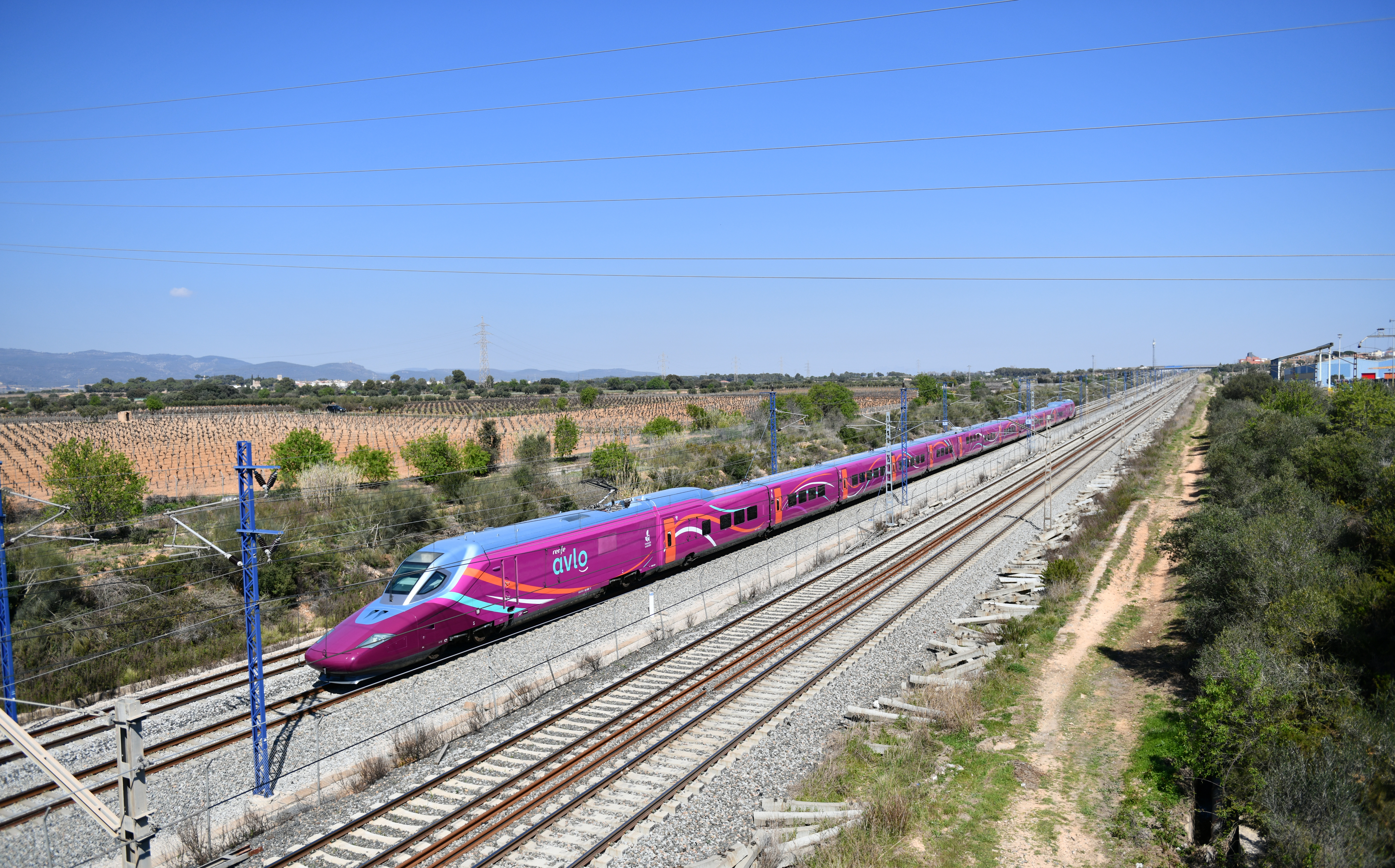
The AVLO services are operated by rebuilt and repainted class 112 trains. Here a test train in March 2021 near Alt Penedès (Catalonia)

Based on the popularity of the French low-cost high-speed rail service Ouigo that was introduced in 2013 by French national rail company SNCF, and keen to encourage train travel on the Spanish high-speed rail network, Renfe was interested in setting up their own such budget service. The service was announced on 6 February 2018 by the then Minister of Public Works Íñigo de la Serna. It was provisionally named "eva", the name of the Renfe's own high-speed train service, AVE, spelt backwards and was aimed to be operational by the first quarter of 2019.

The original plan was for trains to run between Madrid and less frequently used AVE stations in Catalonia, namely Camp de Tarragona and El Prat de Llobregat, the latter only around 10 km from Barcelona's Sants terminus. This concept resembles the strategy of Avlo's potential low-cost competitor Ouigo, which goes to Tourcoing rather than the larger station Lille Europe.

However, after a series of delays and with the prospect of new competitors operating as of late 2020, such as the airline Air Nostrum, the Italian rail company Trenitalia, and Ouigo, a subsidiary of French rail company SNCF, Renfe felt obliged to revive the plans for a low-cost rail service of their own. Renfe went back to the drawing board and new sets of proposals for the service were announced on 11 December 2019, with services planned to begin on 6 April 2020 during the 2020 Easter holidays. Avlo was set to run between the Madrid Atocha, Zaragoza–Delicias and Barcelona Sants stations. In contrast with earlier plans, the service was to stop in Zaragoza rather than Tarragona.

On 15 March 2020, Renfe announced that the launch of the service would be postponed until further notice on account of the COVID-19 pandemic. Customers who had paid a promotional fare of €5 were given the option to travel at a later date, while non-promotional tickets were refunded in full.

Avlo services between Madrid, Barcelona and Figueres on the French border commenced on 23 June 2021. Three daily services in each direction used to run between Madrid and Barcelona, while a fourth service made stops in Guadalajara, Calatayud, Saragossa, Lleida, Tarragona, Barcelona, Girona and terminated in Figueres. As in the previous attempt to launch this service, promotional ticket prices started at €5. Six return services between Madrid and Valencia commenced on 21 February 2022. Since 28 March 2023, four daily services between Madrid and Alicante are offered and since 1 June 2023 Avlo connects Madrid to Andalusia by offering four daily services, two on the Seville-Madrid connection and two on the Málaga–Madrid connection. Since 10 December 2023 Renfe included a new daily service to Murcia via Alicante stopping in all intermediate stations. On 22 July 2024 additional services to the regions of Asturias and Galicia introduced connecting Madrid to Gijón, A Coruña and Vigo on S-106 trains.

Since 8 September 2025 all Avlo services between Madrid and Barcelona were replaced by AVE services, while all Avlo S-106 trains are withdrawn from that corridor.

== Services ==
As of 2025 Renfe offers the following Avlo services:

- Madrid Atocha–Málaga via Ciudad Real, Puertollano, Villanueva De Córdoba, Córdoba, Puente Genil-Herrera and Antequera.
- Madrid Atocha–Seville via Ciudad Real, Puertollano, Villanueva De Córdoba and Córdoba.
- Madrid Chamartín–Valencia via Cuenca and Requena-Utiel.
- Madrid Chamartín–Alicante via Cuenca, Albacete and Villena.
- Madrid Chamartín–Murcia via Cuenca, Albacete, Villena, Alicante, Elche and Orihuela.
- Madrid Chamartín–Gijón via Valladolid, Palencia, León, La Pola, Mieres Del Camín and Oviedo.
- Madrid Chamartín–A Coruña, via Segovia, Medina Del Campo, Zamora, Sanabria, A Gudiña, Ourense and Santiago de Compostela.
- Madrid Chamartín–Vigo via Segovia, Medina Del Campo, Zamora, Sanabria, A Gudiña, Ourense, Santiago De Compostela, Vilagarcía de Arousa and Pontevedra.
- Murcia–Valladolid via Orihuela, Elche, Alicante, Villena, Albacete, Cuenca and Madrid Chamartín. (one way schedule)
- Valladolid–Alicante via Madrid Chamartín, Cuenca, Albacete and Villena. (return schedule departs from Murcia)

== Rolling stock and pricing ==
The Avlo service consists of modified purple-coloured Talgo AVE trains. They are using S-112 trains upgraded to 438 seats, while S-106 trains are used for the Madrid–València, Madrid–Alicante, Madrid–Gijón, Madrid–A Coruña, Madrid–Vigo and Murcia–Madrid–Valladolid services with capacity varying from 507 to 581 seats, both in all-second class configuration. In the past those trains were also used for the now discontinued Madrid–Barcelona Avlo services. Renfe has reported it is pricing tickets of the Avlo as low as €10 and €7 for the promotion of the new S-106 trains, compared to the lowest offer of €48 for the normal AVE ticket for Madrid and Barcelona.

== See also ==
- High-speed rail in Spain
- Ouigo España – a competitor service by SNCF
- Iryo – a competitor service by Trenitalia/Air Nostrum
- IZY – a low-cost high-speed rail service between Paris and Brussels
