= Calatayud railway station =

Railway station in Aragon, Spain

Calatayud
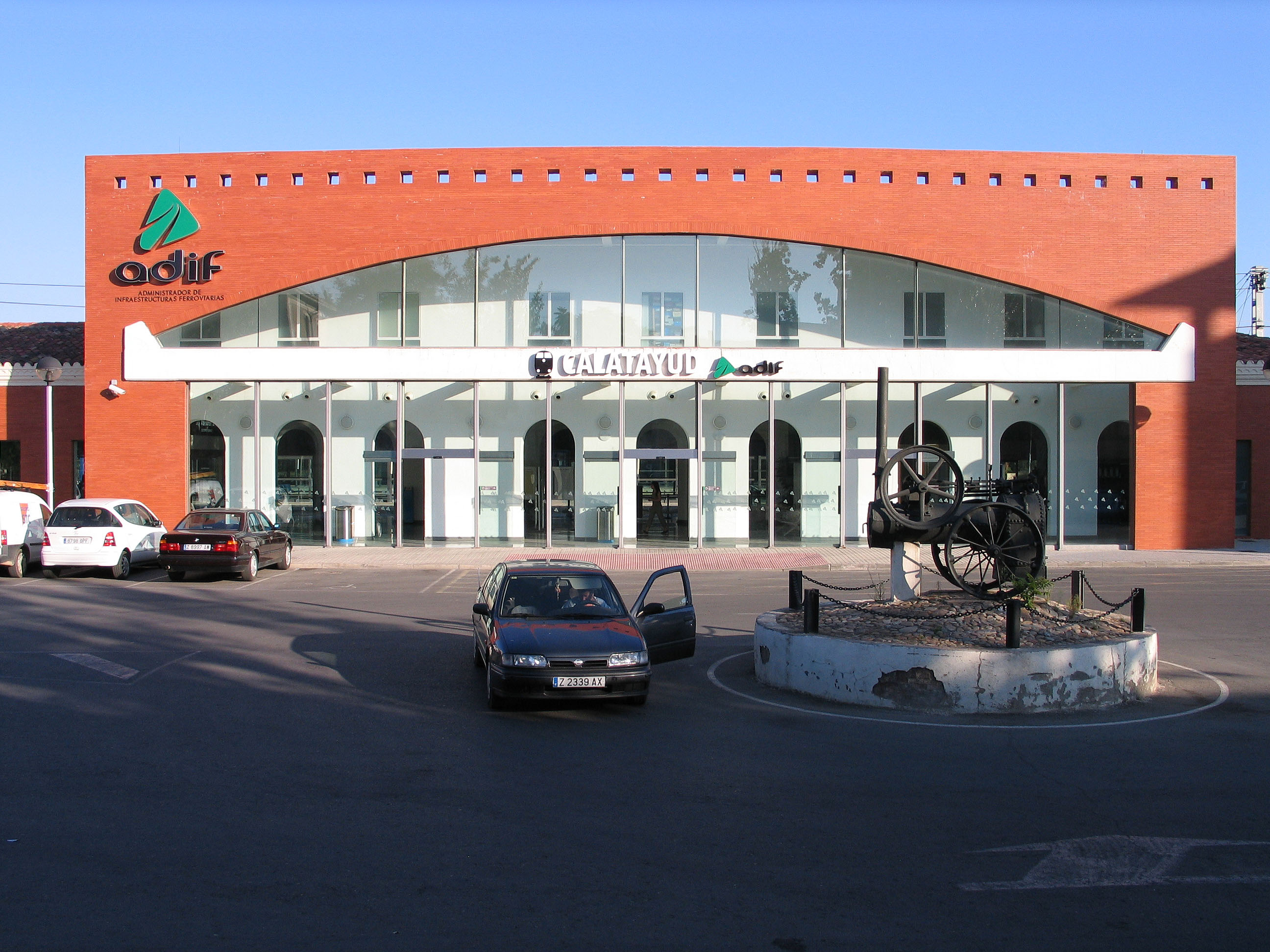
- The facade of Calatayud station in 2008

General information
- Location: Calatayud, Aragon; Spain
- Coordinates: 41°20′48″N 1°38′18″W
- Operator: Renfe
- Line: Madrid–Barcelona railway

Passengers
- 2018: 238,525
Location

Calatayud station is a railway station located in the Spanish city of Calatayud in Aragon. It brings together the classic Iberian gauge route between Madrid and Barcelona and the new high speed line. For the arrival of the latter, it was decided to remodel the old station known as Calatayud-Jalon. It is served by the AVE high speed trains between Madrid and Barcelona and onwards to Figueres.

== Services ==
Preceding station	Renfe Operadora	Following station
Terminus	Avant	Zaragoza–Delicias Terminus
Guadalajara–Yebes towards Madrid Puerta de Atocha	AVE	Zaragoza–Delicias towards Barcelona Sants
Guadalajara–Yebes towards Madrid Puerta de Atocha	AVE	Zaragoza–Delicias towards Figueres-Vilafant
Guadalajara–Yebes towards Madrid Puerta de Atocha	AVE	Zaragoza–Delicias towards Huesca
Guadalajara–Yebes towards Madrid Puerta de Atocha	Avlo	Zaragoza–Delicias towards Figueres–Vilafant
Guadalajara–Yebes towards Madrid Puerta de Atocha	Alvia	Tudela de Navarra towards Pamplona
Guadalajara–Yebes towards Madrid Puerta de Atocha	Alvia	Tudela de Navarra towards Logroño
