= Guadalajara–Yebes railway station =

Railway station

Guadalajara–Yebes
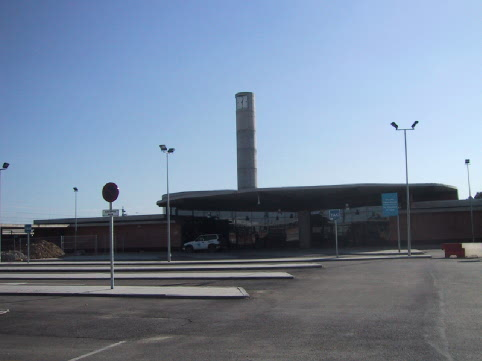

General information
- Coordinates: 40°35′15″N 3°7′30″W
- Owner: Adif
- Operator: Renfe
- Line: Madrid–Barcelona high-speed rail line

Passengers
- 2018: 85,094

Services
Preceding station	Renfe Operadora	Following station
Madrid Atocha Terminus	AVE	Zaragoza–Delicias towards Marseille-St-Charles
Location

Guadalajara–Yebes railway station (Spanish: Estación de Guadalajara–Yebes) (IATA: GDU) is a railway station near Guadalajara, Spain, on the Madrid–Barcelona high-speed rail line. A commercial service began in 2003 when the section between Madrid and Zaragoza opened.

Guadalajara has another station on the conventional line called Guadalajara railway station, which offers a variety of routes including a commuter service to Madrid.

The station has attracted criticism as it cost €11 million to build, but was only used by 78,000 passengers in 2016.

== Services ==
Preceding station	Renfe Operadora	Following station
Madrid Puerta de Atocha Terminus	AVE	Calatayud towards Barcelona Sants
Madrid Puerta de Atocha Terminus	AVE	Calatayud towards Figueres–Vilafant
Madrid Puerta de Atocha Terminus	AVE	Calatayud towards Huesca
Madrid Puerta de Atocha Terminus	Avlo	Calatayud towards Figueres–Vilafant
Madrid Puerta de Atocha Terminus	Alvia	Calatayud towards Pamplona
Madrid Puerta de Atocha Terminus	Alvia	Calatayud towards Logroño
