= Tudela de Navarra railway station =

Railway station in Tudela, Spain

Tudela de Navarre
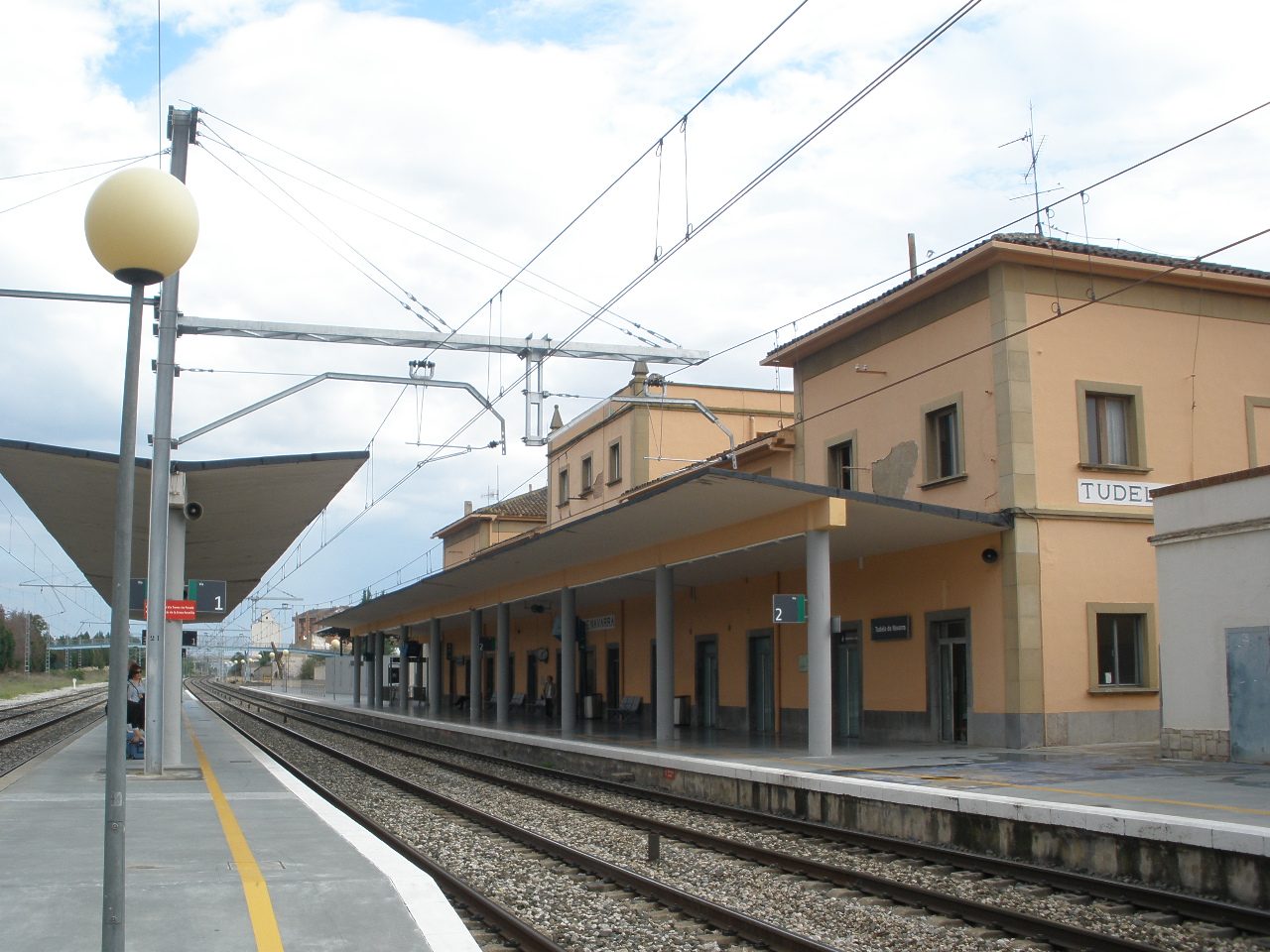

General information
- Location: Tudela; Spain
- Coordinates: 42.0593°N 1.5978°W
- Owner: adif
- Line: Casetas–Bilbao railway

History
- Opened: May 1861

Passengers
- 2018: 349,129
Location

Estación de Tudela de Navarra is a railway and bus station in the Spanish city of Tudela in the autonomous region of Navarre.

== History ==
It was first opened in May 1861.

Preceding station	Renfe Operadora	Following station
Alfaro towards Logroño	Alvia	Calatayud towards Madrid Puerta de Atocha
Castejón de Ebro towards Pamplona	Alvia	Calatayud towards Madrid Puerta de Atocha
Castejón de Ebro towards Bilbao-Abando	Alvia	Zaragoza-Delicias towards Barcelona Sants
Castejón de Ebro towards Hendaye	Alvia	Zaragoza-Delicias towards Barcelona Sants
Castejón de Ebro towards A Coruña	Alvia	Zaragoza-Delicias towards Barcelona Sants
Castejón de Ebro towards Vigo-Guixar	Alvia	Zaragoza-Delicias towards Barcelona Sants
Castejón de Ebro towards Gijón	Alvia	Zaragoza-Delicias towards Barcelona Sants
Castejón de Ebro towards Logroño	Media Distancia 22	Ribaforada towards Zaragoza-Delicias
Castejón de Ebro towards Vitoria-Gasteiz	Media Distancia 26	Ribaforada towards Zaragoza-Delicias
