= Compañía de los Caminos de Hierro del Norte de España =

1858–1941 Spanish railway company

- Abbreviation: CCHNE
- Predecessor: List: Zaragoza to Pamplona and Barcelona Railway Company; Tudela–Bilbao railway; Asturias, Galicia and León Railway Company; Almansa to Valencia and Tarragona Railway Company
- Successor: Red Nacional de los Ferrocarriles Españoles (National Network of Spanish Railways)
- Formation: December 29, 1858
- Dissolved: 1941
- Headquarters: Madrid, Spain
- Services: Rail transport

The Compañia de los Caminos de Hierro del Norte de España (CCHNE), known simply as Norte, was a Spanish railway company founded on December 29, 1858. Its network was one of the most extensive in Spain, until it was nationalized in 1941, and integrated into the Red Nacional de los Ferrocarriles Españoles (RENFE).

== History ==
=== Origins and founding ===
The origins of Norte lie on the construction of the Madrid-Hendaye railway, designed to link the Spanish capital with the French border. The history of this line can be divided into two parts:

- From 1845 to 1855; many projects were presented but did not materialize in any construction.
- In 1856 the construction of the railway line from Madrid to Irun, or the Northern Railway, finally began. This line would become the base for the northern network of Spain, with 633 kilometres. The construction of the line was finished eight years later, after which it was dedicated to its exploitation, managing to increase it with multiple annexations until 1941, when it was absorbed by the State.

People in Biscay were very interested in building a railway line that would connect them with the capital, since it was developing the ferrous metallurgy in the area and needed good transportation. Thus, in 1843 the blast furnaces of Santa Ana de Bolueta were inaugurated and a bit later the companies that were the origin of Altos Hornos de Vizcaya were also inaugurated.

On August 16, 1845, a provisional Royal Order was approved, granting the representatives of the Provincial Council, the City Council and the Royal Board of Commerce, the construction of the line from Madrid to Valladolid, Burgos and Bilbao. Then, following the coast, through Deva, to reach Irun, with the condition that the interests of the localities affected by the route, especially Alava, were taken into account. This law was known in Madrid as the Basque Concession. The change in railway policy in 1851 obliged the Biscayans to adapt to the condition of payment on behalf of the State, by means of a second concession. In 1854 the Espartero-O'Donnell Government was formed and convened the Constituent assembly, from which the General Railway Law of June 3, 1855, was passed, the Northern line being divided into three sections:

- Madrid – Valladolid, through Avila and Medina del Campo
- Valladolid – Burgos
- Burgos – France, through Miranda de Ebro.

In November, the license for the Valladolid-Burgos section was given to the Pereire, and in July 1856 the concession of the other two sections: Madrid–Valladolid and the one from Burgos to the French border, was given to the Sociedad de Crédito Mobiliario Español, having to pass through Miranda de Ebro, Vitoria, Alsasua, Tolosa and San Sebastián. This law also granted an authorization to Compañía de los Ferrocarriles de Madrid a Zaragoza y Alicante (MZA) for the construction of a railway from Zaragoza through Tudela and Pamplona to connect in Alsasua with the Northern Railway. Thus, the three sections of the Northern Railway remained the property of the Crédito Mobiliario Español, since although the Valladolid–Burgos section was in the name of private individuals, they belonged to the Sociedad de Crédito and would be transferred to it.

That same year they were granted the branch line from Venta de Baños to Alar del Rey, which would continue to Santander with a branch line to the mines of Barruelo de Santullán, thereby linking the railway, the coal mines and a Cantabrian port with the gas factory in Madrid.

Due to the competition of the MZA to obtain all these concessions, the Pereires had to force the reduction in the State subsidies for each line, since the concessions were given according to whoever reduced the announced subsidy rate the most. Finally, on December 29, 1858, the Compañía de los Caminos de Hierro del Norte de España was officially created, with a capital of 380 million reales and 200,000 shares distributed among Crédito Mobiliario Español (the largest shareholding with 52,700 shares, 26.35%); Crédit Mobilier (29,400 shares, 14.7%); the Sociedad General Belga (with 20,000, 10%); the Pereires (14,000, 7%), up to the 500 shares of the Duke of Alba (0.25%). As the Spanish subscribed capital did not reach 25% of the foreign capital, the dominance of the latter was evident.

=== Construction of the Madrid-Irun line ===
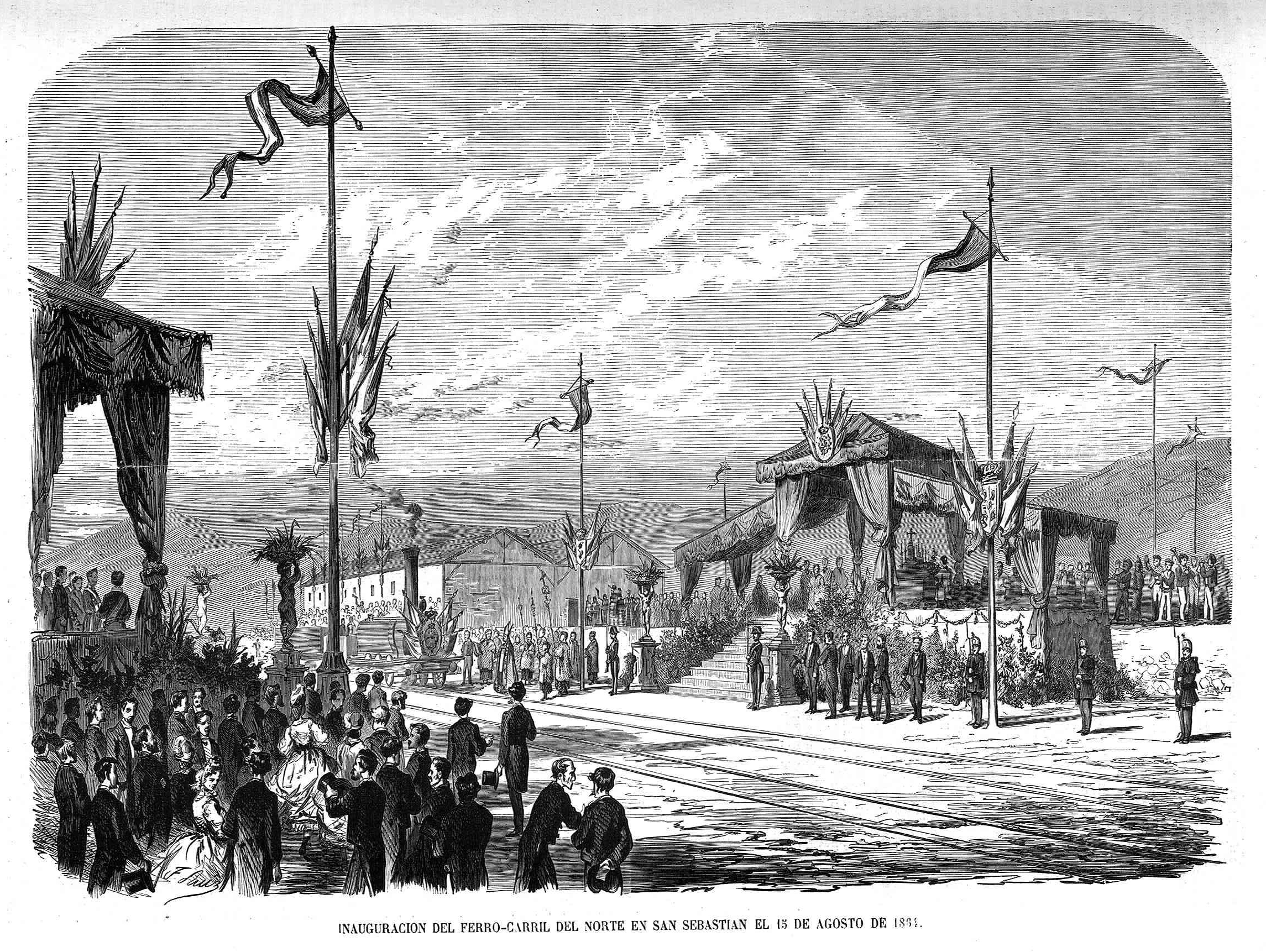
Inauguration of the Northern Railway in San Sebastian on August 15, 1864.

Norte organized the works in two sections, one between Madrid and Torquemada and from Venta de Baños to Alar del Rey, under the direction of engineer M. Fournier, based in Valladolid, and the other between Torquemada and Irún, under the command of engineer M. Latourneur, based in Vitoria. Both depended on the engineer M. Lalanne who supervised the works from the French capital. The extension from Burgos to Quintanapalla (16.38 km) and the section between Madrid and El Escorial (50.29 km) was completed in 1861.

The first major difficulty that the line's engineers had to face was the Sierra de Guadarrama, which was solved with the completion of the Torrelodones tunnel. In 1863 the Castilian sections between Ávila and Sanchidrián (30.41 km) and El Escorial and Ávila (70.27 km) were completed, while work continued on the less complicated areas of the Basque Country, linking Beasáin with San Sebastián (41.40 km) and the latter with Irún (16.87 km). On August 15, 1864, King consort Francis of Assisi, husband of Queen Isabella II, presided over the inaugural trip of what began to be called the Línea Imperial (Imperial Line), which took travelers from Madrid to San Sebastian. The train made a special stop at the Ormaiztegi Viaduct, another of the great engineering works of the line.

=== Expansion stage ===
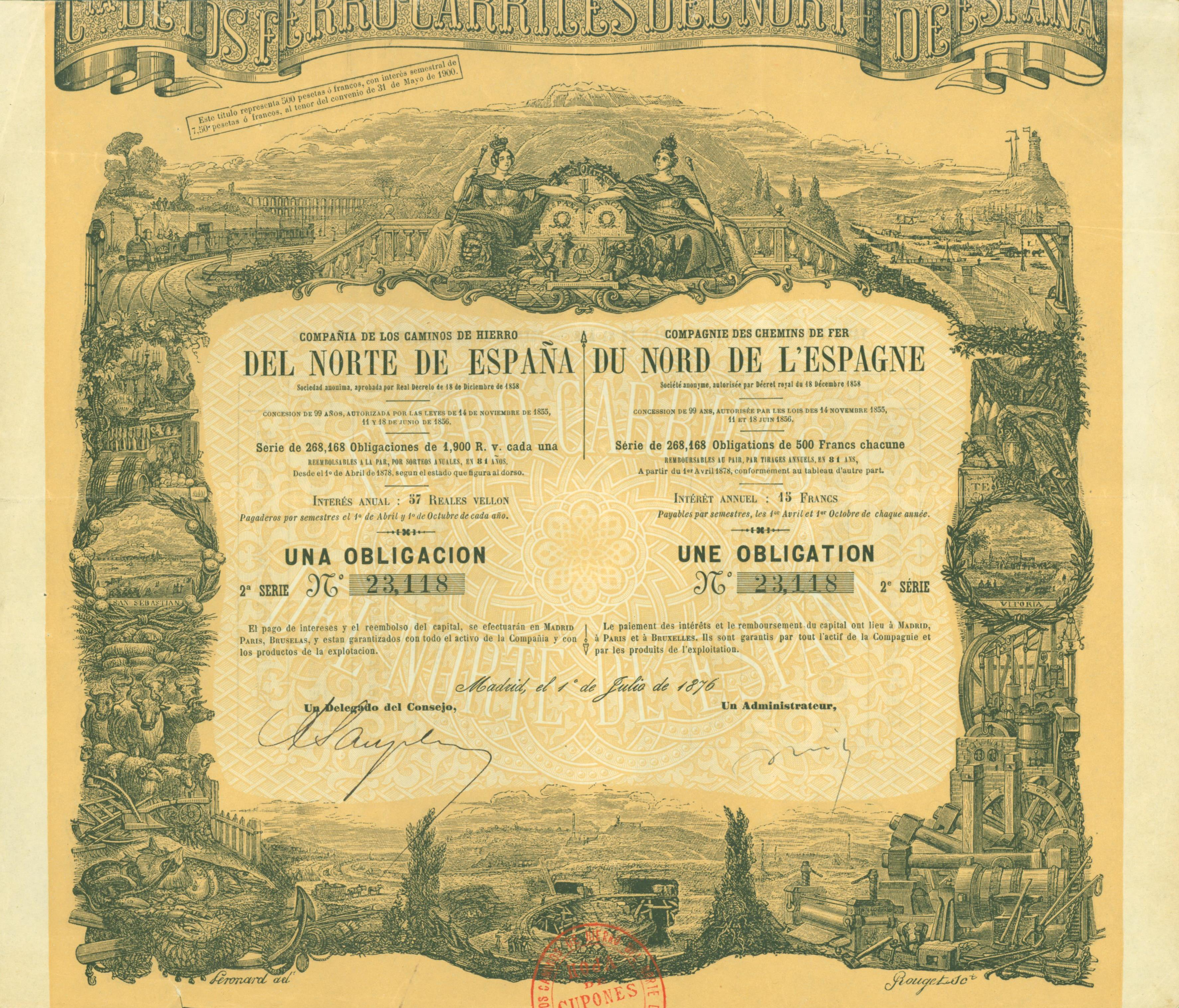
Bond of the Compañía de los Caminos de Hierro del Norte de España, issued July 1, 1876

Between 1872 and 1876 the Madrid–Irun railway was affected by the Third Carlist War, with the Carlist parties carrying out numerous attacks and sabotages against the railway line that went through the Basque provinces. The company's accounts were also affected by the socio-political instability of the Sexenio Democrático (1868–1874). However, at this time it managed to reach an agreement with its rival MZA, with which it agreed on issues such as the distribution of traffic, etc. At the end of this period, with the economic recovery, many railway companies were in a difficult financial situation and unable to meet the accumulated debts. It was decided then that it was time for an expansion, thus, in 1874, the company took over the railway from Alar del Rey to Santander, which had belonged to the former Isabella II Railway Company, and which was connected to the Madrid-Irun Line through the Venta de Baños station.

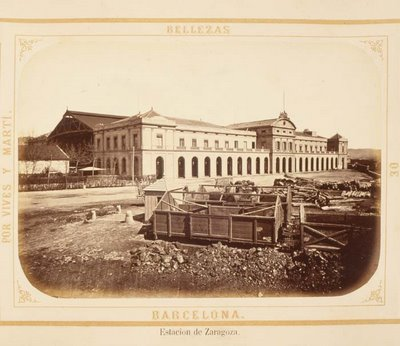
The Barcelona-North Station, photographed around 1874

On February 13, 1878, the Compañía de los Ferrocarriles de Zaragoza a Pamplona y Barcelona (ZPB), which was in a very bad financial situation, was rescued. This annexation was carried out with the consent of MZA in exchange for Norte allowing the other to be annexed in turn to the Compañía del Ferrocarril de Córdoba a Sevilla, a subsidiary of Norte in Andalusia. With the annexation of the ZPB it now had rail lines reaching Pamplona, Huesca, Lérida and Barcelona. On March 24, Norte absorbed the Tudela-Bilbao railway (TB), which allowed it to reach the important Cantabrian port and thus link the capital, Bilbao, with the imperial railway. Around this time, work began on a new station in Madrid, which would be known as Estación del Norte (Northern Station), and which would finally be opened on July 16, 1882, and becoming the headquarters of the company.

In 1880 the Compañía de los Ferrocarriles de Asturias, Galicia y León (AGL) was rescued, which gave it control of the railway lines in the Northwest. However, in this area only some of the lines were operational, such as the León–Astorga section, and many others were not built or were in progress. Between 1880 and 1884 numerous construction works were carried out, and in the latter year the Pajares ramp was inaugurated, a railway section that bridges the difference in level of the Cantabrian mountain range through the Puerto de Pajares. It was considered one of the most important Spanish engineering works of the 19th century. In 1890 a branch line was built from Soto de Rey to the mining area of Langreo, to send its coal directly to Castile without passing through the port of Gijón.

On August 14, 1884, it acquired the Compañía del Ferrocarril de Lérida, Reus y Tarragona, which consolidated its position in the Catalan region. In May 1891, the Sociedad de los Ferrocarriles de Almansa a Valencia y Tarragona (AVT) was annexed, thus incorporating the tracks to Tarragona, Valencia, Almansa and Gandía. The Valencian businessman José Campo Pérez had been the soul of the company, but after his death in 1889 it did not survive much longer.

Norte still tried to undertake one last major expansion with the acquisition of the Compañía de los ferrocarriles de Tarragona a Barcelona y Francia (TBF) and its network in Catalonia, closing the way to its other competitor. The operation was intended to complete the previous acquisition of the railway lines in the Levant, but this failed because MZA went ahead and in 1891 managed to take over the TBF. The expansion in Catalonia had already been completed with the acquisition of the Sociedad de Ferrocarriles y Minas de San Juan de Las Abadesas on December 31, 1887. The annexation on January 1, 1892, of the Compañía de los Caminos de Hierro del Este de España, and the Valencia-Utiel line it owned, would mark the end of this era.

=== Commitment to electrification ===
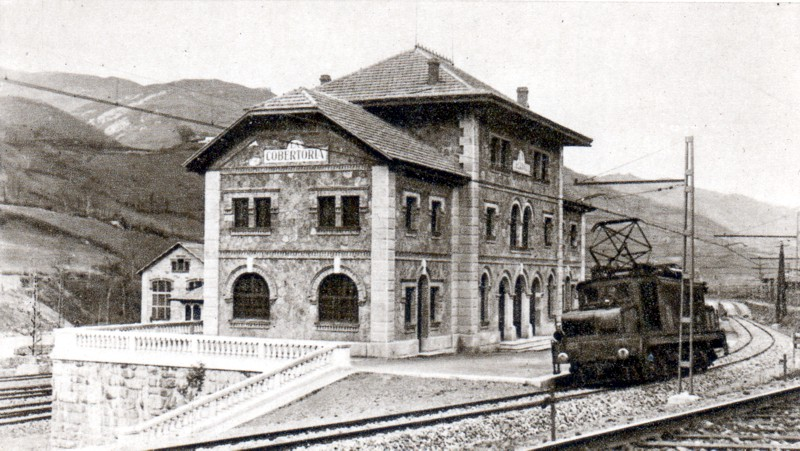
A 6100 series locomotive at La Cobertoria station (1925)

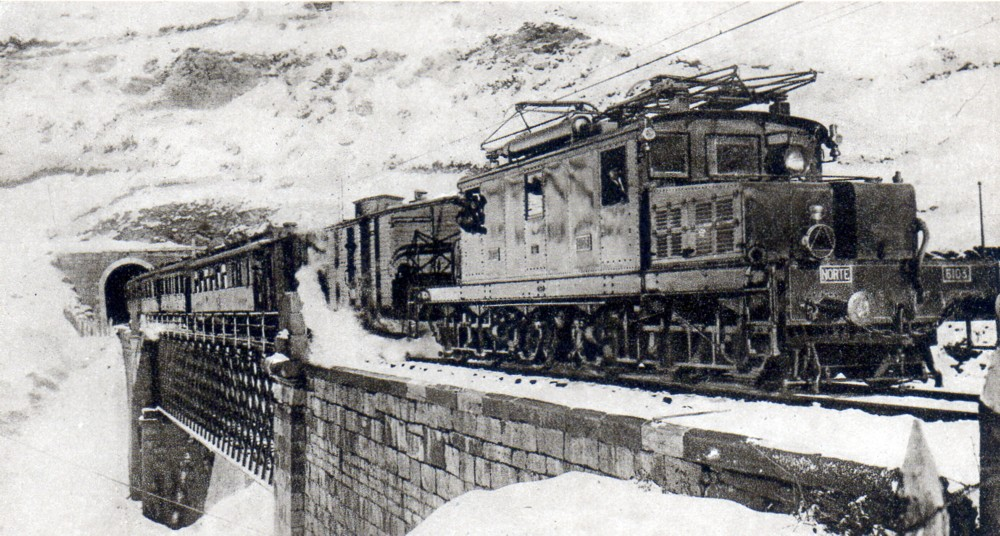
The locomotive 6103 of "Norte" at the Puerto de Pajares

Spanish neutrality during the First World War led to an increase in exports and, consequently, in railway traffic. However, the war also caused difficulties around importing coal, resulting in a serious crisis for the railways.

In 1914 the possibility of electrification began to be seriously considered. In this sense, the Puerto de Pajares line, with a sloping ramp along the entire route and 70 tunnels, was one of the hardest in Spain and for its transit several locomotives were almost always necessary. This is why the decision was made to electrify this section, given that electric locomotives could cope with the circulation and offer more power.

On July 24, 1918, the Minister of Public Works Francesc Cambó approved the electrification of the Pajares ramp, the objective of which was not to electrify the entire line, but only the 62-kilometer section between Uxo and Busdongo. After studying the various proposals submitted by the main North American and European companies, the one presented by the General Electric Company was finally selected. The voltage of the catenary would be 3,000 volts, in direct current. This system was until then used exclusively in the United States and in fact its first important application was for the Chicago, Milwaukee, St. Paul and Pacific Railroad (CMStP&P), between 1915 and 1917. Although this system presented a much higher voltage than that which had been used in Europe until then, it offered the advantage of requiring fewer substations and a cheaper catenary. The contract with General Electric was signed in 1921, and commissioning took place on January 1, 1925.

The good results obtained by Norte in Puerto de Pajares encouraged to repeat the electrification in other lines: in 1927 it was decided to electrify the sections Irún–Alsasua, Barcelona-Manresa and Barcelona-Sant Joan de les Abadesses, but this time with a voltage of 1,500 volts. A year later the different lines entered service in their new configuration and on June 7, 1929, the Irún–Alsasua section did so. In 1935 work began to electrify the Madrid–Avila and Madrid–Segovia sections, although the outbreak of the Civil War left them paralyzed, without ever being completed.

=== Peak period ===
By the 1920s the company had come to be controlled by Spanish capital, especially by the banks of Bilbao and Biscay. By that time it had become the main railway company in Spain, controlling a large network covering the North and East of Spain. The Norte company came to have a large number of workers on its payroll: factors, administrative staff, train drivers, stokers, operators, mechanics, etc. For this reason, within the company, the workers' unions achieved a great influence and capacity for action, as was seen during the railway strike of July 1916. In September 1926 the Compañía del Ferrocarril Central de Aragón was acquired from the Belgian shareholders who controlled it, after which it became a subsidiary of Norte. But, in spite of the fact that it controlled the Central de Aragón, Norte did not annex it and formally kept it as an independent company.

The Norte railway benefited from the state aid that the Primo de Rivera dictatorship granted to the companies through the Railway Statute of 1924. However, this aid was abruptly cut off after the proclamation of the Second Republic in 1931. During the Republican period the Spanish railways went through a period of serious crisis in general, although the Norte company managed to maintain its independence and financial situation.

=== Civil war and nationalization ===
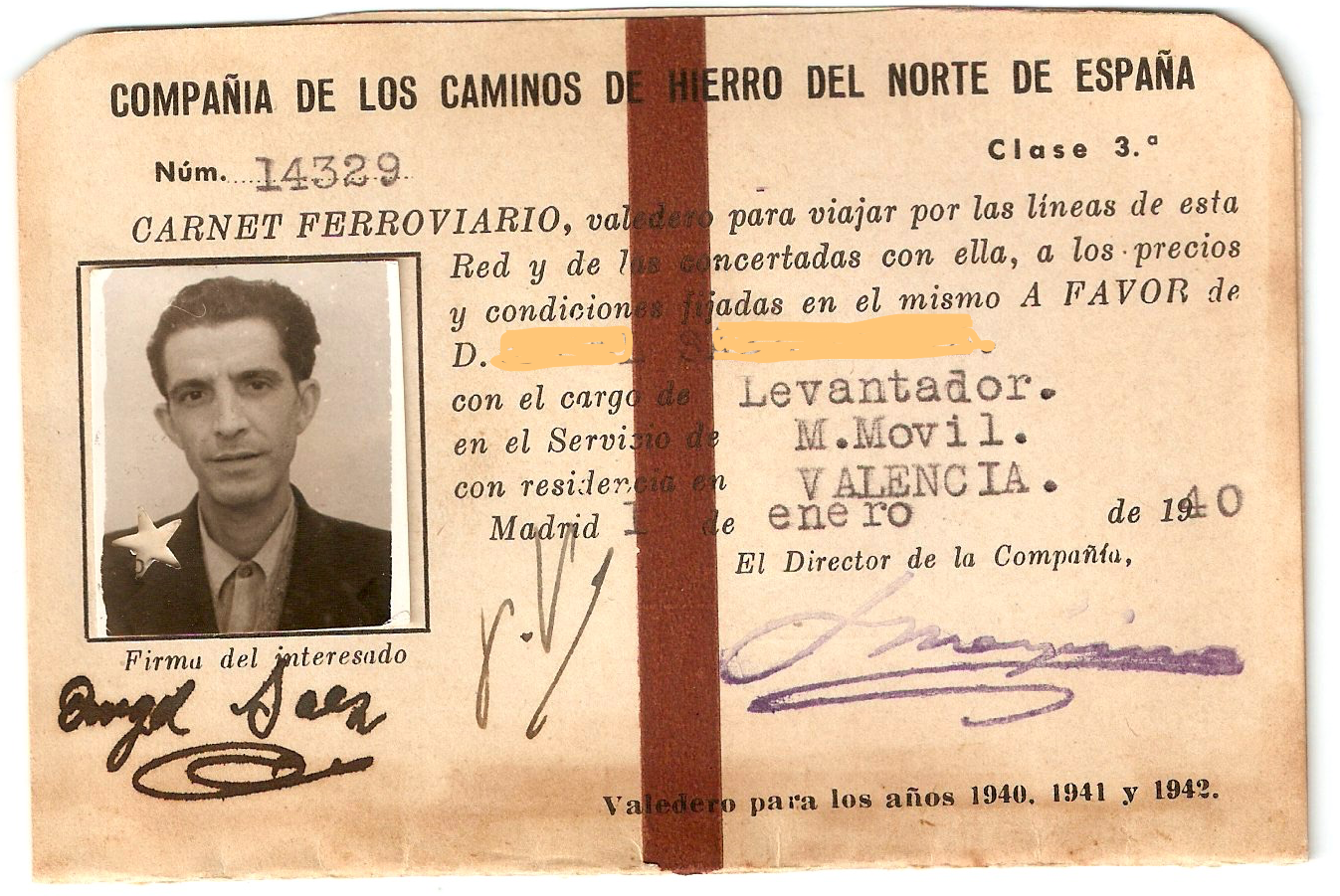
Railway carnet of the Caminos de Hierro del Norte de España, c. 1940.

The outbreak of the Spanish Civil War also marked the history of this company, as it did in so many other situations. The war divided the company's network, facilities and fleet into two parts, with the company's management located in Madrid. The leaders and directors who were in the Republican area quickly fled to the rebel area, while the workers' committees took charge of the situation in the Republican area. At the beginning of the conflict, 2,093 kilometres of the North network (56% of the total) were under government control. In view of the new situation, the Republican government seized all the railways in its area by decree of August 3, 1936, although in practice control fell to the workers' and railwaymen's committees. (Note: In October 1937, the Republican government nationalized all the railway companies that de iure continued to exist in its territory, so that all the lines, facilities and equipment were integrated into a company called Red Nacional de Ferrocarriles.)

In the Francoist area, Norte would continue its existence and the members of the former management who managed to flee to the rebel area tried to rebuild the company within their possibilities, although it would be the military authorities who would actually direct and administer everything related to the railways, as it was crucial for the war effort. However, railway management in this area had to deal with shortages of equipment and spare parts, as well as a lack of specialized personnel.

At the end of the war in 1939, the situation was critical: thousands of kilometers of tracks, bridges, stations, wagons and locomotives had been destroyed during the war, and much of the surviving material was very worn out. The Norte company had to face the destruction or serious damage to 56% of its stations —especially Madrid's Estación del Norte—; 27% of the bridges, viaducts and tunnels; as well as a large number of tracks and railway installations of various kinds. As for the rolling stock, only 66% of the material was useful for the service: of the 1164 steam locomotives that made up the rolling stock, 792 machines (68% of the total) needed to be repaired and another 291 machines (25%) required major repairs; in addition, 6% of the machines had to be scrapped due to their poor condition. The fleet of passenger cars and freight cars was also badly affected by the war.

During the immediate post-war period, Norte focused on the reconstruction of its network, facilities and rolling stock. The railway companies tried to return to the pre-war situation, but their economic situation was disastrous, while the new Francoist state did not touch their independence in principle. This situation changed when the Red Nacional de los Ferrocarriles Españoles (Renfe) was created at the beginning of 1941, after which all the broad gauge railways were nationalized and integrated into Renfe.

== Rolling stock ==
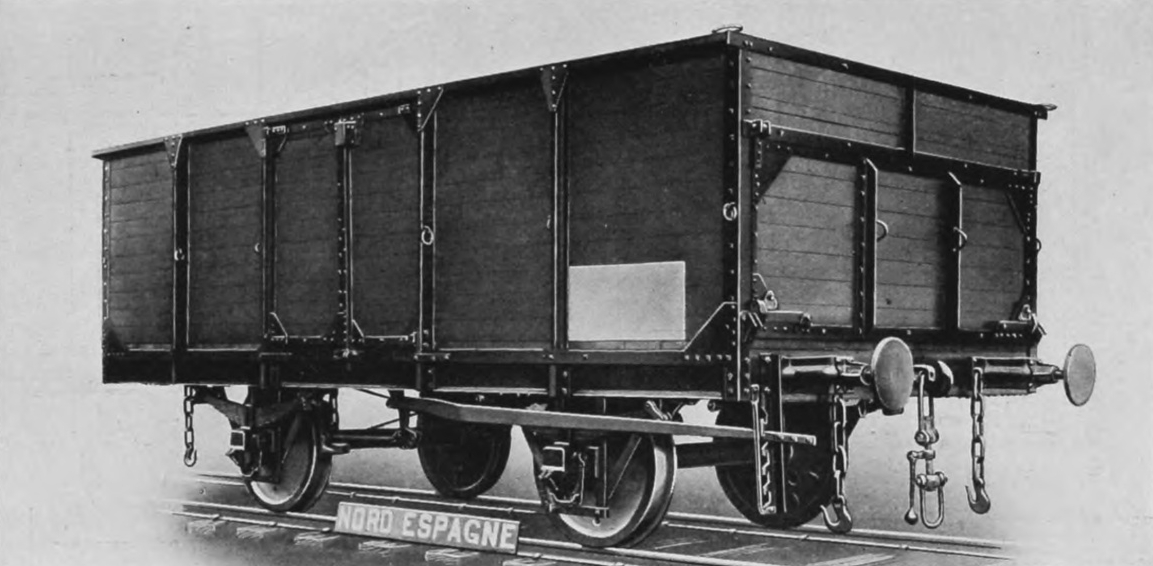
Open wagon built in the USA by Gregg Company

By the end of 1865 Norte owned 180 steam locomotives, 575 coaches and 2,564 goods wagons. In 1936 the company owned 1,216 locomotives, 3,292 coaches and 30,710 goods wagons.

== Gallery of stations ==
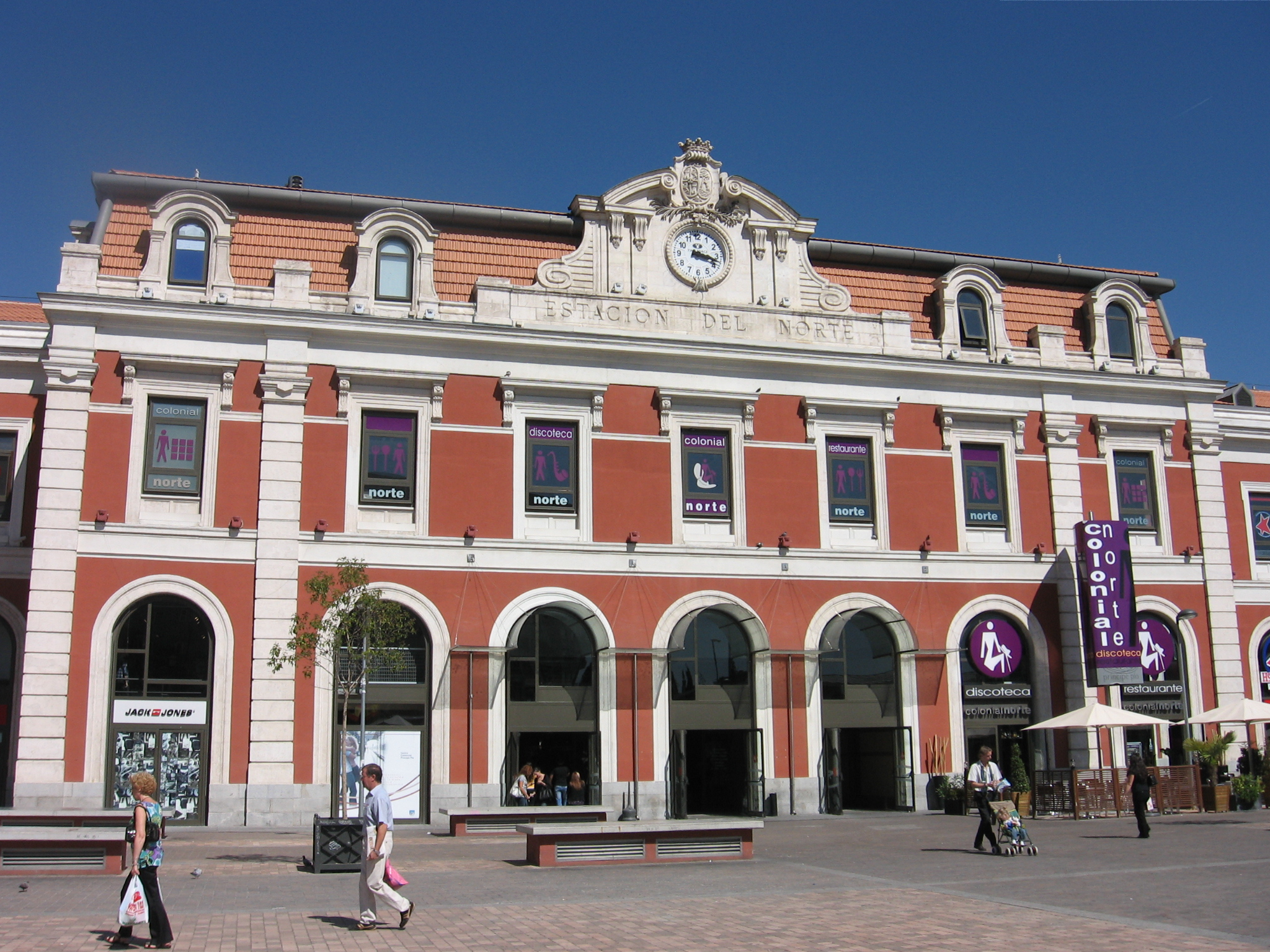
Former Madrid North Station.

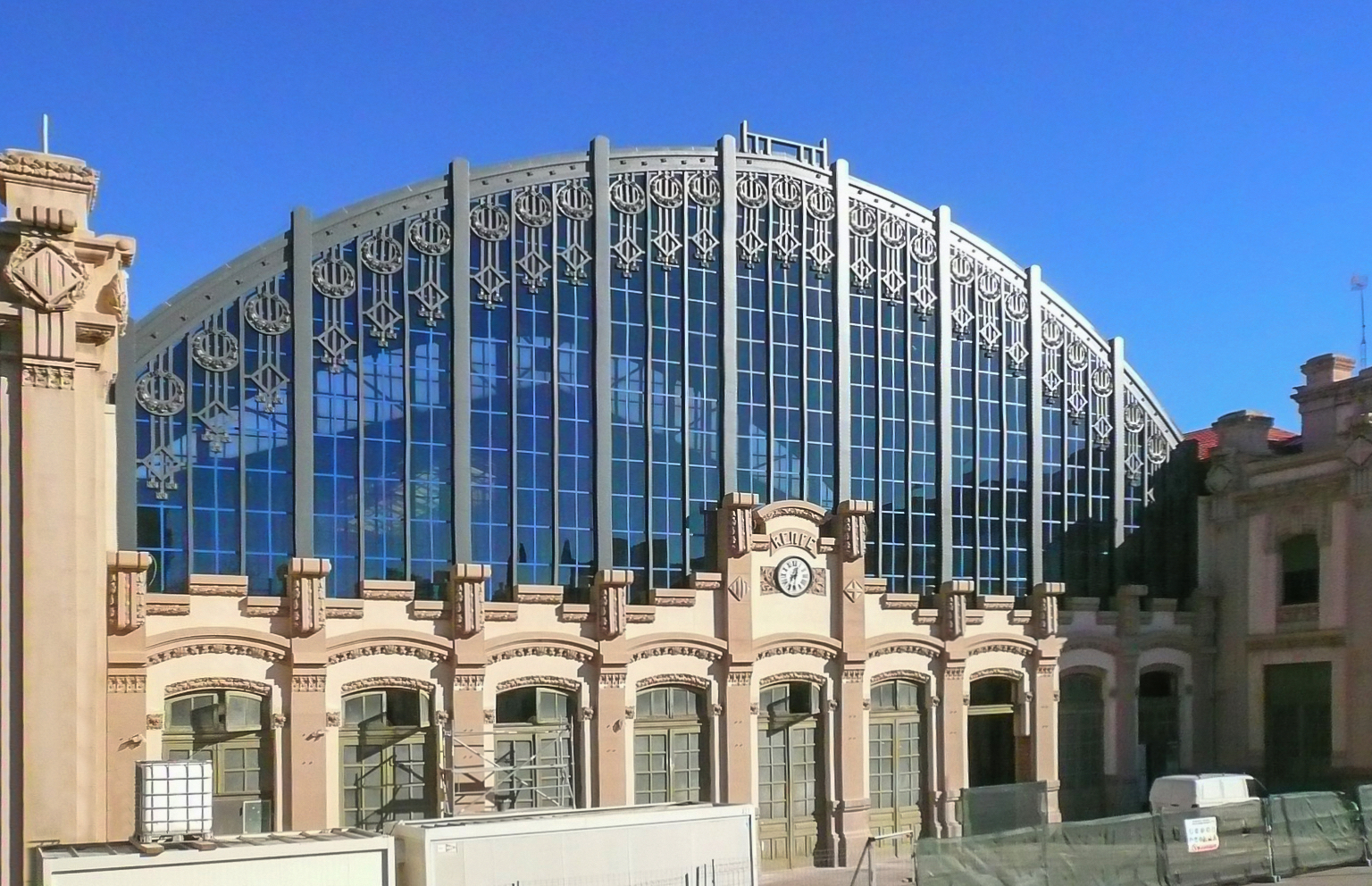
Former Barcelona North Station.

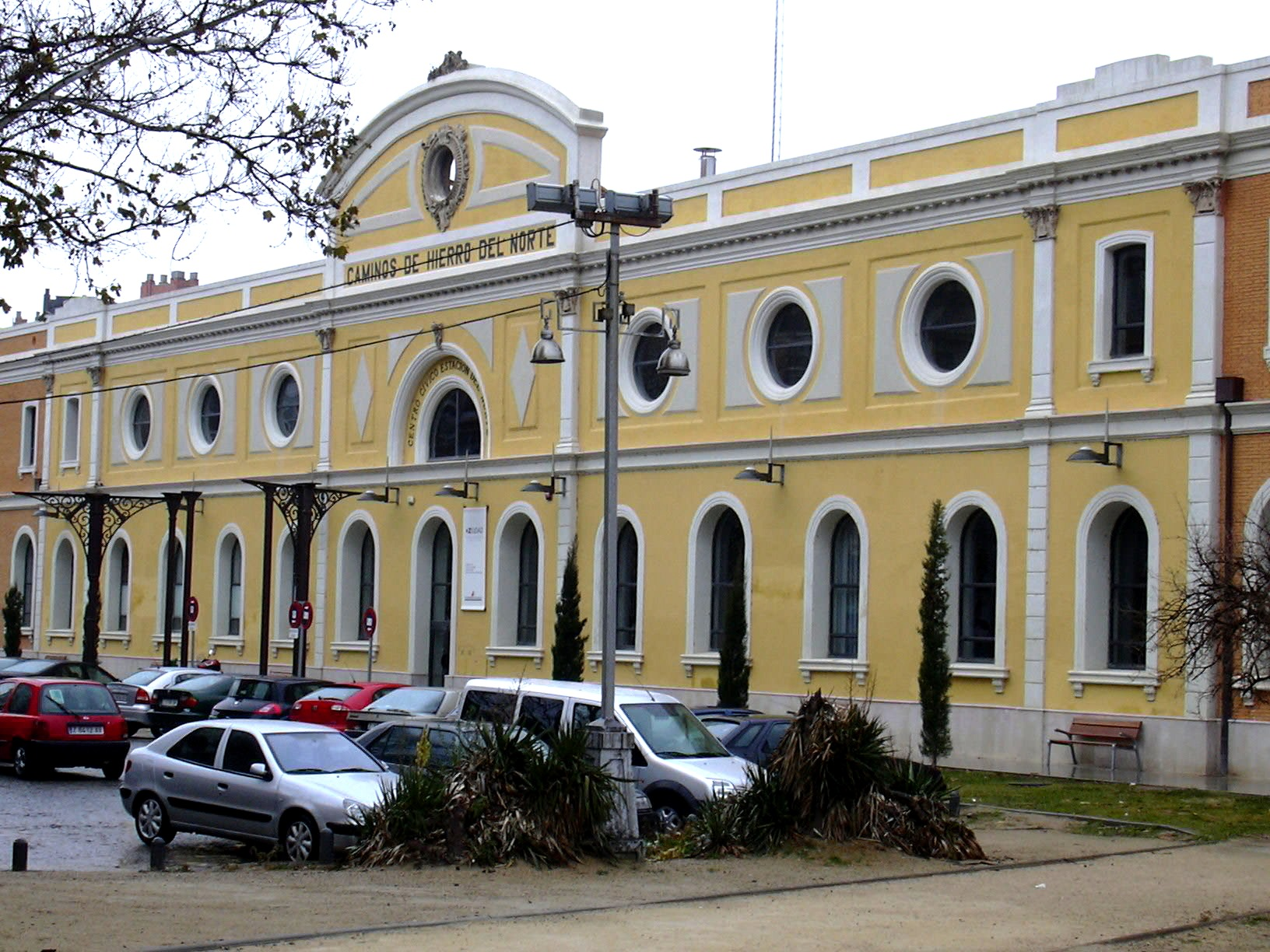
Former Zaragoza North Station.

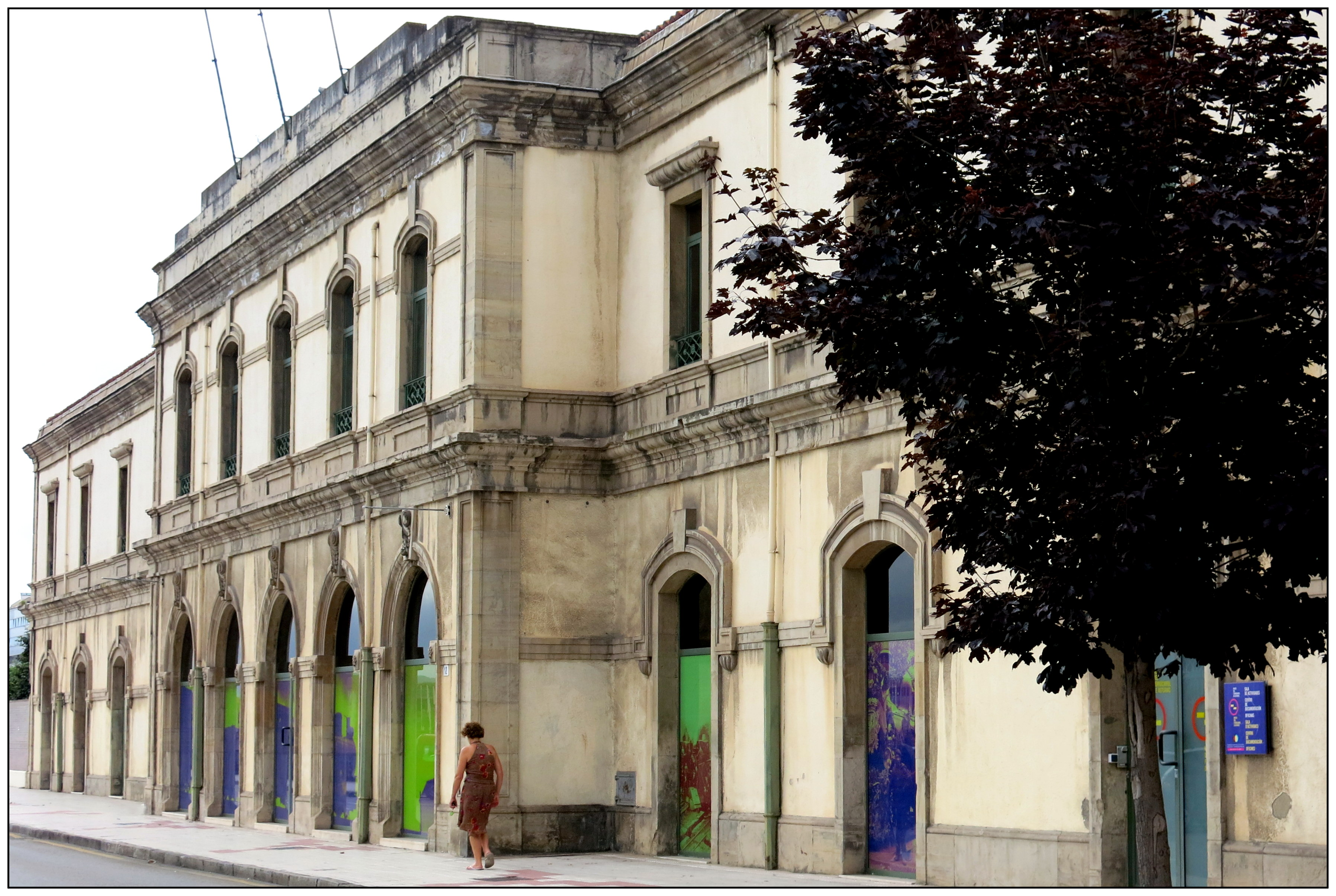
Former Gijón North Station.

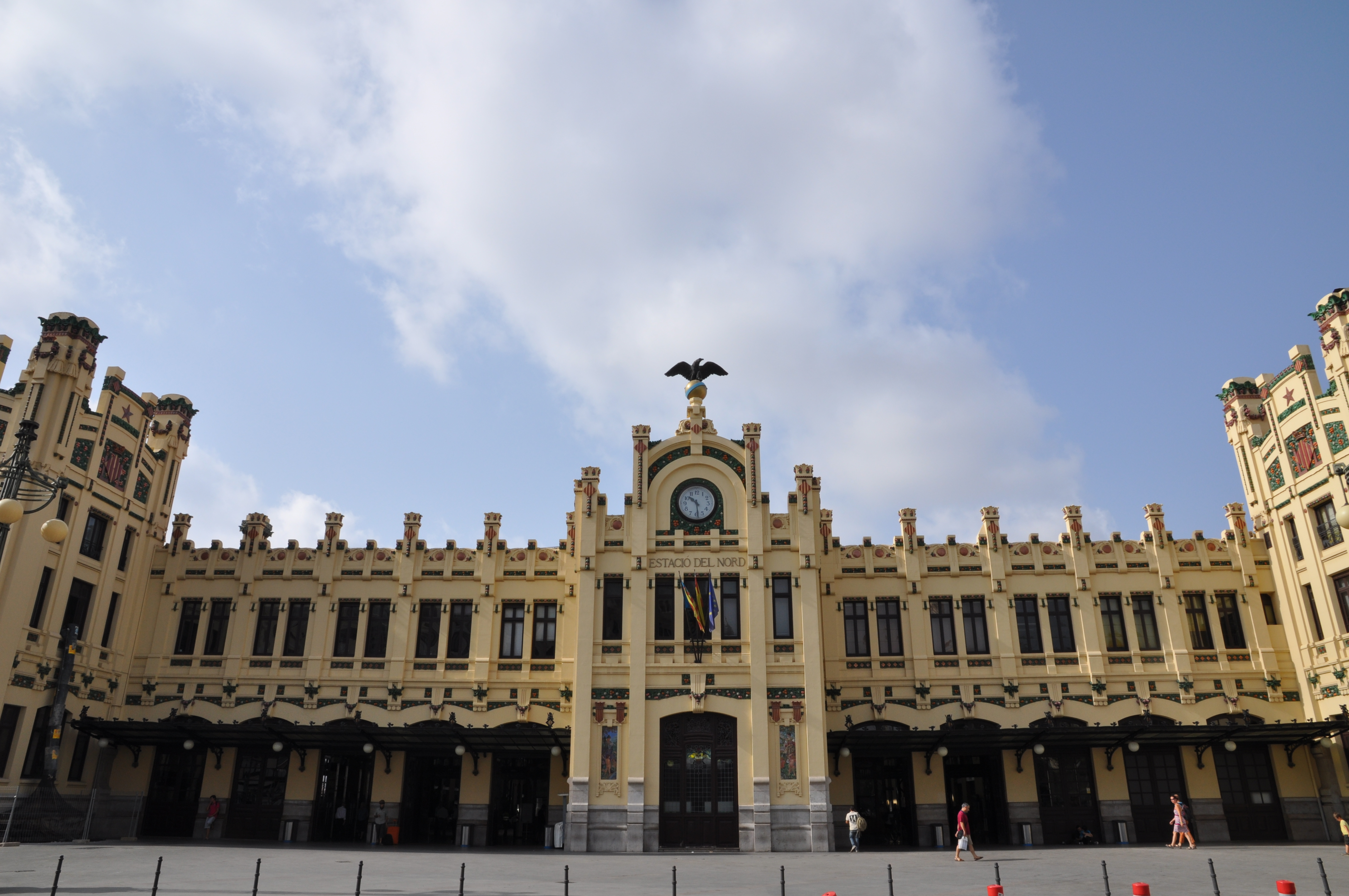
Valencia North Station.

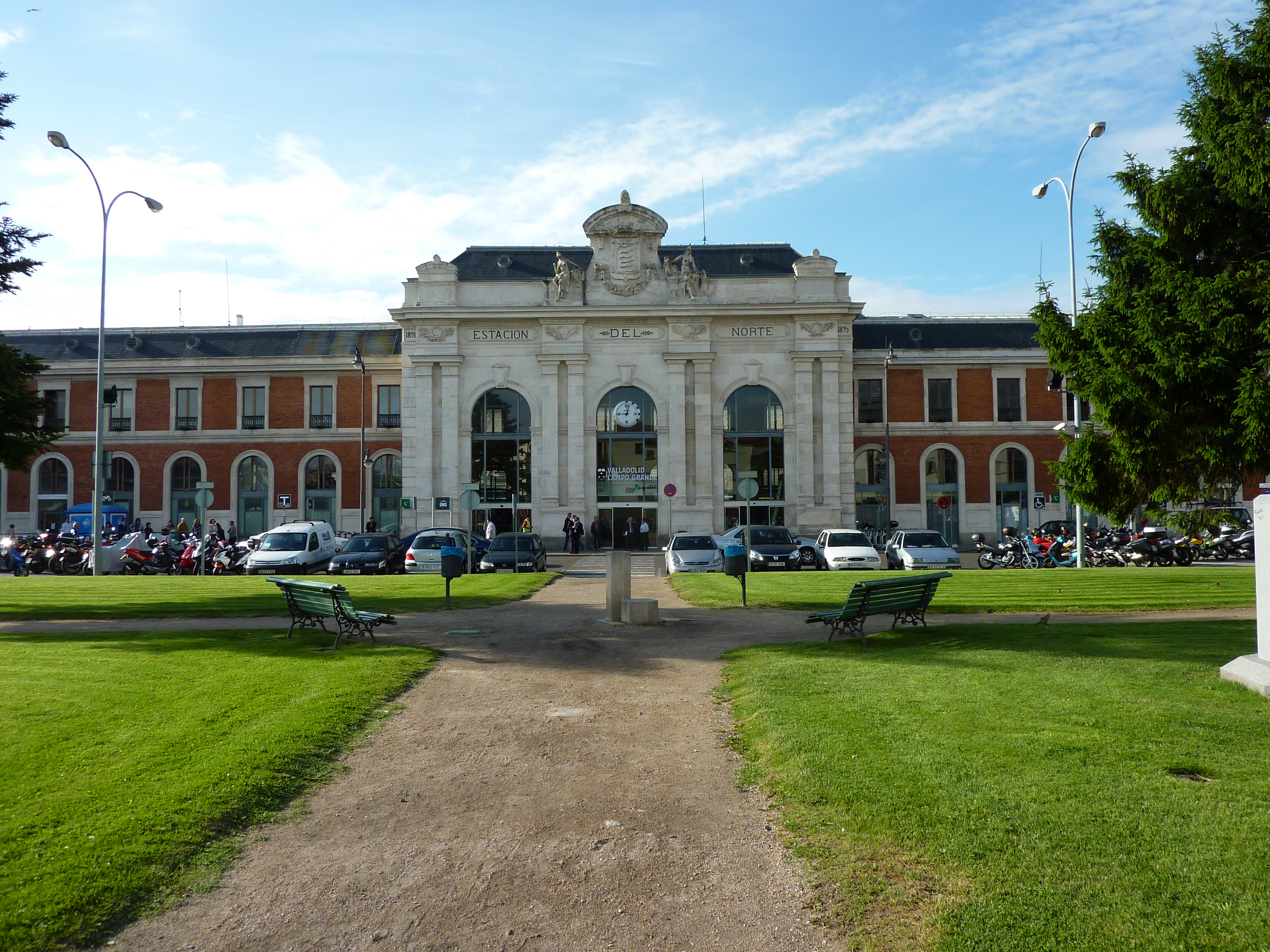
Valladolid North Station.

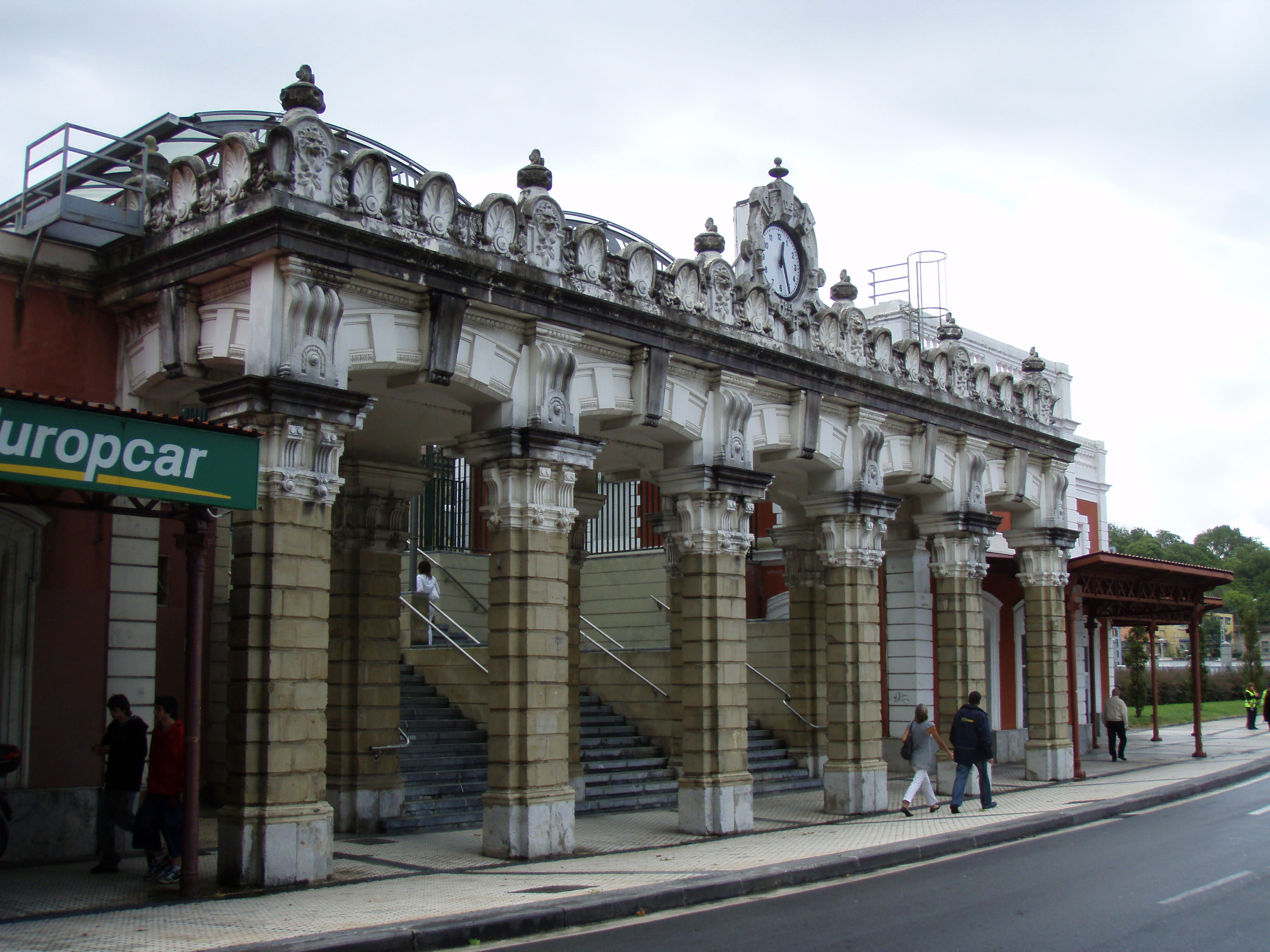
San Sebastian North Station.

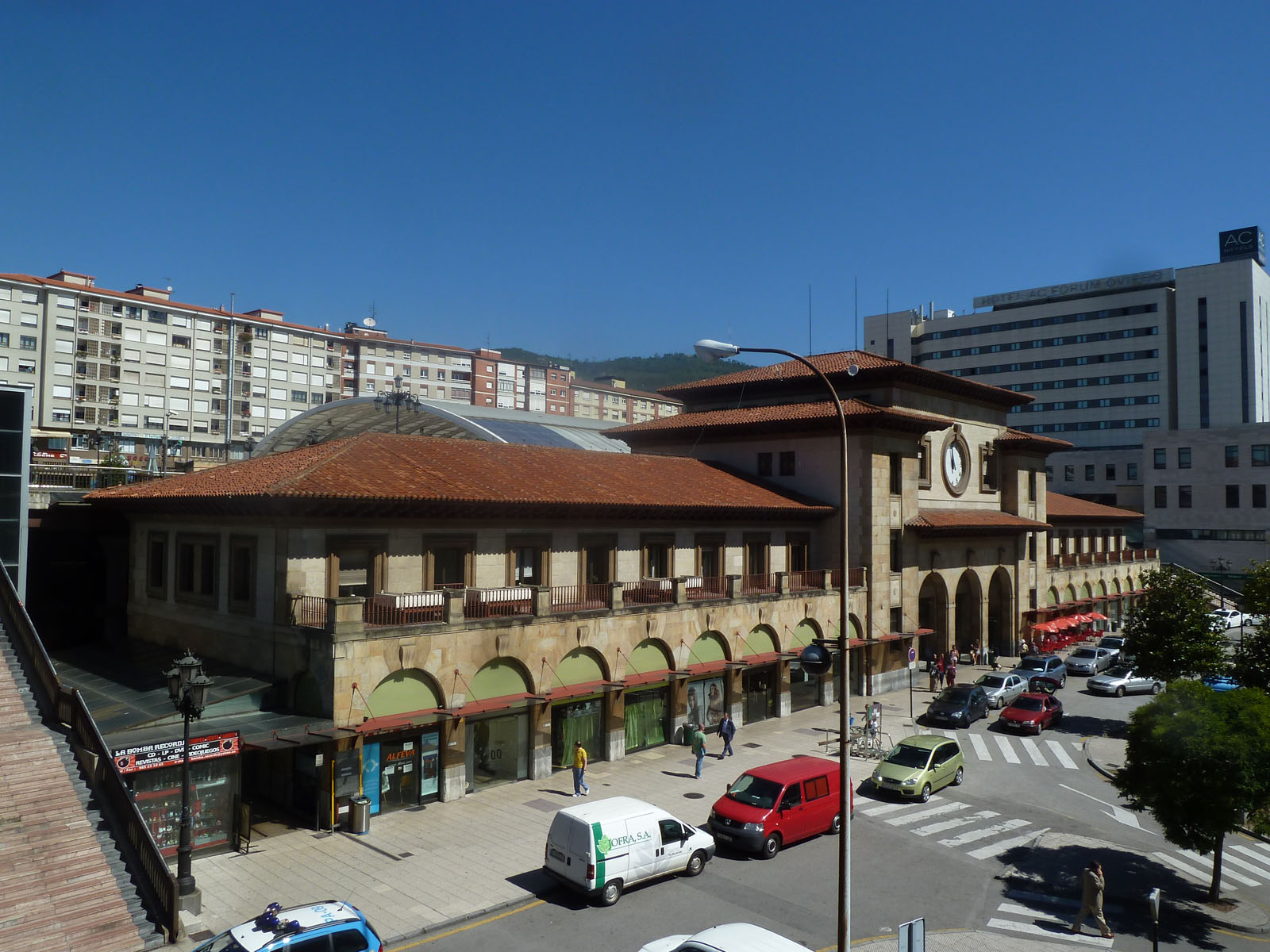
Oviedo North Station.

== See also ==
- Madrid–Hendaye railway

== Bibliography ==
- Anes, Rafael; Tedde de Lorca, Pedro (1978). Ferrocarriles en España, 1844–1943. Volumen 2: Economía y los ferrocarriles (in Spanish). Madrid: Servicio de Estudios del Banco de España.
- Artola, Miguel (1978). "La acción del Estado". Historia de los ferrocarriles españoles 1844–1943 I. El Estado y los ferrocarriles (in Spanish). Madrid: Servicio de Estudios del Banco de España.
- Comín, Francisco (1998). 150 años de historia de los ferrocarriles españoles (in Spanish). Vol. 1. Anaya.
- Fernández Clemente, Eloy (1995). Gente de orden. Aragón durante la dictadura de Primo de Rivera, 1923–1930 (in Spanish). Vol. 3. Ibercaja.
- García Raya, Joaquín (2006). Cronología básica del ferrocarril español de vía ancha (PDF) (in Spanish). Consejería de Obras Públicas y Transportes de la Junta de Andalucía.
- Lentisco, David (2005). Cuando el hierro se hace camino, Historia del Ferrocarril en España (in Spanish). Madrid: Alianza Editorial.
- López-Morell, Miguel Ángel (2005). La Casa Rothschild en España (1812–1941) (in Spanish). Madrid: Marcial Pons. ISBN 84-95379-84-8.
- Martín Aceña, Pablo; Martínez Ruiz, Elena (2006). La economía de la guerra civil (in Spanish). Marcial Pons Historia.
- Martínez Verón, Jesús (2015). Zaragoza. Arquitectura. Siglo XX. Tipologías (in Spanish). Lulu.com.
- Rodríguez Lázaro, Javier (2000). Los primeros ferrocarriles (in Spanish). Madrid: Ediciones Akal.
- Wais, Francisco (1974). Historia de los Ferrocarriles Españoles (in Spanish). Madrid: Editora Nacional.
