= Girona railway station =

Railway station in Girona, Spain

Girona
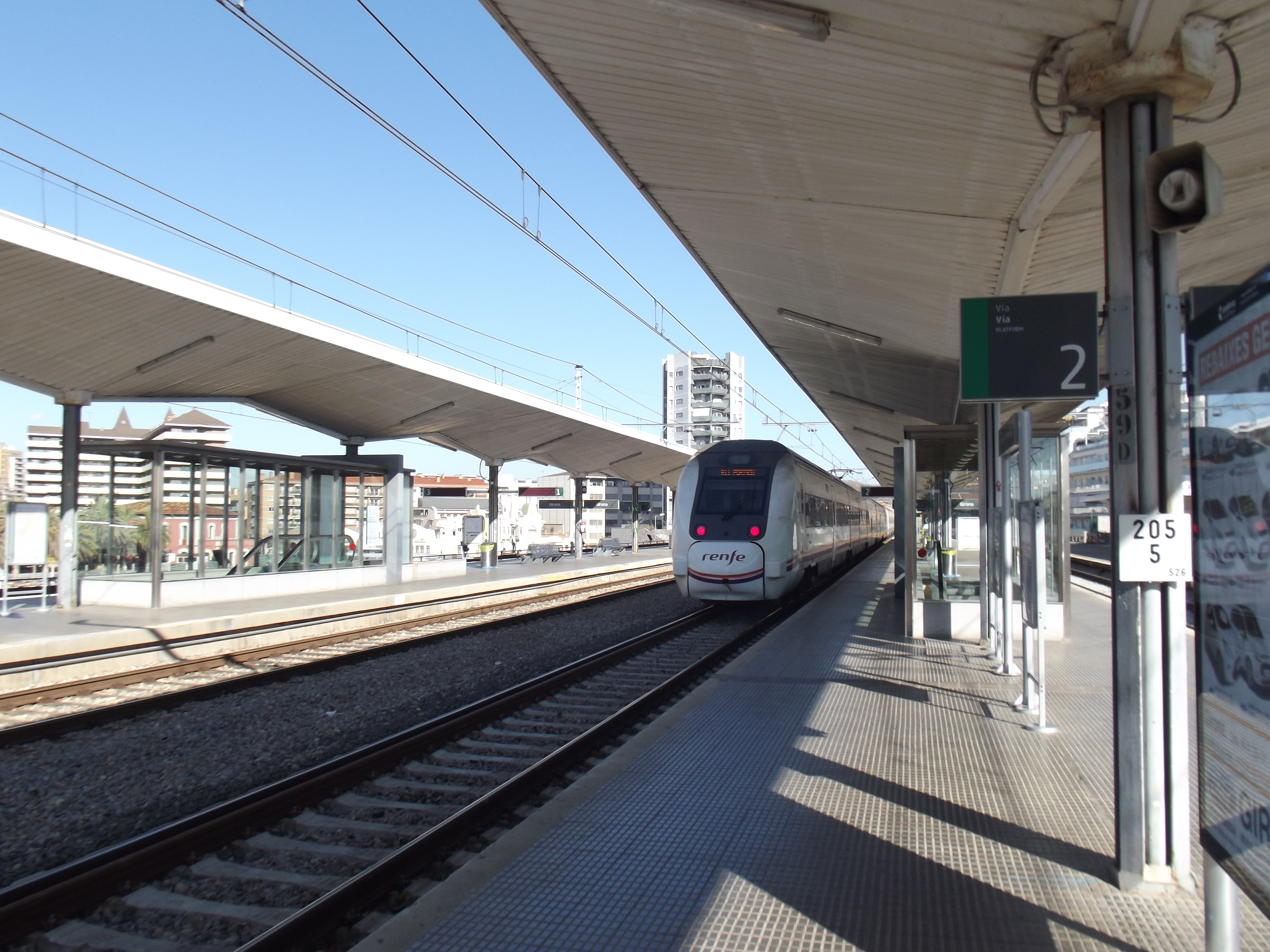
- The platforms at the station's elevated area with a Renfe series 449 EMU departing towards Portbou

General information
- Location: Plaça d'Espanya; 17002 Girona; Spain
- Coordinates: 41°58′40.23″N 2°48′59.18″E
- Elevation: 75.2 metres (247 ft)
- Owner: Adif
- Operator: Renfe Operadora and SNCF
- Lines: Barcelona–Cerbère (PK 205.6); Madrid–Barcelona–Figueres (high-speed) (PK 715.7)
- Platforms: 5 island platforms (3 for the elevated area and 2 for the underground area)
- Tracks: 9 (5 at the elevated area and 4 at the underground area)
- Connections: Adjacent bus station

Construction
- Structure type: Elevated, underground
- Depth: 26 m (85 ft)
- Parking: Several pay parking garages are located near the station.
- Cycle facilities: A bicycle parking rack and a Girocleta station are located adjacent to the station's main entrance.
- Accessible: Yes

Other information
- Station code: 79300

History
- Opened: 1862
- Rebuilt: 1973

Passengers
- 2018: 3,624,517
Location

Girona (Catalan: Estació de Girona) is a railway station serving the city of Girona in Catalonia, Spain. It is located in the northern part of the municipality, lying at approximately 1 kilometre (0.62 mi) southwest of the city's historical centre.

The station is on the Barcelona–Cerbère conventional rail line and the Perpignan–Barcelona high-speed rail line. It is served by Rodalies de Catalunya regional line R11 and Girona commuter rail service line RG1, as well as by several national and international AVE and TGV high-speed services operated by Renfe Operadora and SNCF.

Girona also has a freight station, located about 3 kilometres (1.9 mi) south of the passenger station.

== History ==
This station was opened in 1862, when Iberian (1,668 mm or 5 ft 5 21/32 in) gauge trains on the Barcelona–Cerbère line started arriving from Maçanet de la Selva. From 1892, the station was also served by narrow (750 mm or 2 ft 5 1/2 in) gauge trains on the Sant Feliu de Guíxols–Girona railway and, from 1898, by narrow (1,000 mm or 3 ft 3 3/8 in) gauge trains on the Olot–Girona railway. Both these narrow gauge lines closed in 1969. Girona's third narrow gauge line, the Palamós–Girona–Banyoles railway that served the city between 1921 and 1956, terminated some distance away at Porta de França.

The Iberian gauge station was re-located onto an elevated viaduct in 1973. By 2012, the station, while remaining in the same location, was planned to become subterranean with all tracks including the new high speed from Barcelona to France moved underground. However, due to severe work delays the underground station opened on 8 January 2013 with only the standard (1,435 mm or 4 ft 8 1/2 in) gauge high speed tracks, and the elevated station remains in service.

== Station layout ==
Girona station has tracks on two levels. Trains on the original Barcelona–Cerbère line operate via a set of high-level platforms situated on a viaduct, whilst trains on the new high speed line from Barcelona to France operate through a set of low-level platforms.

The station has a large passenger building underneath the high-level tracks, where there are several services including commercial establishments. The Girona bus station is located just next door. The trains run on the upper level, which is accessed by stairs, escalators, and elevators. This level has a total of four tracks: two general, one Iberian gauge siding on one side and one standard gauge siding on the other side. There are a total of three platforms, partially covered by canopies, and a building on the right of way dedicated to traffic and various services related to railways.

The low-level platforms are situated parallel to, and just to the west of, the high-level platforms, but are 26 metres (85 ft) below ground level. There are four standard gauge tracks, on either side of two island platforms. The platforms are accessed by stairs, escalators, and elevators from an entrance hall above the tracks.

The former station building of the Olot–Girona railway still stands, adjacent to the low-level entrance hall, and is included in the Inventory of the Architectural Heritage of Catalonia.

== Services ==
Preceding station	Renfe Operadora	Following station
Barcelona Sants Terminus	Avant	Figueres–Vilafant Terminus
Barcelona Sants towards Madrid Puerta de Atocha	AVE	Figueres–Vilafant Terminus
Barcelona Sants Terminus	AVE	Figueres–Vilafant towards Lyon-Part-Dieu
Barcelona Sants Terminus	AVE	Figueres–Vilafant towards Toulouse-Matabiau
Barcelona Sants towards Madrid Puerta de Atocha	AVE	Figueres–Vilafant towards Marseille-St-Charles
Barcelona Sants towards Madrid Puerta de Atocha	Avlo	Figueres–Vilafant Terminus
Preceding station	Rodalies de Catalunya	Following station
Fornells de la Selva towards L'Hospitalet de Llobregat	RG1	Celrà towards Portbou
Fornells de la Selva Regional (R) services only towards Barcelona Sants	R11	Celrà Regional (R) services only towards Cerbère
Preceding station	SNCF	Following station
Barcelona Sants Terminus	TGV	Figueres–Vilafant towards Paris-Lyon

== Gallery ==
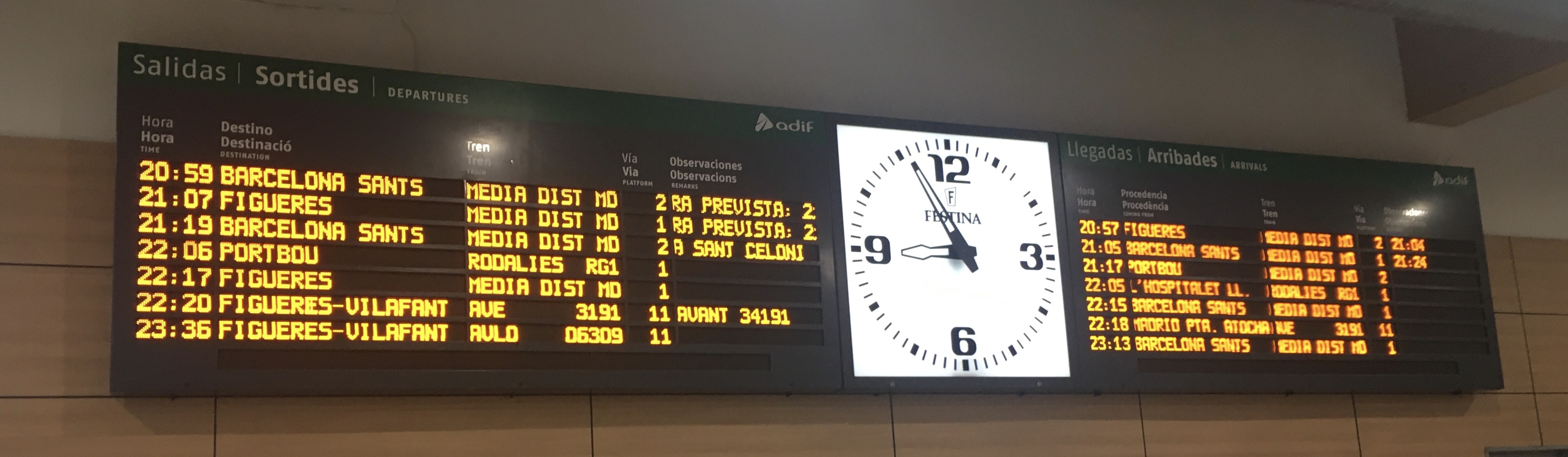
Infogare panel for trains Departures/Arrivals of Girona station

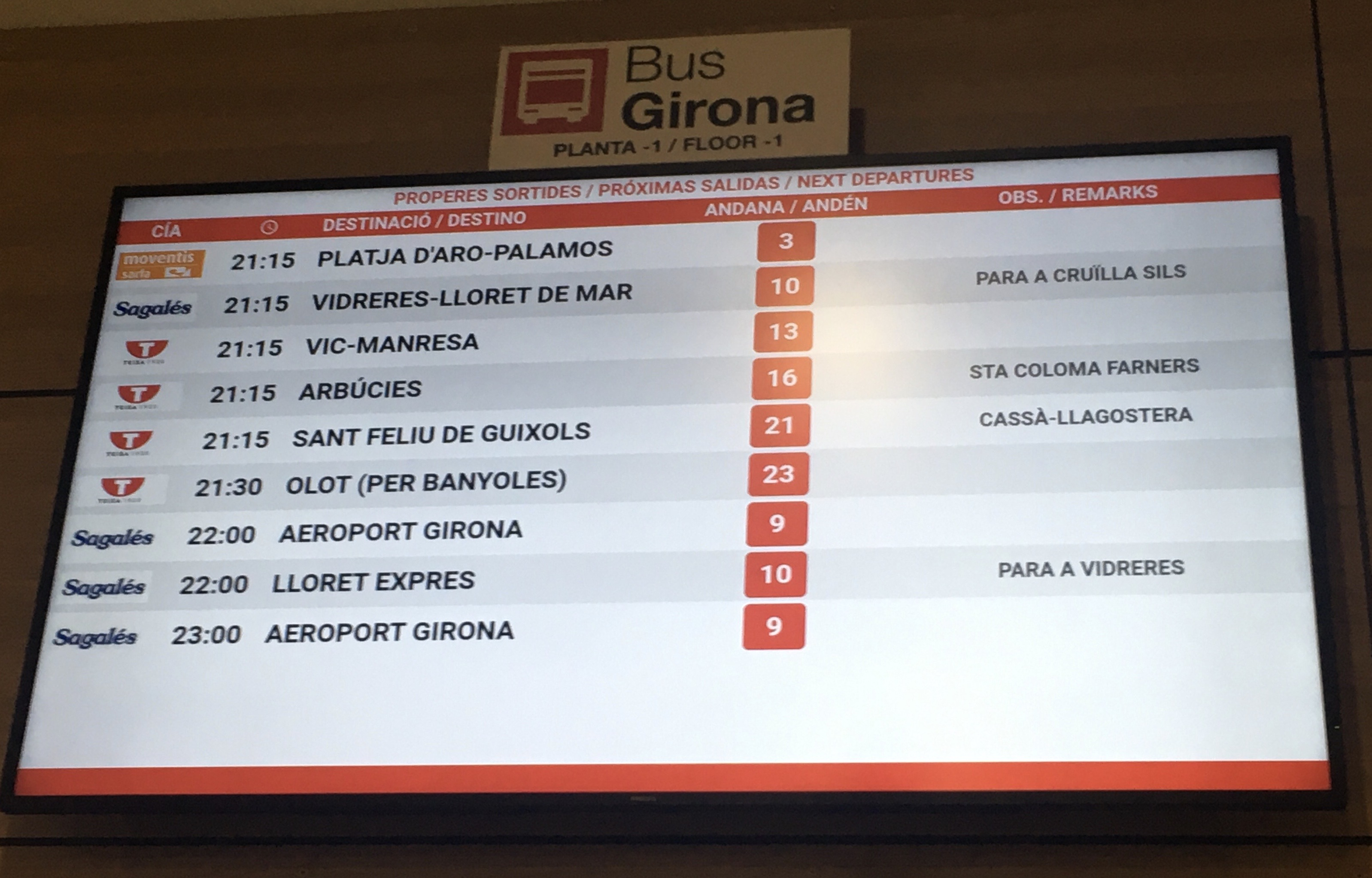
Infogare panel for cars departures of Girona station
