= Zaragoza–Delicias railway station =

Railway station in Spain

Coordinates: 41°39′31″N 0°54′40″W

Zaragoza–Delicias
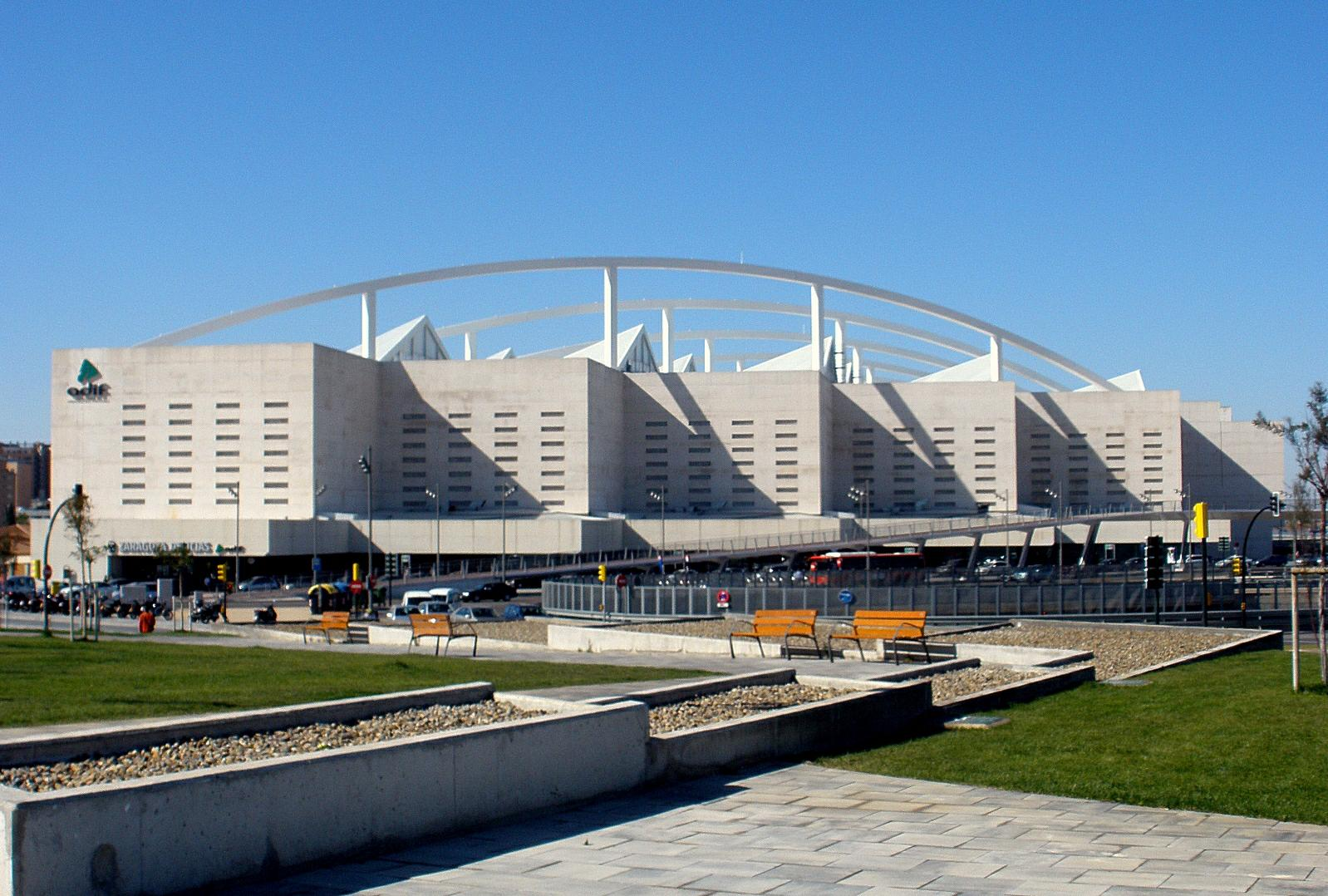
- The building of the station.

General information
- Location: Calle Rioja 33; 50017 Zaragoza; Spain
- Owner: Adif
- Operator: Renfe Operadora
- Lines: Madrid–Barcelona (PK 339.4); Madrid–Barcelona (high-speed) (PK 306.7); Zaragoza–Huesca (high-speed) (PK 0.0)
- Connections: Local and interurban buses

Construction
- Structure type: Underground
- Accessible: Yes

Other information
- Station code: 04040

History
- Opened: 7 May 2003

Passengers
- 2018: 4,017,987

Services
Preceding station	Renfe Operadora	Following station
Guadalajara–Yebes towards Madrid Atocha	AVE	Camp de Tarragona towards Marseille-St-Charles
Preceding station	Ouigo España	Following station
Madrid Atocha Terminus	Madrid to Barcelona	Camp de Tarragona towards Barcelona Sants
Location

Zaragoza–Delicias station is a railway station located in the city of Zaragoza in Aragon, Spain. The station opened on 7 May 2003, and the Central Bus Station Zaragoza opened on 5 May 2007, providing a wide intermodality to passengers. It is served by the AVE high-speed trains between Madrid and Barcelona and onwards to Figueres.

The building was designed by Carlos Ferrater and José María Valero.

== Services ==
Preceding station	Renfe Operadora	Following station
Calatayud Terminus	Avant	Terminus
Calatayud towards Madrid Puerta de Atocha	AVE	Lleida Pirineus towards Barcelona Sants
Calatayud towards Madrid Puerta de Atocha	AVE	Lleida Pirineus towards Figueres–Vilafant
Ciudad Real towards Seville-Santa Justa	AVE	Lleida Pirineus towards Barcelona Sants
Ciudad Real towards Málaga María Zambrano	AVE	Lleida Pirineus towards Barcelona Sants
Calatayud towards Madrid Puerta de Atocha	AVE	Tardienta towards Huesca
Madrid Puerta de Atocha Terminus	Avlo	Barcelona Sants Terminus
Calatayud towards Madrid Puerta de Atocha	Avlo	Lleida Pirineus towards Figueres-Vilafant
Tudela de Navarra towards Bilbao-Abando	Alvia	Lleida Pirineus towards Barcelona Sants
Tudela de Navarra towards Hendaye	Alvia	Lleida Pirineus towards Barcelona Sants
Tudela de Navarra towards A Coruña	Alvia	Lleida Pirineus towards Barcelona Sants
Tudela de Navarra towards Vigo-Guixar	Alvia	Lleida Pirineus towards Barcelona Sants
Tudela de Navarra towards Gijón	Alvia	Lleida Pirineus towards Barcelona Sants
María Huerva towards Cartagena	Intercity	Zaragoza-Portillo towards Miraflores
Cariñena towards Valencia Nord	Intercity	Zaragoza-Portillo towards Miraflores
Terminus	Media Distancia 22	Casetas towards Logroño
Terminus	Media Distancia 26	Casetas towards Vitoria-Gasteiz
Terminus	Media Distancia 34	El Burgo de Ebro towards Barcelona Sant Andreu Comtal
Terminus	Media Distancia 38	Villanueva del Gállego towards Lleida Pirineus
María Huerva towards Valencia Nord	Media Distancia 49	Zaragoza-Portillo towards Huesca
Grisén towards Madrid Chamartín	Media Distancia 55	Terminus
Terminus	Media Distancia 56	Zaragoza-Portillo towards Jaca
Terminus	Media Distancia 56	Zaragoza-Portillo towards Canfranc
Preceding station	Cercanías Zaragoza	Following station
Utebo towards Casetas	C-1	Zaragoza-Portillo towards Miraflores
