= Vilafant =

- Municipality
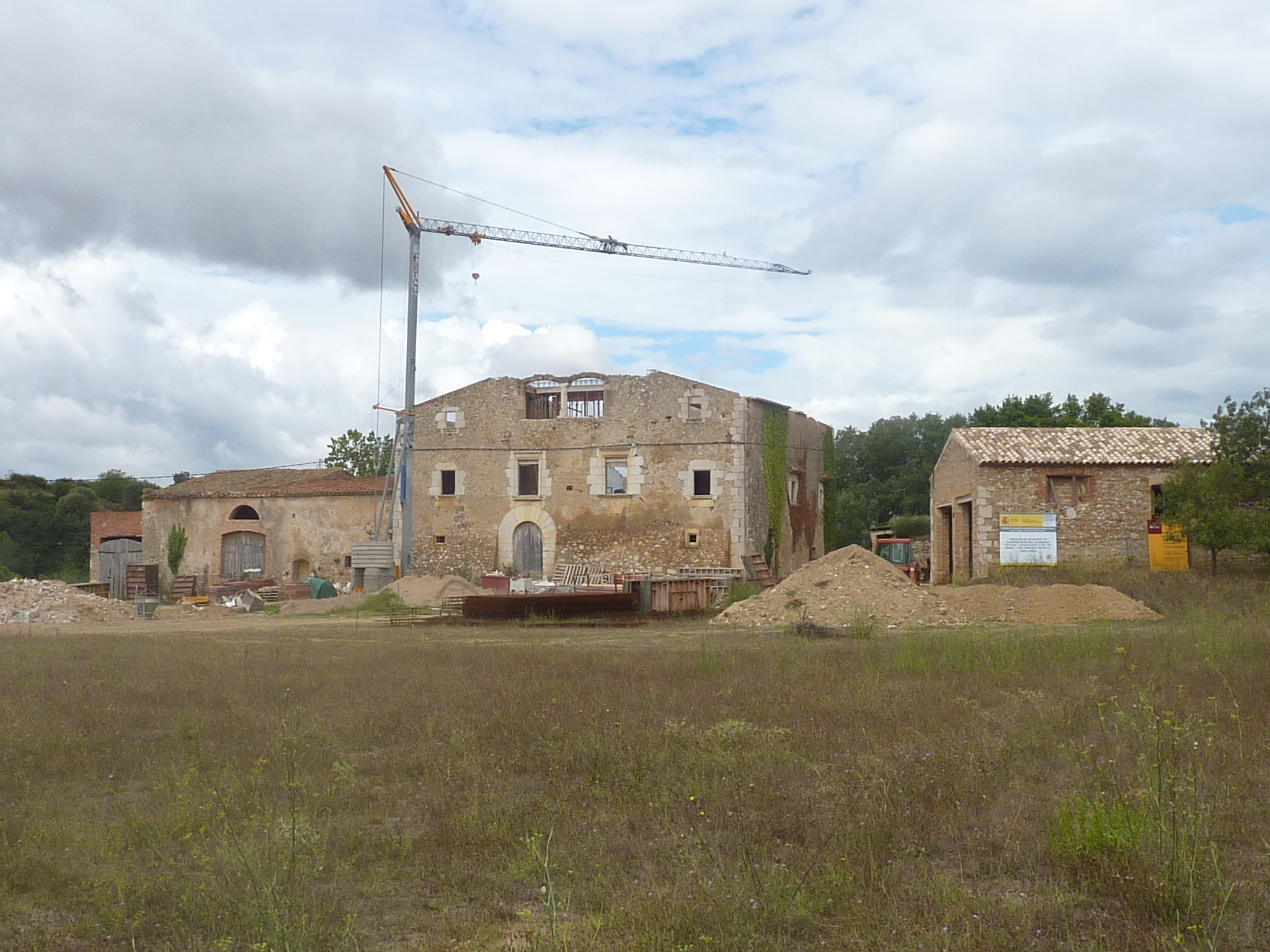
- castle of Palol Sabaldòria

- Coat of arms

- Location in Catalonia Vilafant (Spain)
- Coordinates: 42°15′N 2°57′E
- Country: Spain
- Community: Catalonia
- Province: Girona
- Comarca: Alt Empordà

Government
  - Mayor: Consòl Cantenys Arbolí (2015)

Area
  - Total: 8.4 km^{2} (3.2 sq mi)

Population (2025-01-01)
  - Total: 5,663
  - Density: 670/km^{2} (1,700/sq mi)
- Website: www.vilafant.cat

Vilafant (Catalan pronunciation: [biləˈfan]) is a municipality in the comarca of Alt Empordà, Girona, Catalonia, Spain.
