= Pamplona railway station =

Train station in Navarre, Spain

Pamplona/Iruña
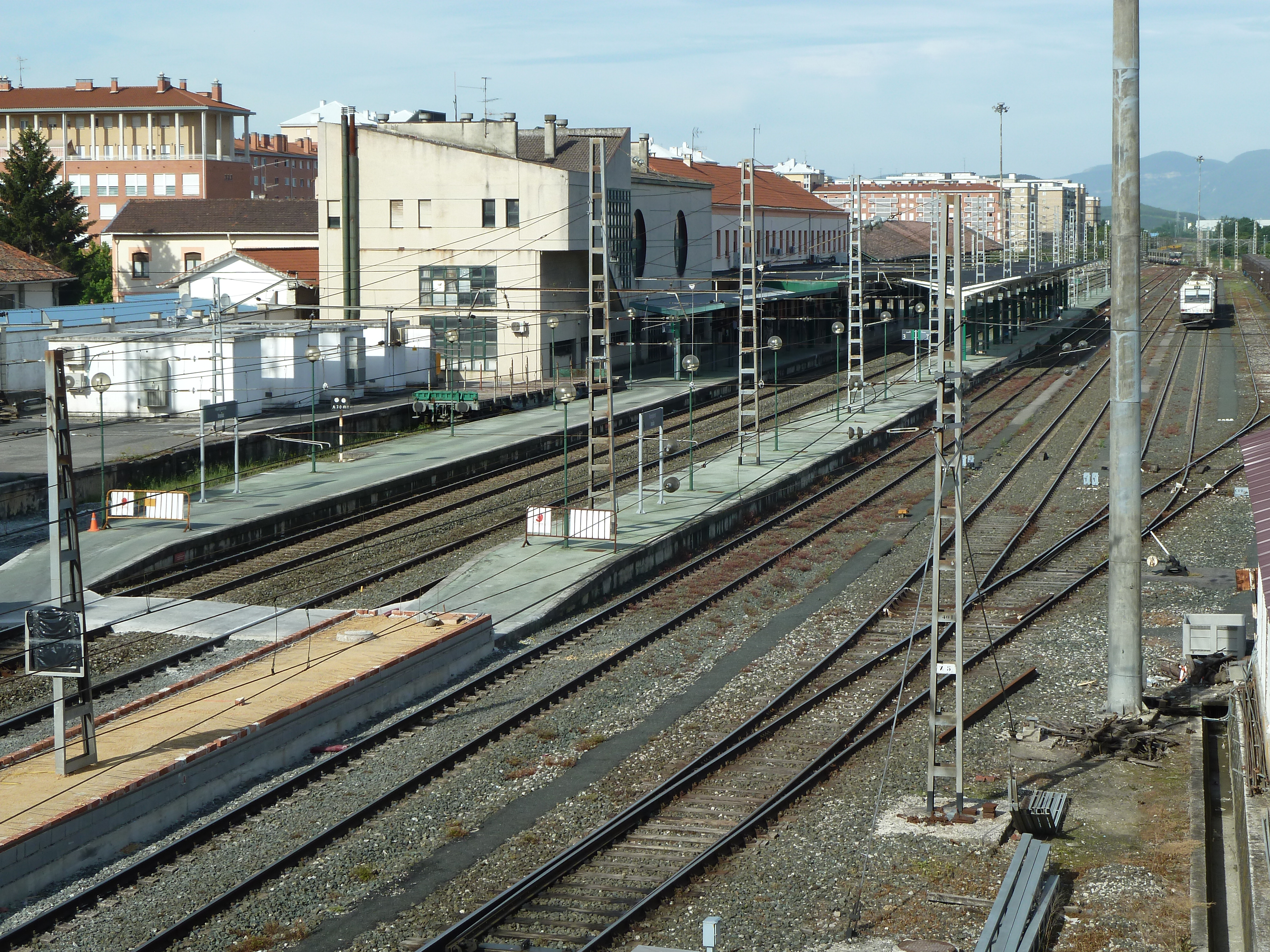
- The train station of Pamplona/Iruña, known as the North Station, was built in 1859 and rebuilt in 1950.

General information
- Location: Pamplona/Iruña, Navarre; Spain
- Coordinates: 42.82498°N 1.66145°W
- Owner: Adif
- Operator: Renfe

Passengers
- 2018: 977,418
Location

Pamplona/Iruña railway station (Pamplona in Spanish, Iruña in Basque and Pamplona/Iruña officially) is the central railway station of Pamplona/Iruña in Navarre, Spain. Commonly referred locally as the Renfe station or Sanduzelai station, the station is part of the Adif and high-speed rail systems.

== History ==
The station was approved for its creation by Real decreto of Isabella II on 12 November 1859.

The station was opened to traffic on 15 September 1860, with the opening of the Caparroso-Pamplona section of the railway line intended to connect Zaragoza with Navarre by the Compañía del Ferrocarril de Zaragoza a Pamplona (Zaragoza-Pamplona Railway Company). This company soon merged with the Compañía del ferrocarril de Zaragoza a Barcelona (Zaragoza-Barcelona Railway Company), forming the Compañía de los Ferrocarriles de Zaragoza a Pamplona y Barcelona (Zaragoza to Pamplona and Barcelona Railway Company). On 1 April 1878, its poor financial situation forced it to accept a merger with the Compañía Norte. In 1941, the nationalization of all Iberian-gauge lines led to the integration of Norte into the newly created Renfe.

Until 1956, it served as a junction station with the Pamplona-Sangüesa railway—popularly known as "El Irati"—which connected to the station to combine passenger and freight transport between the two railways.

Since 31 December 2004, Renfe has operated the line, while ADIF owns the railway facilities.

Preceding station	Renfe Operadora	Following station
Terminus	Alvia	Tafalla towards Madrid Puerta de Atocha
Alsasua towards Hendaye	Alvia	Tafalla towards Barcelona Sants
Vitoria-Gasteiz towards A Coruña	Alvia	Tafalla towards Barcelona Sants
Vitoria-Gasteiz towards Vigo-Guixar	Alvia	Tafalla towards Barcelona Sants
Vitoria-Gasteiz towards Gijón	Alvia	Tafalla towards Barcelona Sants
Vitoria-Gasteiz Terminus	Intercity	Tafalla towards Barcelona Sants
Huarte-Araquil towards Vitoria-Gasteiz	Media Distancia 26	Cízur Mayor towards Zaragoza-Delicias
