= Logroño railway station =

Railway station in Logroño, Spain

Logroño
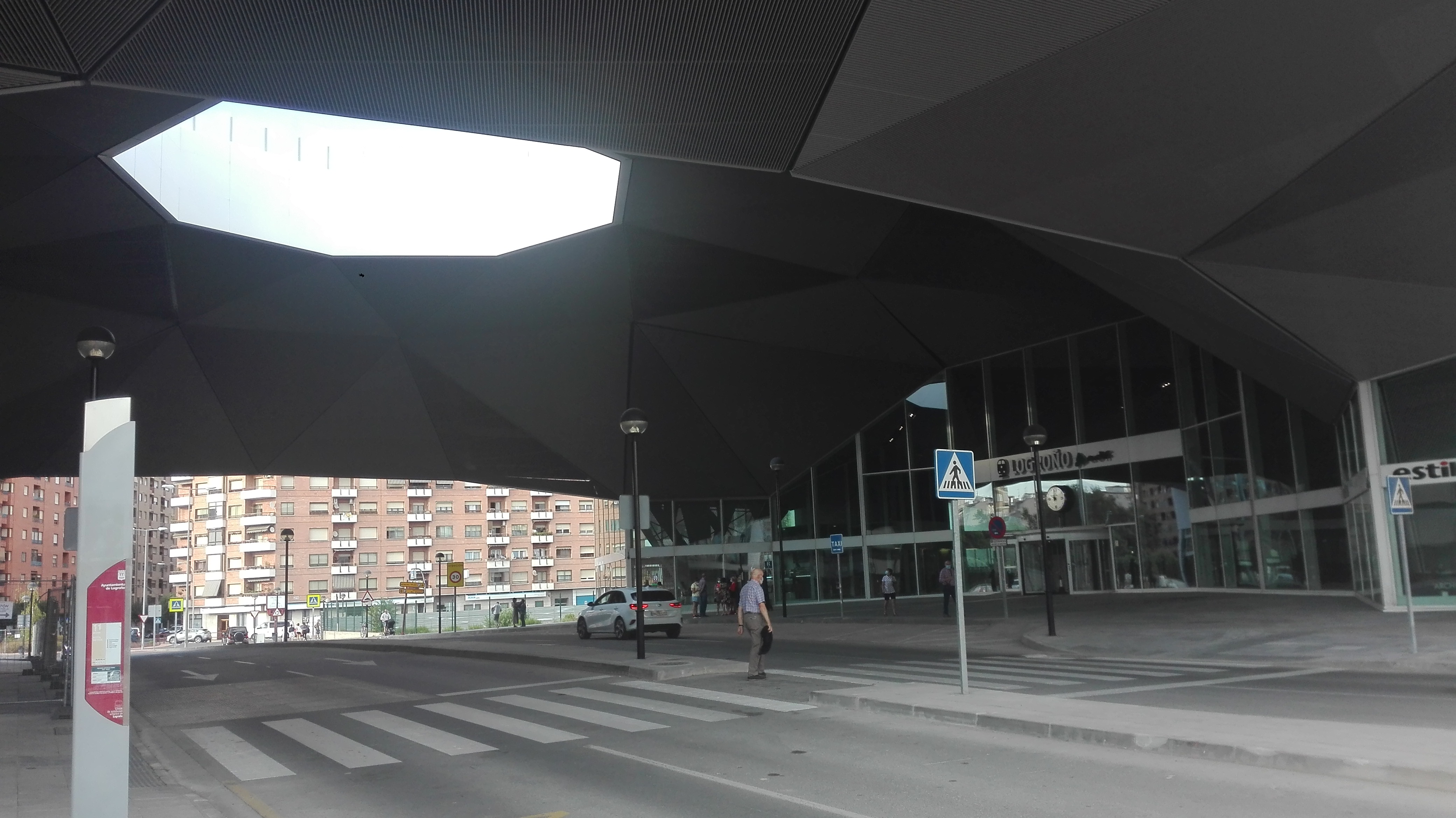

General information
- Location: Logroño; Spain
- Coordinates: 42°27′28″N 2°26′27″W
- Owner: Adif
- Operator: Renfe
- Line: Casetas–Bilbao railway

Passengers
- 2018: 308,351
Location

Logroño Railway Station (IATA: LGV) is the central railway station of Logroño, Spain. Commonly referred locally as the Renfe station, the station is part of Adif and high-speed rail systems.

== Services ==
The station accommodates RENFE long-distance and medium-distance trains (AVE). A 55 km (34 mi) high-speed spur leaves the Valladolid–Vitoria-Gasteiz extension of the Madrid–Valladolid high-speed rail line at Miranda de Ebro and continues to Logroño.

Preceding station	Renfe Operadora	Following station
Terminus	Alvia	Calahorra towards Madrid Puerta de Atocha
Haro towards Bilbao-Abando	Alvia	Calahorra towards Barcelona Sants
Burgos-Rosa de Lima towards A Coruña or Vigo-Guixar	Trenhotel Galicia	Castejón de Ebro towards Barcelona Sants
Terminus	Media Distancia 22	Recajo towards Zaragoza-Delicias
