= Estación del Norte (Zaragoza) =

Coordinates: 41.6601°N 0.8718°W

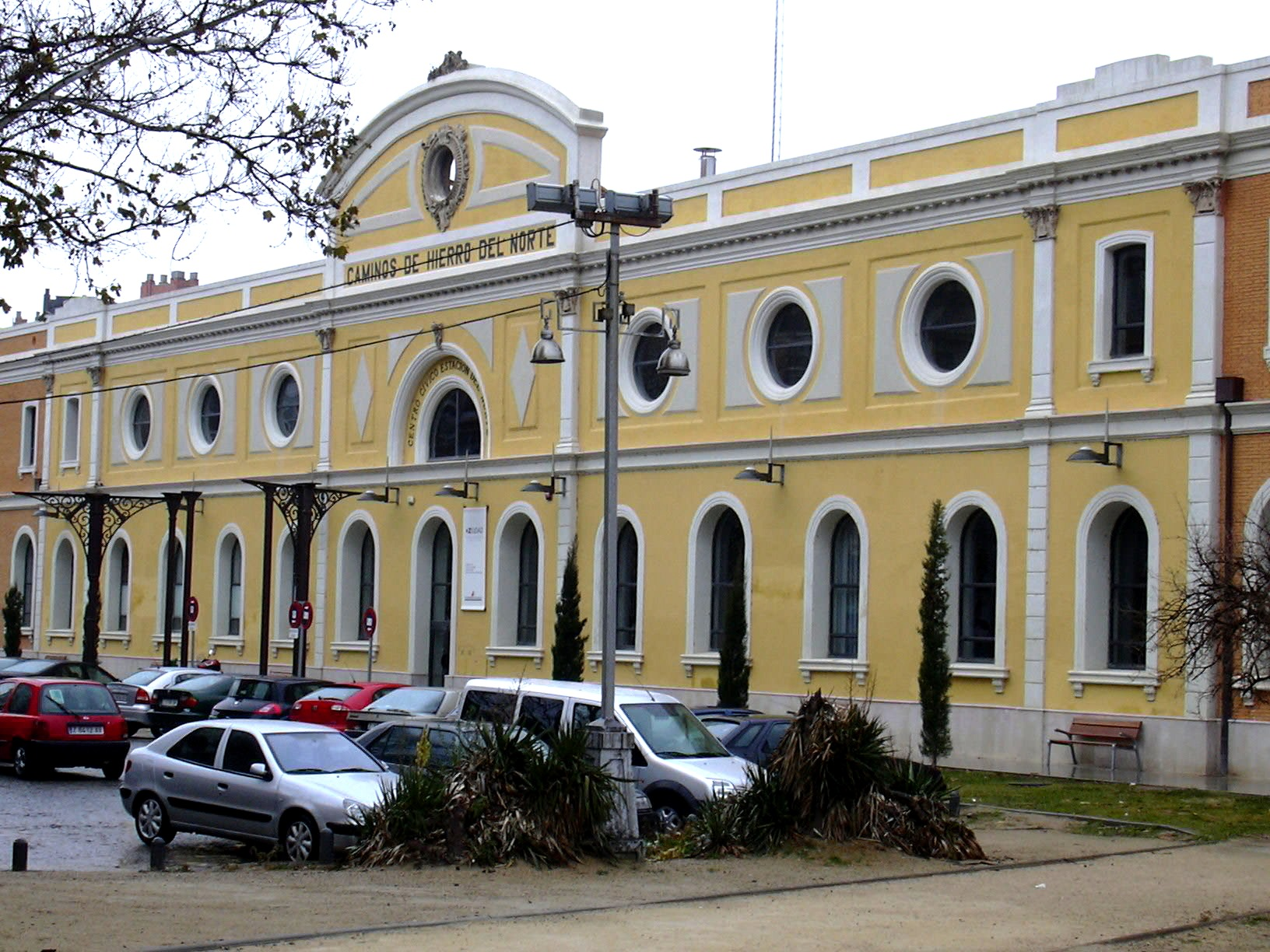
Zaragoza - Antigua Estación del Norte

Estación del Norte (Zaragoza) is a former railway station Zaragoza located in the neighborhoods of Arrabal and Jesus. The station's construction was formally begun on May 12, 1856 with General Baldomero Espartero laying the first stone. It was formally opened on 6 September 1861 in a ceremony conducted by Francisco de Asís de Borbón, the king consort of Spain.
