= Huesca railway station =

Railway station in Huesca, Aragon, Spain

Huesca
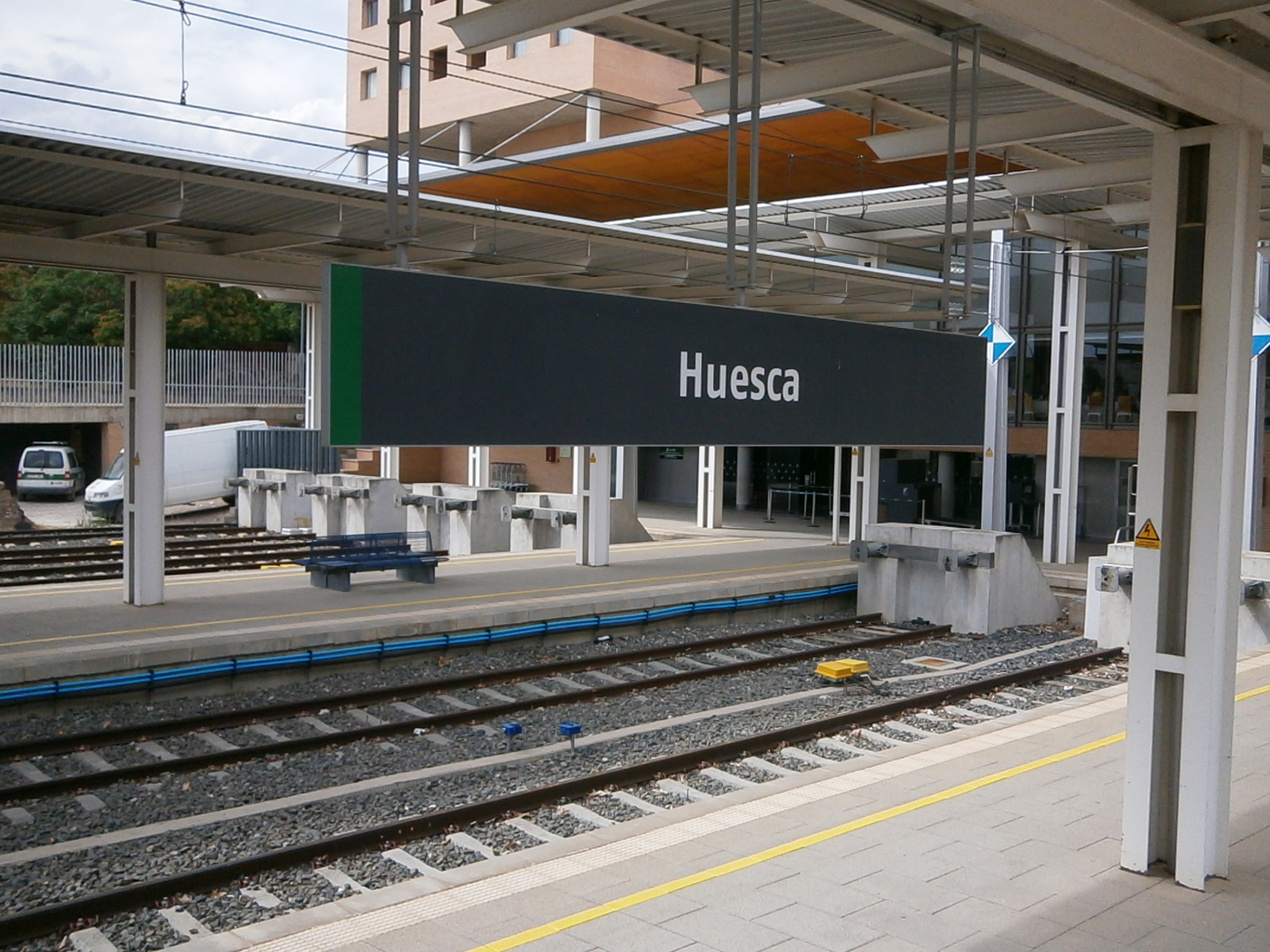

General information
- Location: C/ José Gil Cávez, 10, 22005 Huesca; Spain
- Coordinates: 42.133584°N 0.40968°W
- Elevation: 458 m (1,503 ft)
- Owner: Adif
- Operator: Renfe
- Lines: Tardienta–Canfranc (PK 21.9); Zaragoza–Huesca (high-speed) (PK 84.2)
- Platforms: 2
- Tracks: 6

History
- Opened: 2001

Passengers
- 2018: 200,752
Location
- Location within Spain

Huesca railway station serves the city of Huesca in the province of the same name, Aragon, Spain. The station is a terminus with four platforms faces and six tracks. It was opened in 2001, replacing an earlier station that had opened in 1864 along with the Zaragoza to Huesca railway. The old station was demolished not long after the opening of the new one.

In 2016, the station was used by around 150,000 passengers.

== Location ==
The station is located at kilometre point 88.536 on the line from Zaragoza to France via Canfranc, at 458 metres above sea level.

== Infrastructure ==
Until 2006, the station was the only one in Spain in which trains heading towards Canfranc and the Pyrenees had to enter the station before then reversing out again to take the junction to Canfranc, around 500 metres outside the station. In 2007, Adif finished the Huesca rail bypass. Since then, regional trains from Zaragoza to Jaca and Canfranc reverse in the station.

The station has four platform faces and six tracks:

- Two tracks for high speed AVE services, 1,435 mm (4 ft 8 1/2 in) standard gauge and electrified at 25 kV AC
- Four tracks for regional traffic, 1,668 mm (5 ft 5 21/32 in) Iberian gauge and not electrified

Although the line from Huesca to Tardienta has standard gauge tracks and is electrified at 25 kV, it is not a high speed line, and trains travel along this section at conventional speeds.

Preceding station	Renfe Operadora	Following station
Tardienta towards Madrid Puerta de Atocha	AVE	Terminus
Tardienta towards Zaragoza-Delicias	Media Distancia 56	Ayerbe towards Jaca
Tardienta towards Zaragoza-Delicias	Media Distancia 56	Plasencia del Monte towards Canfranc
