= Tudela–Bilbao railway =

Railway line in Spain

Overview
- Status: Operational
- Owner: Adif
- Termini: Tudela; Bilbao-Abando

Service
- Operator(s): Renfe

Technical
- Track gauge: 1,668 mm (5 ft 5 21/32 in) Iberian gauge

The Tudela–Bilbao railway (also known as the Casetas to Bilbao railway) is a Spanish railway from Casetas to Bilbao.

== History ==
The citizens of the city of Tudela, Navarre had planned a direct railway to Madrid in 1845, but this was not built. After the Northern Railway (Compañía del Norte) planned a railway from Madrid to Bilbao, bypassing Tudela, it was decided to build a railway to Bilbao and outline permission was granted in 1856. The necessary finance was raised and Charles Vignoles appointed Engineer. Work started in 1857 and the line completed in 1863. However the railway struggled to cover costs and declared bankrupt in 1866. The line was damaged during the Carlist War and closed from 1873 and 1875. In 1878 the railway was absorbed by the Compañía del Norte.

Beyer, Peacock & Company built forty-one 2-4-0 steam locomotives for the railway in 1861 and 1862, followed by eight 4-4-0 tank engines. One of the later tank engines is preserved outside Bilbao Abando railway station.

== Services ==
The Cercanías Bilbao commuter rail service operates to Orduña from Bilbao-Abando; along with regional services along various stretches of the line. At Casetas, the line joins the Madrid–Barcelona railway.

The line also serves as the only rail link from Bilbao to Madrid and the rest of the Spanish mainline network. Once the Basque Y opens, journey times will decrease significantly.
