= Figueres–Vilafant railway station =

Building in Girona Province, Spain

Figueres–Vilafant
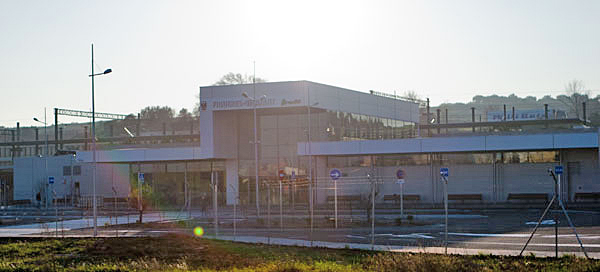
- The station building.

General information
- Location: Avinguda Puig Grau; 17740 Vilafant; Spain
- Coordinates: 42°15′56″N 2°56′32″E
- Owner: Adif
- Operator: Renfe Operadora and SNCF
- Line: Perpignan–Barcelona high-speed rail line (PK 44.4)
- Platforms: 2 island platforms
- Tracks: 7
- Connections: Local and interurban buses

Construction
- Structure type: At-grade
- Parking: A large parking is located next to the entrance. It costs €0.0182 per minute or €1.25 per hour. Max for 24 hours is €9.15. See http://www.saba.es for more details.
- Accessible: Yes

Other information
- Station code: 4307

History
- Opened: 19 December 2010

Passengers
- 2018: 608,201
Location

Figueres–Vilafant is a railway station serving the city of Figueres in Catalonia, Spain. It is located in the municipality of Vilafant, at about 2 kilometres (1.2 mi) west from its urban center and 1.5 kilometres (0.93 mi) from Figueres city centre. The station is on the Perpignan–Barcelona high-speed rail line and is served by Renfe Operadora's AVE and SNCF's TGV high-speed trains.

Opened on 19 December 2010, the station served as the terminus for both TGV trains from Paris and AVE trains from Barcelona and Madrid. From 13 December 2013 on, through services run between Paris, Lyon, Marseille and Toulouse to Barcelona and Madrid.

The station is also connected to the Spanish broad gauge railway network thanks to a branch that links it with the Barcelona–Cerbère conventional railway line near Vilamalla. This allowed broad-gauge connecting services to run between Figueres–Vilafant, Girona and Barcelona until the high speed line from Barcelona was finished and opened for commercial service on 9 January 2013.

The general plan was to move all trains for the Figueres area to this station and close the current Figueres station. This location and that the station is only accessible by one road has been the subject of some comment in the local press. Opposition to the station location as well as the eventual plan to move all train service (local, medium, and long-distance and international) to this station has forced it to be deemed a "provisional station" until the matter can be resolved.

== Services ==
Preceding station	Renfe Operadora	Following station
Girona towards Barcelona Sants	Avant	Terminus
Girona towards Madrid Puerta de Atocha	AVE	Terminus
Girona towards Barcelona Sants	AVE	Perpignan towards Lyon-Part-Dieu
Girona towards Barcelona Sants	AVE	Perpignan towards Toulouse-Matabiau
Girona towards Madrid Puerta de Atocha	AVE	Perpignan towards Marseille-St-Charles
Girona towards Madrid Puerta de Atocha	Avlo	Terminus
Preceding station	SNCF	Following station
Girona towards Barcelona Sants	TGV	Perpignan towards Paris-Lyon
