= Barcelona Sants railway station =

Railway station in Spain

Barcelona Sants
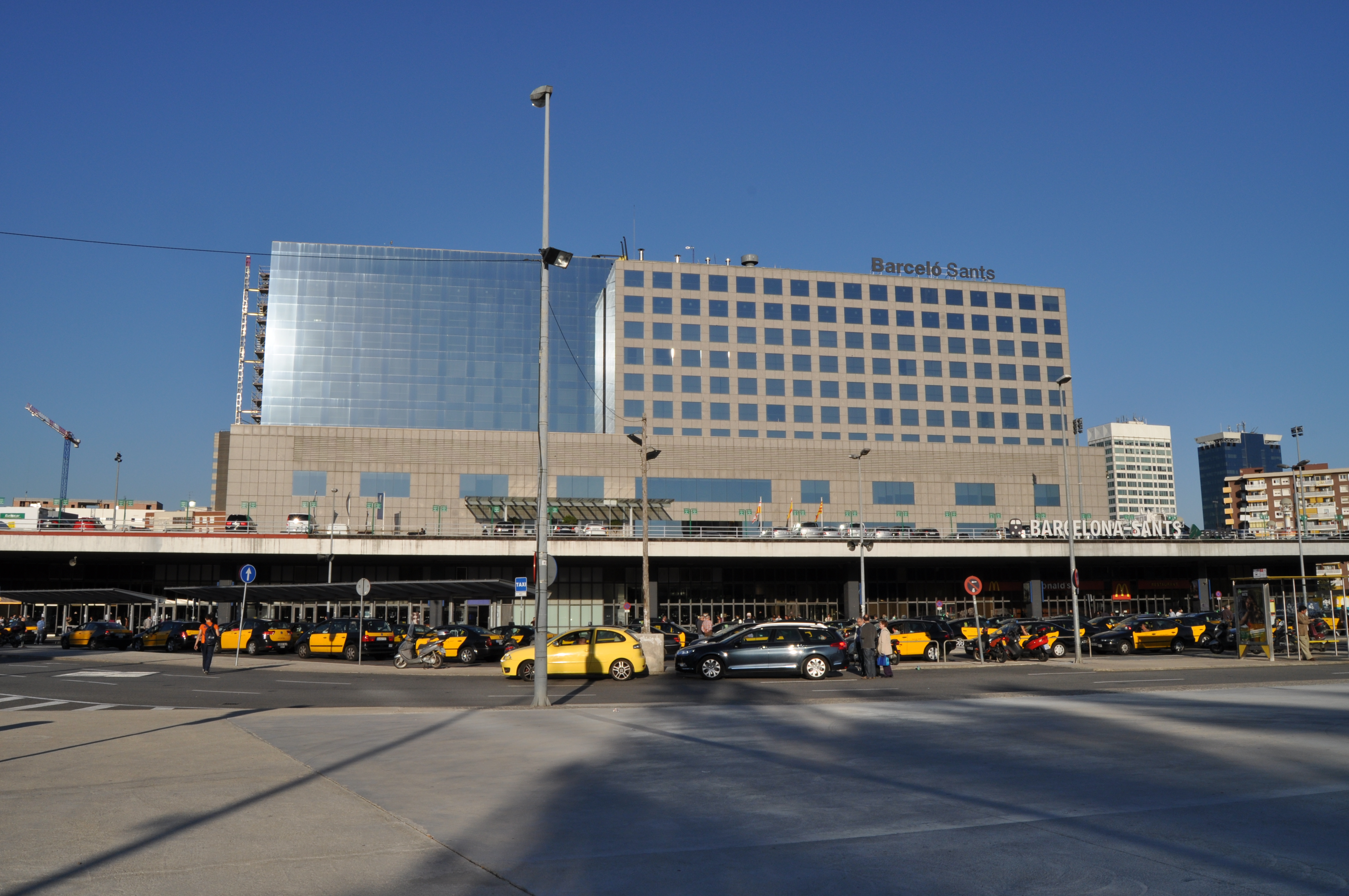
- The station's main façade in 2010

General information
- Location: Plaça dels Països Catalans; 08014 Barcelona; Spain
- Coordinates: 41°22′44″N 2°08′24″E
- Owner: Adif
- Operator: Renfe Operadora and SNCF
- Lines: Madrid–Barcelona (PK 677.9); Lleida–Manresa–Barcelona (PK 186.5); Madrid–Barcelona–Figueres (high-speed) (PK 621.0)
- Platforms: 7 island platforms
- Tracks: 14: 6 standard gauge high-speed; 8 Iberian gauge regional/local
- Connections: Barcelona Metro: at Sants Estació; Adjacent bus station; Local bus

Construction
- Structure type: Underground
- Platform levels: 2
- Parking: Adjacent parking garage.
- Accessible: Yes

Other information
- Station code: 71801 (Adif)
- IATA code: YJB

History
- Opened: 18 July 1975

Passengers
- 2018: 46,511,388 ( )
- Rank: 2

Services
Preceding station	Ouigo España	Following station
Camp de Tarragona towards Madrid Atocha	Madrid to Barcelona	Terminus
Location
- Location within Barcelona Location within Spain

Barcelona Sants (Catalan pronunciation: [bəɾsəˈlonə sans]) is the main railway station in Barcelona, owned by Adif, the railway infrastructure agency of Spain. It has become the most important transport hub of the city - being the centre of Rodalies de Catalunya including Barcelona suburban railway services and regional services, as well as the main inter-city station for national and international destinations. The station is named after Sants, the neighbourhood of Barcelona in which it is located. New parts of the station have recently been remodeled to accommodate the Spanish high-speed train AVE in the city, which started serving the city on 20 February 2008. There is also an adjacent international bus station bearing the same name, and a link to the Sants Estació metro station that serves the railway station.

== History and architectural design ==
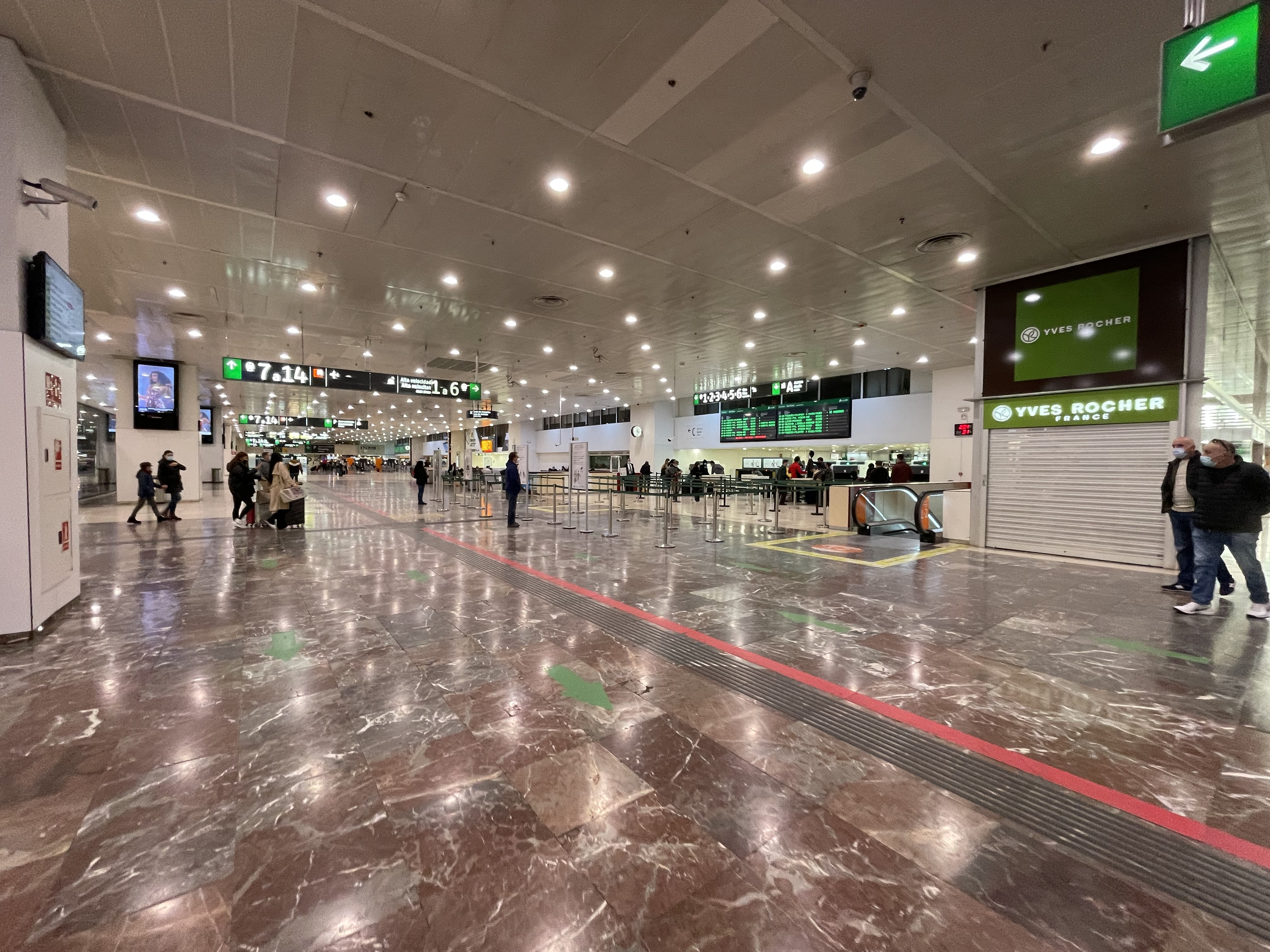
Concourse of the station.

The modern Sants station was built in the 1970s as part of construction of the second east–west regional line running under the centre of Barcelona. The first east–west railway to Estació de França terminus, more to the north, was covered up and is now also in use as a railtunnel for the regional and long-distance trains. Over the last 30 years, Estació de Sants has since eclipsed the earlier França terminus, from the 1920s, as Barcelona's main railway station.

The station was built in a modern airport style, with all of its many platforms sited underground. A hotel, Hotel Barceló Sants, occupies most of the upper floors of the station's main building.

== Location ==
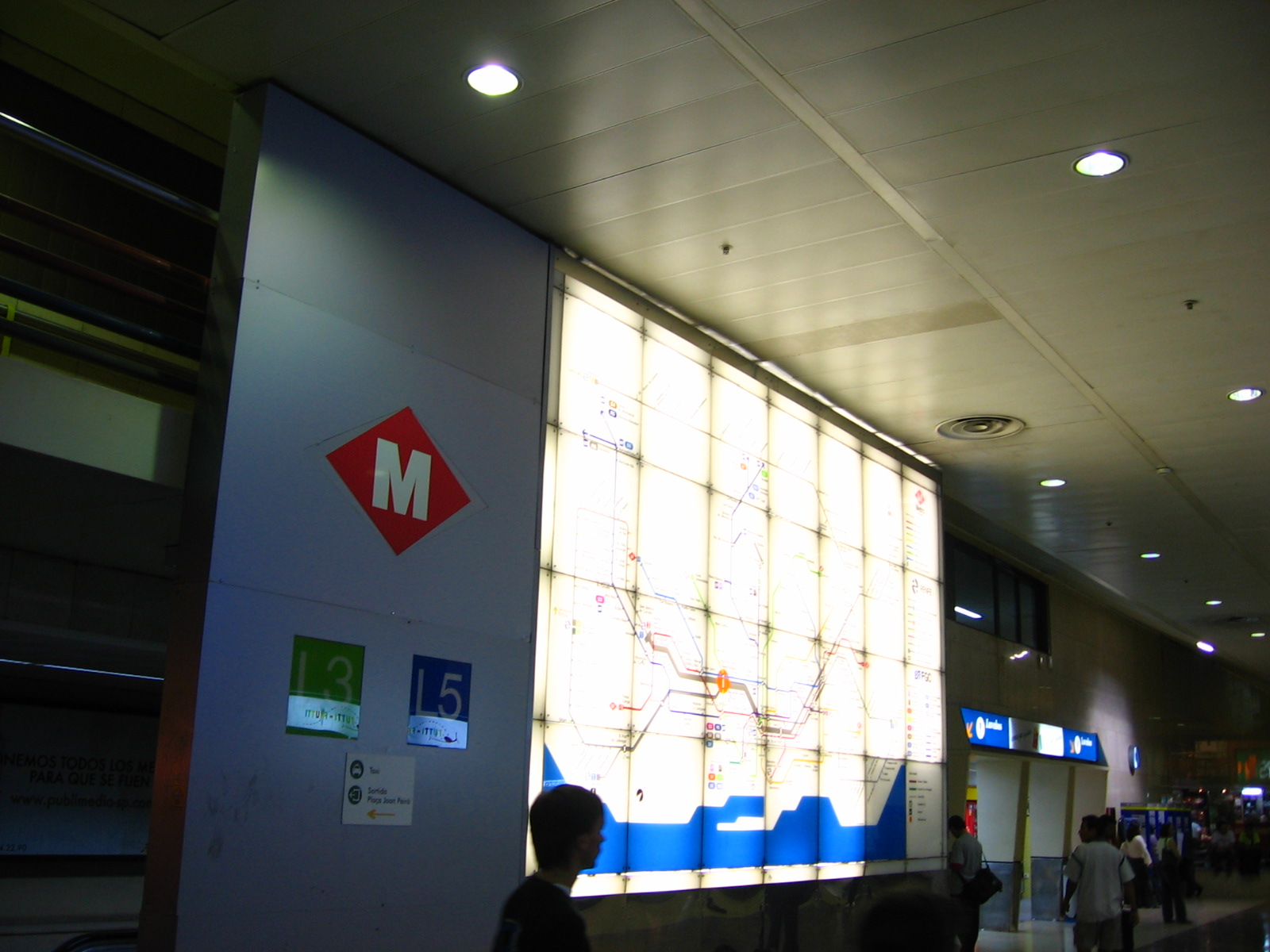
Access to the metro station from the railway station

The station is in the Sants-Montjuïc district of Barcelona, a little way to the west of the city centre, and is easily accessible via metro (see section below) or bus from anywhere in the city. Sited at the end of Avinguda Roma between two squares, Plaça dels Països Catalans and Plaça Joan Peiró, it has two entrances, one in each.

== Services ==
=== Long distance ===
Madrid is two and a half hours away on the AVE Madrid–Barcelona high-speed rail line, after the link between Camp de Tarragona and Barcelona opened in 2008. Extension of the high-speed network east into France connecting with the TGV network was completed in January 2013 upon completion of the Perpignan–Barcelona high-speed rail line and a direct TGV service started in December 2013. The high speed service uses platforms 1 to 6, which have now been converted to standard gauge for use by the AVE services, unlike the remaining 8 for other RENFE services using broader Iberian gauge tracks. A second major railway station in Barcelona, Estació de la Sagrera, currently under construction, is expected to join it in order to provide a wider access to high-speed and long-distance trains to the north of the city.

Preceding station	Renfe Operadora	Following station
Camp de Tarragona towards Madrid Puerta de Atocha	AVE	Terminus
Camp de Tarragona towards Madrid Puerta de Atocha	AVE	Girona towards Figueres-Vilafant
Camp de Tarragona towards Seville-Santa Justa	AVE	Terminus
Camp de Tarragona towards Málaga María Zambrano	AVE	Terminus
Terminus	AVE	Girona towards Lyon-Part-Dieu
Terminus	AVE	Girona towards Toulouse-Matabiau
Madrid Puerta de Atocha Terminus	AVE	Girona towards Marseille-St-Charles
Zaragoza Delicias towards Madrid Puerta de Atocha	Avlo	Terminus
Madrid Puerta de Atocha Terminus	Avlo	Terminus
Camp de Tarragona towards Madrid Puerta de Atocha	Avlo	Girona towards Figueres-Vilafant
Camp de Tarragona towards Bilbao Abando	Alvia	Terminus
Camp de Tarragona towards Hendaye	Alvia	Terminus
Camp de Tarragona towards A Coruña	Alvia	Terminus
Camp de Tarragona towards Vigo-Guixar	Alvia	Terminus
Camp de Tarragona towards Gijón	Alvia	Terminus
Camp de Tarragona towards Valencia-Joaquín Sorolla	Euromed	Terminus
Camp de Tarragona towards Alicante	Euromed	Terminus
Camp de Tarragona towards Cádiz	Intercity Torre del Oro	Terminus
Camp de Tarragona towards Alicante	Intercity	Terminus
Camp de Tarragona towards Murcia del Carmen	Intercity	Terminus
Camp de Tarragona towards Cartagena	Intercity	Terminus
Camp de Tarragona towards Lorca-Sutullena	Intercity	Terminus
Camp de Tarragona towards Seville-Santa Justa	Intercity	Terminus
Preceding station	SNCF	Following station
Terminus	TGV	Girona towards Paris-Lyon
Preceding station	Ouigo España	Following station
Camp de Tarragona towards Madrid Puerta de Atocha	Madrid to Barcelona	Terminus
Preceding station	Iryo	Following station
Camp de Tarragona towards Madrid Puerta de Atocha	Madrid to Barcelona	Terminus

=== Regional and commuter rail ===
Preceding station	Renfe Operadora	Following station
Camp de Tarragona towards Lleida Pirineus	Avant	Terminus
Camp de Tarragona towards Tortosa	Avant	Terminus
Terminus	Avant	Girona towards Figueres-Vilafant
Camp de Tarragona towards Valladolid-Campo Grande	Intercity	Terminus
Camp de Tarragona towards Pamplona	Intercity	Terminus
Sant Vicenç de Calders towards Valencia Nord	Intercity	Barcelona Passeig de Gràcia towards Barcelona Estació de França
Sant Vicenç de Calders towards Zaragoza–Delicias	Media Distancia 34	Barcelona Passeig de Gràcia towards Barcelona Estació de França
Preceding station	Rodalies de Catalunya	Following station
L'Hospitalet de Llobregat towards Molins de Rei	R1	Barcelona Plaça de Catalunya towards Maçanet-Massanes
Bellvitge towards Castelldefels	R2	Barcelona Passeig de Gràcia towards Granollers Centre
Bellvitge towards Barcelona–El Prat Airport	R2 Nord	Barcelona Passeig de Gràcia towards Maçanet-Massanes
Bellvitge towards Sant Vicenç de Calders	R2 Sud	Barcelona Passeig de Gràcia towards Barcelona Estació de França
L'Hospitalet de Llobregat Terminus	R3	Barcelona Plaça de Catalunya towards Latour-de-Carol-Enveitg
L'Hospitalet de Llobregat towards Sant Vicenç de Calders	R4	Barcelona Plaça de Catalunya towards Manresa
L'Hospitalet de Llobregat Terminus	RG1	Barcelona Plaça de Catalunya towards Portbou
Terminus	R11	Barcelona Passeig de Gràcia towards Cerbère
L'Hospitalet de Llobregat Terminus	R12	Barcelona Plaça de Catalunya towards Lleida Pirineus
Gavà towards Lleida Pirineus	R13	Barcelona Passeig de Gràcia towards Barcelona Estació de França
Gavà towards Lleida Pirineus	R14	Barcelona Passeig de Gràcia towards Barcelona Estació de França
Bellvitge towards Riba-roja d'Ebre	R15	Barcelona Passeig de Gràcia towards Barcelona Estació de França
Vilanova i la Geltrú towards Ulldecona-Alcanar-La Sénia or Tortosa	R16	Barcelona Passeig de Gràcia towards Barcelona Estació de França
Vilanova i la Geltrú towards Port Aventura	R17	Barcelona Passeig de Gràcia towards Barcelona Estació de França
Suspended
Bellvitge towards Barcelona–El Prat Airport	R10	Barcelona Passeig de Gràcia towards Barcelona Estació de França
