= Jerez de la Frontera railway station =

Railway station in Spain

Jerez de la Frontera
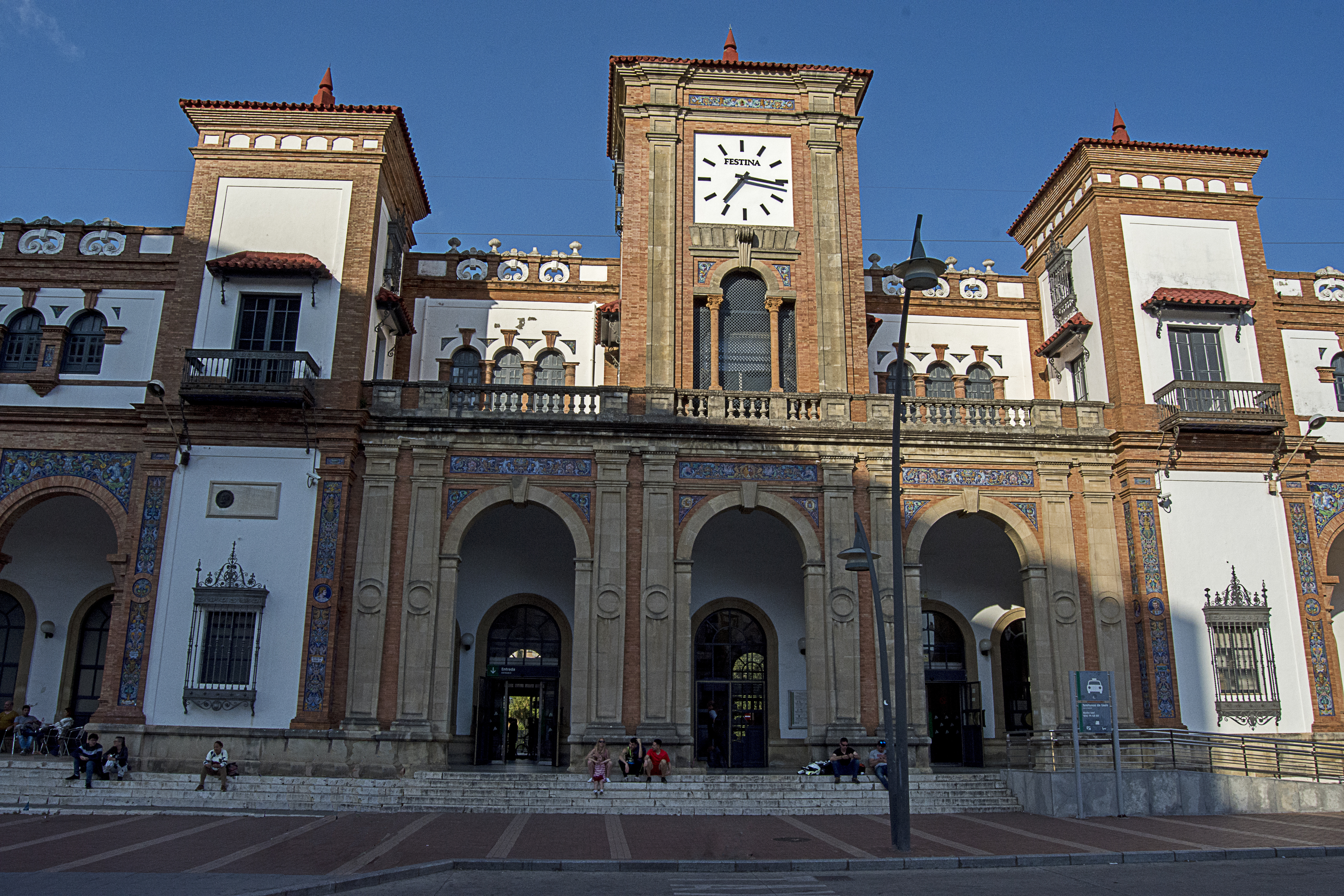
- Main façade

General information
- Location: Jerez de la Frontera, Andalusia, Spain
- Coordinates: 36.6800°N 6.1266°W
- Owner: Adif
- Operator: Renfe
- Line: Alcázar de San Juan–Cádiz railway

History
- Opened: 1854

Passengers
- 2024: 1,912,875
Location

Jerez de la Frontera railway station, is the main railway station of the Spanish city of Jerez de la Frontera, Andalusia. It opened in 1854 and served over 1.9 million passengers in 2024, a figure similar to 2018, a year in which 592,000 of whom were Cercanías Cádiz passengers.

== Services ==
Alvia services use the Madrid–Seville high-speed rail line as far as Seville-Santa Justa, and switches to the conventional rail network to serve Jerez and finally Cádiz, and one Media Distancia service between Cádiz and Jaén calls at Jerez. The Cercanías Cádiz commuter rail line also serves the station.

Preceding station	Renfe Operadora	Following station
Seville-Santa Justa towards Madrid Puerta de Atocha	Alvia	El Puerto de Santa María towards Cádiz
Seville-Santa Justa towards Santander	Alvia	El Puerto de Santa María towards Cádiz
Seville-Santa Justa towards Gijón	Alvia	El Puerto de Santa María towards Cádiz
Lebrija towards Seville-Santa Justa	Media Distancia 65	El Puerto de Santa María towards Cádiz
Preceding station	Cercanías Cádiz	Following station
El Puerto de Santa María towards Cádiz	C-1	Aeropuerto de Jerez Terminus
