= Cádiz Bay tram-train =

Transport system in Cádiz, Spain

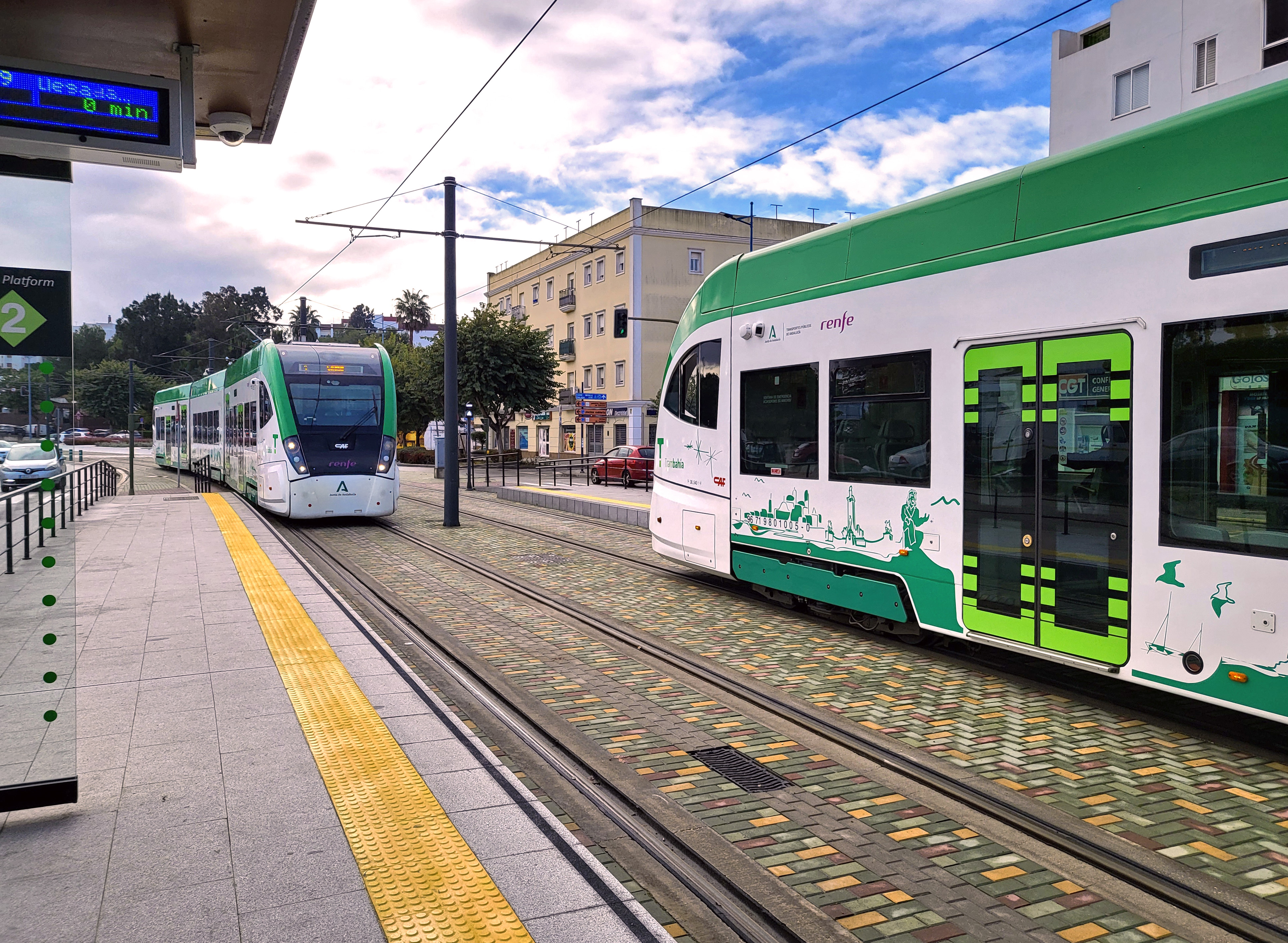
- Tram-trains stopping at Reyes Católicos station

Overview
- Native name: Tranvía Metropolitano de la Bahía de Cádiz
- Locale: Cádiz, San Fernando and Chiclana de la Frontera, Spain
- Transit type: Light rail Tram-train
- Number of lines: 1
- Number of stations: 21
- Daily ridership: 5.920 (2024)
- Annual ridership: 2.1 million (2024)
- Website: https://www.trambahia.es/

Operation
- Began operation: 26 October 2022
- Operator: Renfe

Technical
- System length: 24 km (14.9 mi)
- Track gauge: 1,668 mm (5 ft 5 21/32 in) Iberian gauge

The Cádiz Bay tram-train, popularly known as Trambahía, is a tram-train/light rail system in the Spanish city of Cádiz and the surrounding area. The 24 km (14.9 mi) system opened on 26 October 2022.

It is the fourth metropolitan light rail system to be built in Andalusia, after Seville Metro (2009), Málaga Metro (2014) and Granada Metro (2017). It is also the fourth by number of passengers carried - over 2.1 million in 2024.

According to the European Commission, the tram-train service is expected to reduce CO_{2} emissions by 7,000 tonnes each year, in addition to the projected 97% reduction in traffic injuries and a 75% drop in road deaths.

== History ==
Construction on the system began on 1 September 2008, but was halted due to the 2008–2014 Spanish financial crisis. The inaugural line would use the existing Alcázar de San Juan–Cádiz railway as far as La Ardila sharing stations with the Cercanías Cádiz commuter rail line, then transfer to a new tramway through to Chiclana de la Frontera; the first example of its kind in Spain, where trams use main-line railways.

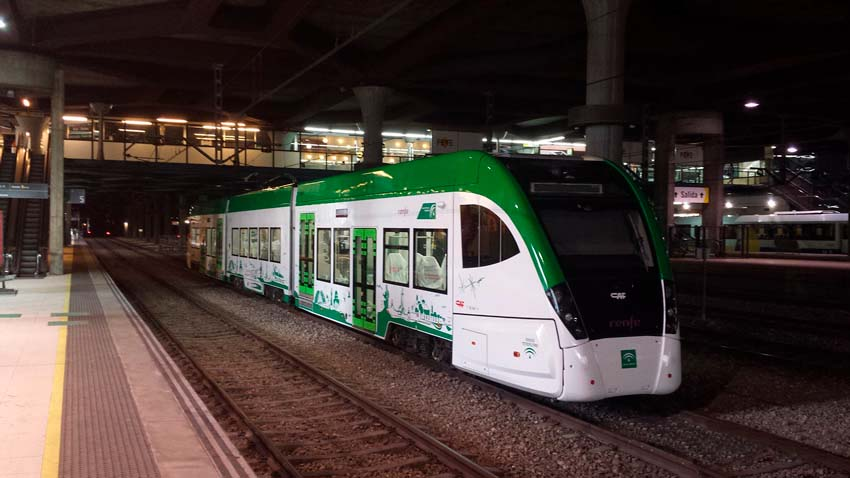
A unit of the Cádiz train-tram at the Oviedo station during the homologation tests carried out in April 2014.

The first completed units of the train-tram, which left CAF's facilities for the first time on 24 April 2012, were carrying out homologation tests in northern Spain. Between 2012 and 2014 CAF carried out tests with the train-trams between the stations of Irun and Alsasua. Later they moved to the surroundings of the Oviedo station.

In November 2014, the Andalusian government announced the arrival of the first unit in the province of Cádiz in order to carry out dynamic tests in the part of the route that was already completed. Thus, on 17 November 2014, the tram circulated for the first time between the stations of Ardila and Pinar de los Franceses, completing the route satisfactorily. The tests lasted throughout the entire week.

=== Test circulation and inauguration ===
Map of Trambahía

On 11 February 2022, for the first time, an 801 unit travelled the entire 24-kilometre route and 21 stops of the Tramway of the Bay, from the Pelagatos depot (Chiclana de la Frontera) to the Cádiz station. That same day, after this milestone, the Public Works Agency and Renfe announced that, before its entry into commercial service, scheduled for 26 October 2022, the blank tests were carried out, the robustness tests and, finally, the business simulations.

Finally, on 21 October 2022, the Andalusian government announced that the inauguration of the system would take place five days later. The first service ran on 26 October, more than 16 years after the works began.

== Infrastructure ==
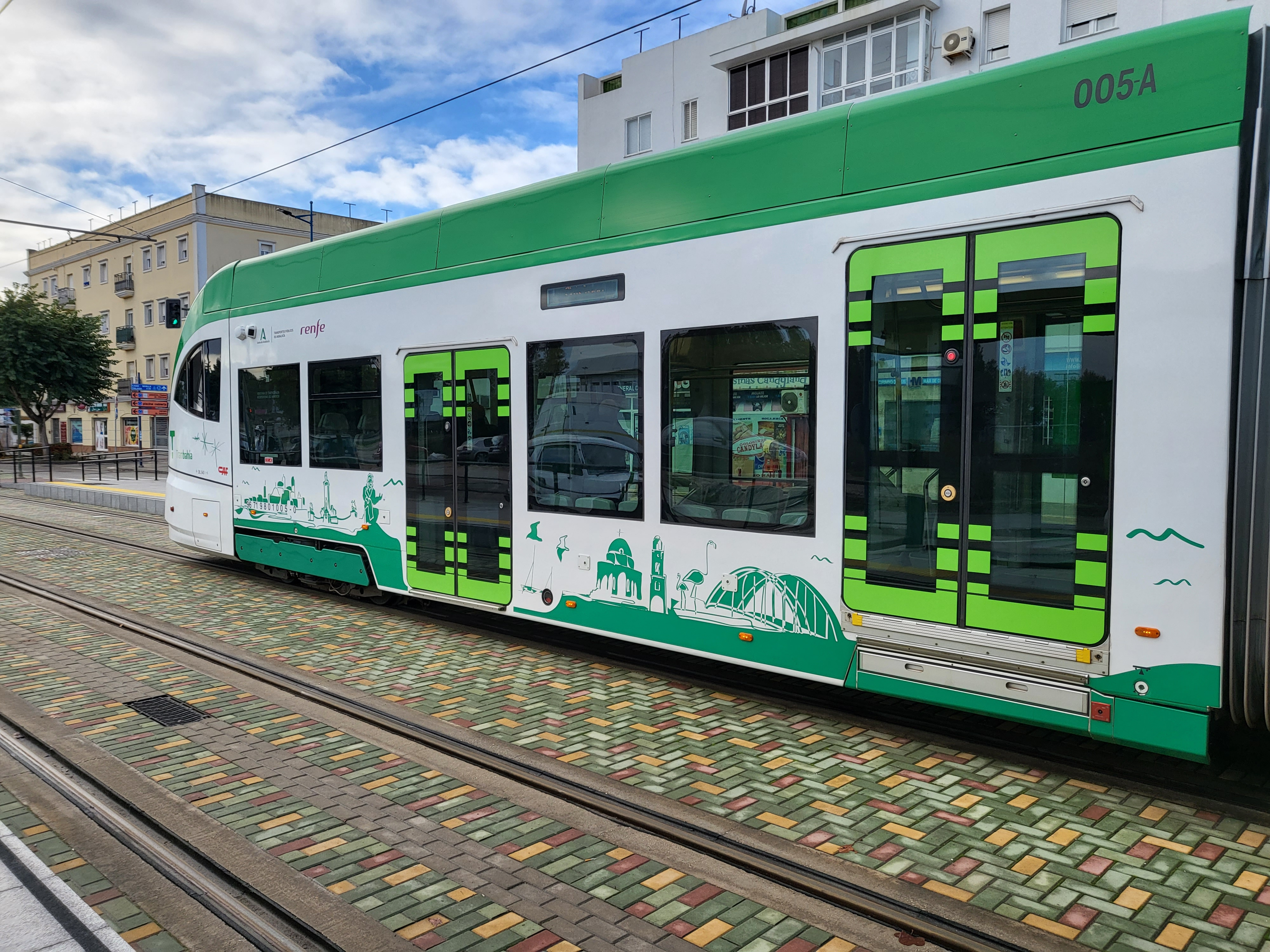
A unit at Reyes Católicos station. Note the two different door heights.

As of March 2025, the system consists of a single 24-kilometre-long (15 mi) tram-train line, numbered T-1, between Cádiz's railway station and the municipality of Chiclana de la Frontera via the town of San Fernando. The system operates at a maximum speed of 100 km/h. The 10.6-kilometre-long (6.6 mi) section between Cádiz and Río Arillo station shares tracks with the heavy-rail Alcázar de San Juan–Cádiz railway; the intermediate stations along this stretch are served by both the tram-train and Cádiz's suburban rail services. On the other hand, the section east of Río Arillo station functions like a typical tram line, with vehicles operating at street level.

As a result of this arrangement, the stations on the route have two different platform heights, with the platforms on the tram-like section being kerb-height and those along the railway sitting much higher. Because of this, the seven CAF Urbos TT vehicles that operate on the route have two types of doors – one for each of the two platform heights – and only the corresponding doors are opened at each station.

The line is mostly double-track, except for two single-track sections within Chiclana de la Frontera (one in its town centre, between Alameda Solano and Reyes Católicos stops, and one at the eastern end, between La Hoya and Pelagatos) and two very short interlaced sections within San Fernando, either side of the Plaza del Carmen stop. The line currently uses the Iberian track gauge (1,668 mm), although it has been futureproofed for a possible conversion to standard gauge (1,435 mm); this is because there are long-term plans to convert the heavy-rail line between Sevilla and Cádiz to this gauge as well.

The junction station at Río Arillo is unusual in that there is no public access into or out of it (although there is an emergency exit onto the adjacent road) – the station exists only to allow passengers to change between the tram-train and the suburban rail services.

== Service pattern ==
On weekdays, services on the line run approximately every 30 minutes each way between Pelagatos (at the eastern end of the line) and Río Arillo stations. In general, only alternate services run to and from Cádiz itself, giving it an approximately hourly direct frequency – although the services that terminate/start at Río Arillo are also timed to connect with the suburban services for onward travel to/from Cádiz.

On Saturdays and Sundays the frequency is hourly throughout the route.

== Future extensions ==
The route at its Cádiz end is expected to be extended beyond its current terminus at the railway station, running deeper into the city centre to terminate at the bus station at Plaza de España.

In addition, there are proposals to construct a second line, the T-2, this time linking Cádiz with the northern cities of the Cádiz Bay. This line would start in Cádiz railway station (or at the aforementioned Plaza de España if that section is built), then it would immediately head east, crossing the Constitution of 1812 Bridge to serve the western areas of Puerto Real. Then, it would take over the university branch of the suburban services before rejoining the mainline railway to serve El Puerto de Santa María, Jerez de la Frontera and Jerez Airport.
