= Ciudad Real railway station =

Railway station in Castilla–La Mancha, Spain

Ciudad Real
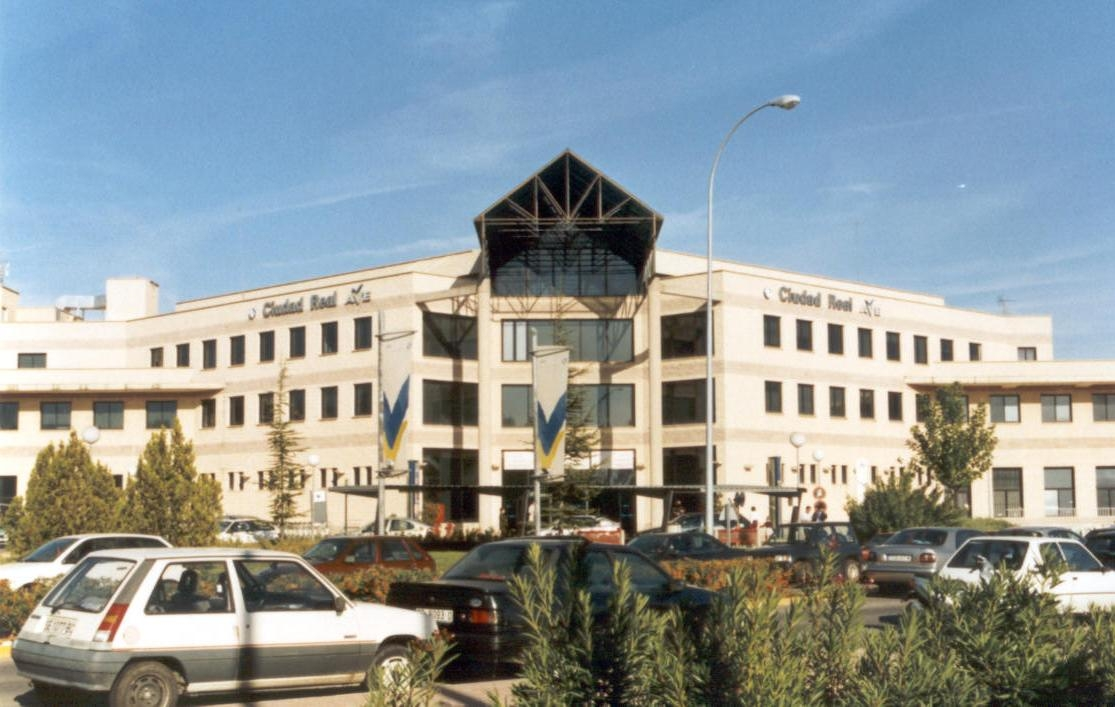

General information
- Coordinates: 38.9848°N 3.9132°W
- Owner: Adif
- Operator: Renfe
- Lines: Madrid–Seville high-speed rail line; Ciudad Real-Badajoz railway

Passengers
- 2018: 1,298,894
Location

Ciudad Real railway station (Spanish: Estación de Ciudad Real) is the main railway station of the Spanish city of Ciudad Real, Castilla–La Mancha. Located on the AVE high-speed rail line from Madrid Atocha to Seville-Santa Justa and Málaga María Zambrano, travel to Madrid can be achieved in under an hour.

== History ==
The station was built in 1992 with the arrival of the AVE line, over the site of an older station which originally opened in 1880. The arrival of the high-speed line to Ciudad Real has been credited with revitalising the city due to the short travel time to Madrid.

== Services ==
Along with aforementioned AVE services to Madrid, Seville and Málaga; Alvia trains operate on from Madrid on the high-speed line and continuing on the classic Iberian gauge tracks to Cádiz, stopping at Ciudad Real. Altaria services operate between Madrid Atocha and Algeciras stopping at Ciudad Real, and Media Distancia trains to Alicante, Villena and Alcázar de San Juan.

Preceding station	Renfe Operadora	Following station
Madrid Puerta de Atocha Terminus	AVE	Puertollano towards Seville-Santa Justa
Madrid Puerta de Atocha Terminus	AVE	Puertollano towards Málaga María Zambrano
Zaragoza-Delicias towards Barcelona Sants	AVE	Puertollano towards Seville-Santa Justa
Zaragoza-Delicias towards Barcelona Sants	AVE	Córdoba towards Málaga María Zambrano
Cuenca-Fernando Zóbel towards Valencia-Joaquín Sorolla	AVE	Puertollano towards Seville-Santa Justa
Madrid Puerta de Atocha Terminus	Alvia	Puertollano towards Cádiz
Madrid Puerta de Atocha towards Santander	Alvia	Puertollano towards Cádiz
Madrid Puerta de Atocha towards Gijón	Alvia	Puertollano towards Cádiz
Madrid Puerta de Atocha Terminus	Intercity	Puertollano towards Algeciras
Almagro towards Alicante	Media Distancia 45	Terminus
Almagro towards Madrid Chamartín	Media Distancia 58	Terminus
Almagro towards Alcázar de San Juan	Media Distancia 60	Puertollano towards Badajoz
Madrid Puerta de Atocha Terminus	Avant 85	Puertollano Terminus
