= Madrid Atocha railway station =

Railway station in Madrid, Spain

Madrid Atocha
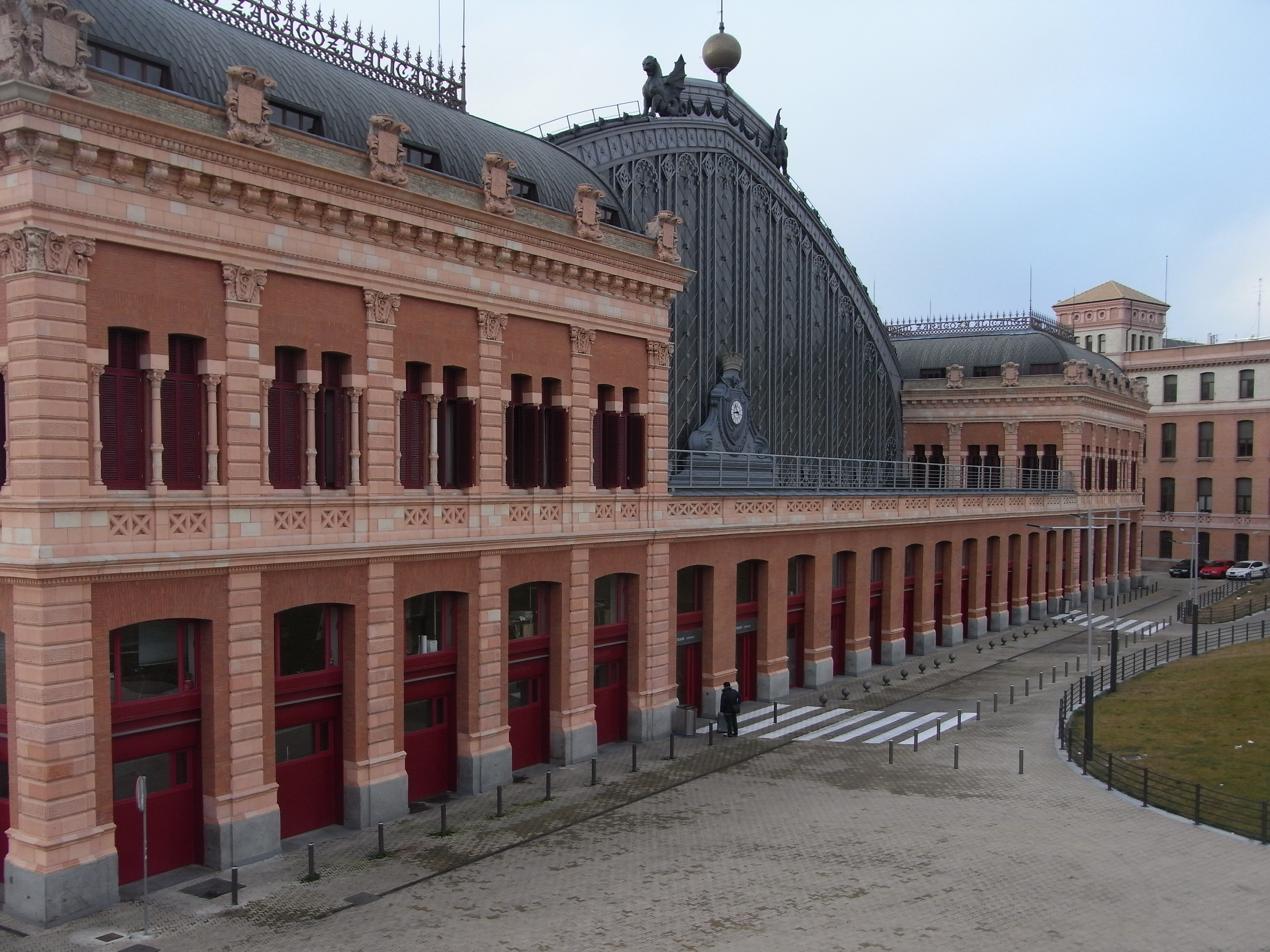

General information
- Location: Plaza Del Emperador Carlos V, Arganzuela, 28045 Madrid; Spain
- Coordinates: 40.4065°N 3.6893°W
- Owner: Adif
- Operator: Renfe
- Lines: From Puerta de Atocha: Madrid–Seville (high-speed) (PK 0.0); Madrid–Levante (high-speed) (PK 0.0); Madrid–Barcelona–Figueres (high-speed) (PK 0.0); Madrid–Málaga (high-speed) (PK 0.0); Madrid–Granada (high-speed) (PK 0.0); From Atocha–Cercanias: Madrid–Almería; Madrid–Badajoz; Madrid–Barcelona; Madrid–Jaén; Madrid–Móstoles-El Soto; Madrid–Valencia; Madrid–Valencia de Alcántara (Portuguese border)
- Tracks: 24

Other information
- Fare zone: A

History
- Opened: 9 February 1851; 175 years ago

Passengers
- 2017: 110 million
- Rank: 1

Services
Preceding station	Renfe Operadora	Following station
Terminus	AVE	Guadalajara–Yebes towards Marseille-St-Charles
Preceding station	Ouigo España	Following station
Terminus	Madrid to Barcelona	Zaragoza–Delicias towards Barcelona Sants
Preceding station	Madrid Metro	Following station
Estación del Arte towards Pinar de Chamartín	Line 1	Menéndez Pelayo towards Valdecarros
Location
- Location within Madrid

Madrid Atocha (Spanish: Estación de Madrid Atocha) is the oldest major railway station complex in Madrid. The complex includes the main train station named Madrid Puerta de Atocha-Almudena Grandes. It is the largest station serving commuter trains (Cercanías), regional trains from the south and southeast, intercity trains from Navarre, Cádiz and Huelva (Andalusia) and La Rioja, and the AVE high speed trains from Girona, Tarragona and Barcelona (Catalonia), Huesca and Zaragoza (Aragon), Sevilla, Córdoba, Málaga and Granada (Andalusia), Valencia, Castellón and Alicante (Levante Region). These train services are run by Spain's national rail company, Renfe. As of 2019, the station has daily service to Marseille, France.

== Overview ==
The station is in the Atocha neighborhood of the district of Arganzuela. The original façade faces Plaza del Emperador Carlos V, a site at which a variety of streets converge, including the Calle de Atocha, Paseo del Prado, Paseo de la Infanta Isabel, Avenida de la Ciudad de Barcelona, Calle de Méndez Álvaro, Paseo de las Delicias, Paseo de Santa María de la Cabeza, and Ronda de Atocha.

Atocha station is a railway complex, formed by the Madrid Atocha Cercanías and Madrid Puerta de Atocha stations of Spain's national railways and a station of the Madrid underground called Atocha-RENFE. RENFE is the state-owned company which operates freight and passenger trains since 1941.

== History ==
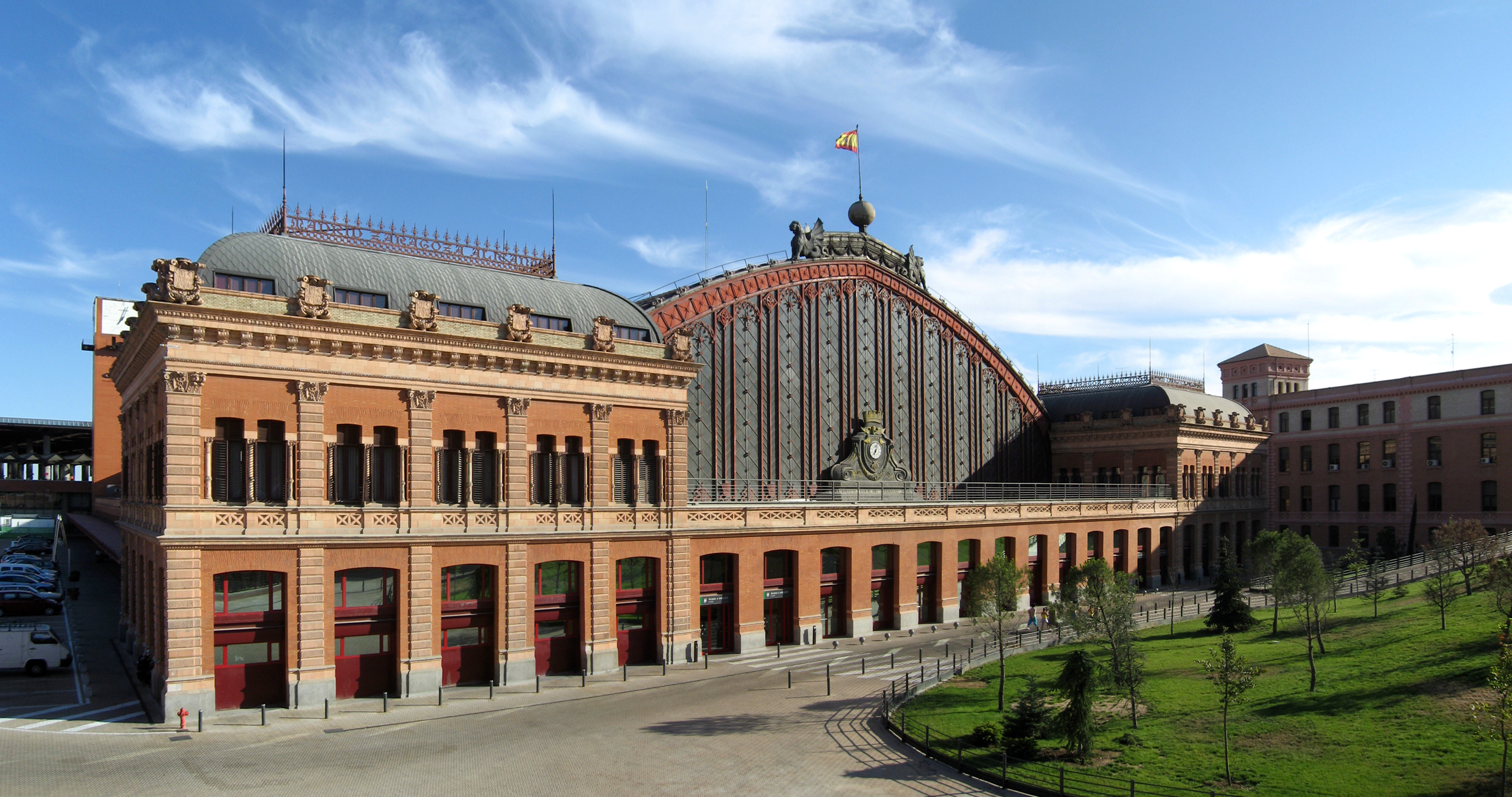
Exterior of old Atocha station

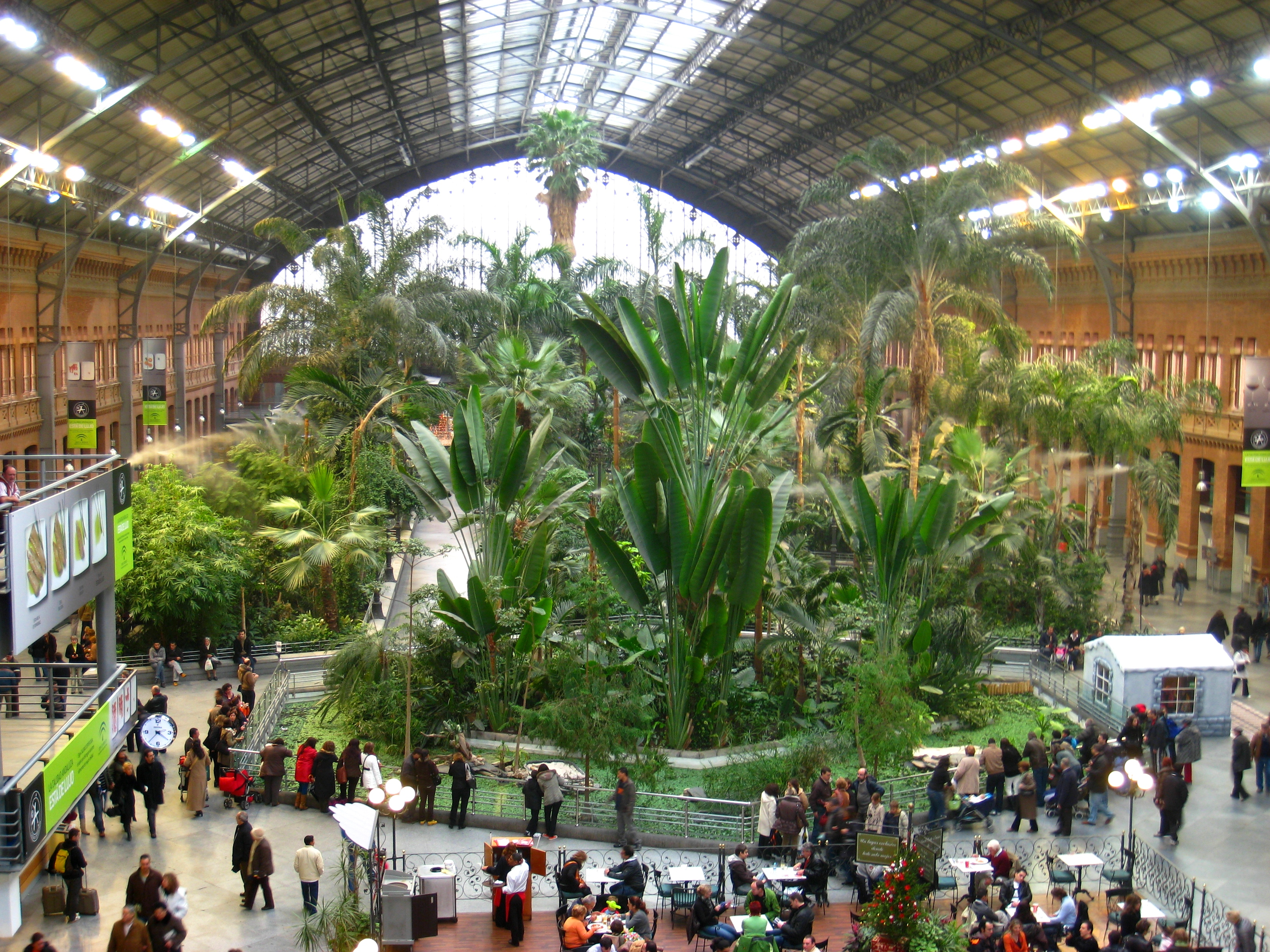
Interior plaza in old Atocha station

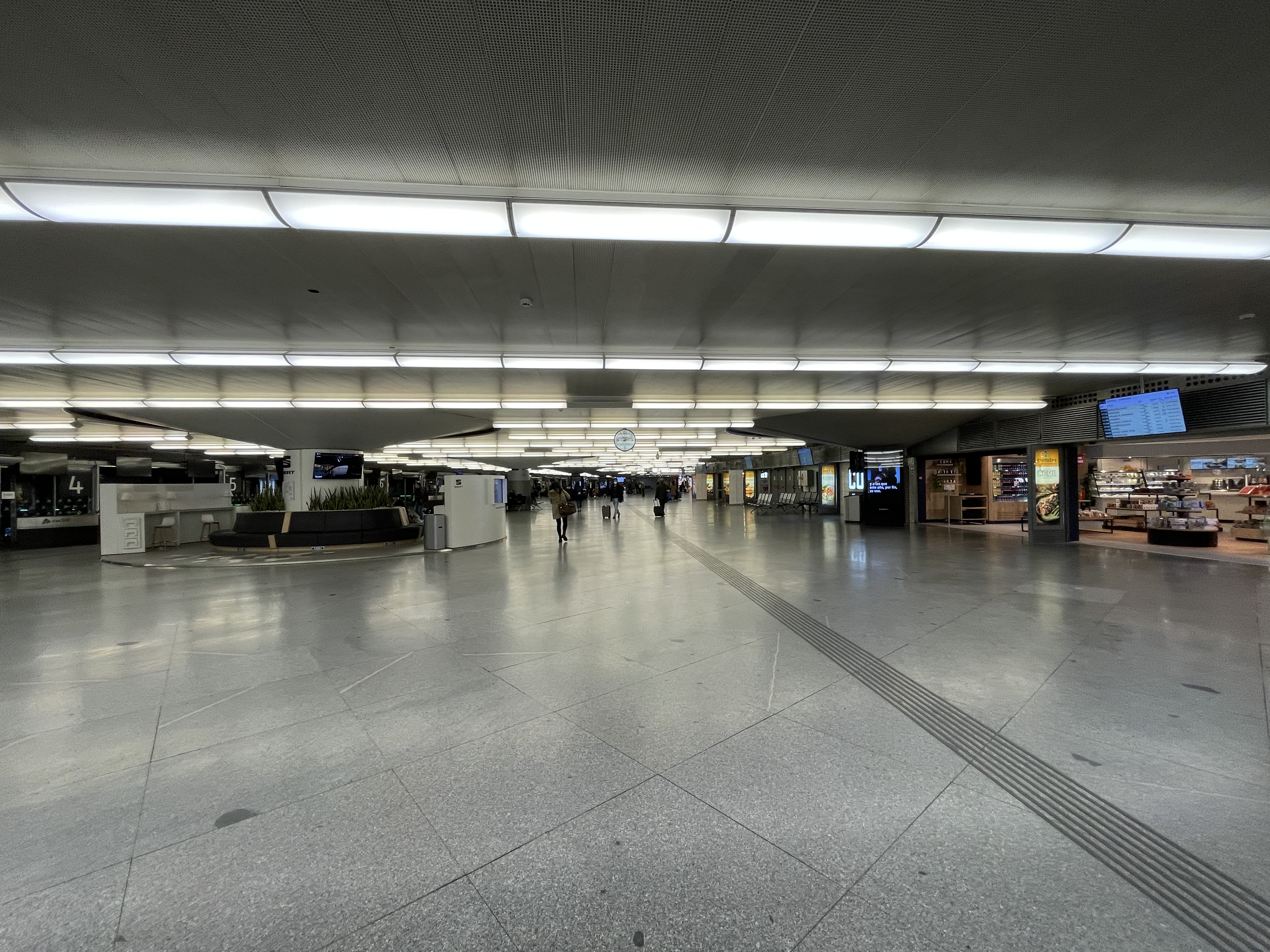
High-speed train departure concourse at the new Atocha Station.

At this site, Madrid's first railway station was inaugurated on 9 February 1851 under the name Estación de Mediodía (Atocha-Mediodía is now the name of an area of the Arganzuela district, and means south in old Spanish).

After the building was largely destroyed by fire, it was rebuilt by the MZA railway company and reopened in 1892. The architect for the replacement, in a wrought iron renewal style was Alberto de Palacio Elissague, who collaborated with Gustave Eiffel. Engineer Henry Saint James also took part in the project. The name Atocha has become attached to the station because of the nearby basilica dedicated to Our Lady of Atocha. The train platforms were partly covered by a roof in the form of inverted hull with a height of approximately 27 meters and length of 157 meters. The steel and glass roof spreads between two brick flanking buildings.

This complex of railway tracks expanded through the years. In 1985, a project of complete remodeling began, based on designs by Rafael Moneo. In 1992, the original building was taken out of service as a terminal, and converted into a concourse with shops, cafés, and a nightclub. Like the Orsay Museum in Paris, the concourse has been given a new function, that being in the case of Atocha a stunning 4,000 m^{2} (43,056 sq ft) covered tropical garden.

A modern terminal was also designed by Moneo, and built in adjacent land to serve both the new High Speed trains, regional and local commuter lines. The main lines end in the new terminal; regional and commuter train platforms are located underground, at the ingress to a rail tunnel extending northward under the Paseo de la Castellana. The station is served by two Madrid Metro stations, Estación del Arte (located near the Museo Reina Sofía) and the Atocha Renfe metro station. The latter was added when the new terminal building was constructed and is directly linked to the railway station, providing access to Line 1. A connection to Line 11 will be constructed in the first half of the 2020s, with work scheduled to begin in November 2022 for completion by the end of 2026.

On 19 December 2021, the regional government of the Community of Madrid announced that Atocha Renfe station would be renamed "Atocha", owing to the liberalization of Spain's railway industry and the entry of new rail companies into the Spanish market. The station was originally set to be renamed "Atocha-Constitución del 78" (Atocha-Constitution of '78), announced by Vice President Ignacio Aguado on 16 February 2021, and proposed by Citizens (Cs), his political party, but was halted after Cs lost all its seats in the Assembly of Madrid in the aftermath of the 2021 Madrilenian regional election. The name change, which entailed replacing signage, updating maps and modifying station announcements, took effect on 1 February 2022. The following month on 3 March 2022 the Spanish central government announced a second name change to rename Puerta de Atocha after writer Almudena Grandes, who died four months earlier, with the name change taking effect on 19 November 2022.

The Spanish central government approved a €500 million expansion of Puerta de Atocha station on 13 June 2023 which would entail the construction of a new four-track underground station with two through platforms for high-speed services, allowing high-speed trains to serve both Atocha and Chamartín, the renovation of the existing station building and the construction of a new southern vestibule along the Calle de Méndez Álvaro.

== 2004 Madrid train bombings ==
On 11 March 2004, packed arriving commuter trains were bombed in a series of coordinated attacks, killing 193 people and wounding 1,800. The official investigation by the Spanish Judiciary determined the attacks were directed by a Islamist terrorist cell.

== Memorials to the 2004 attacks ==
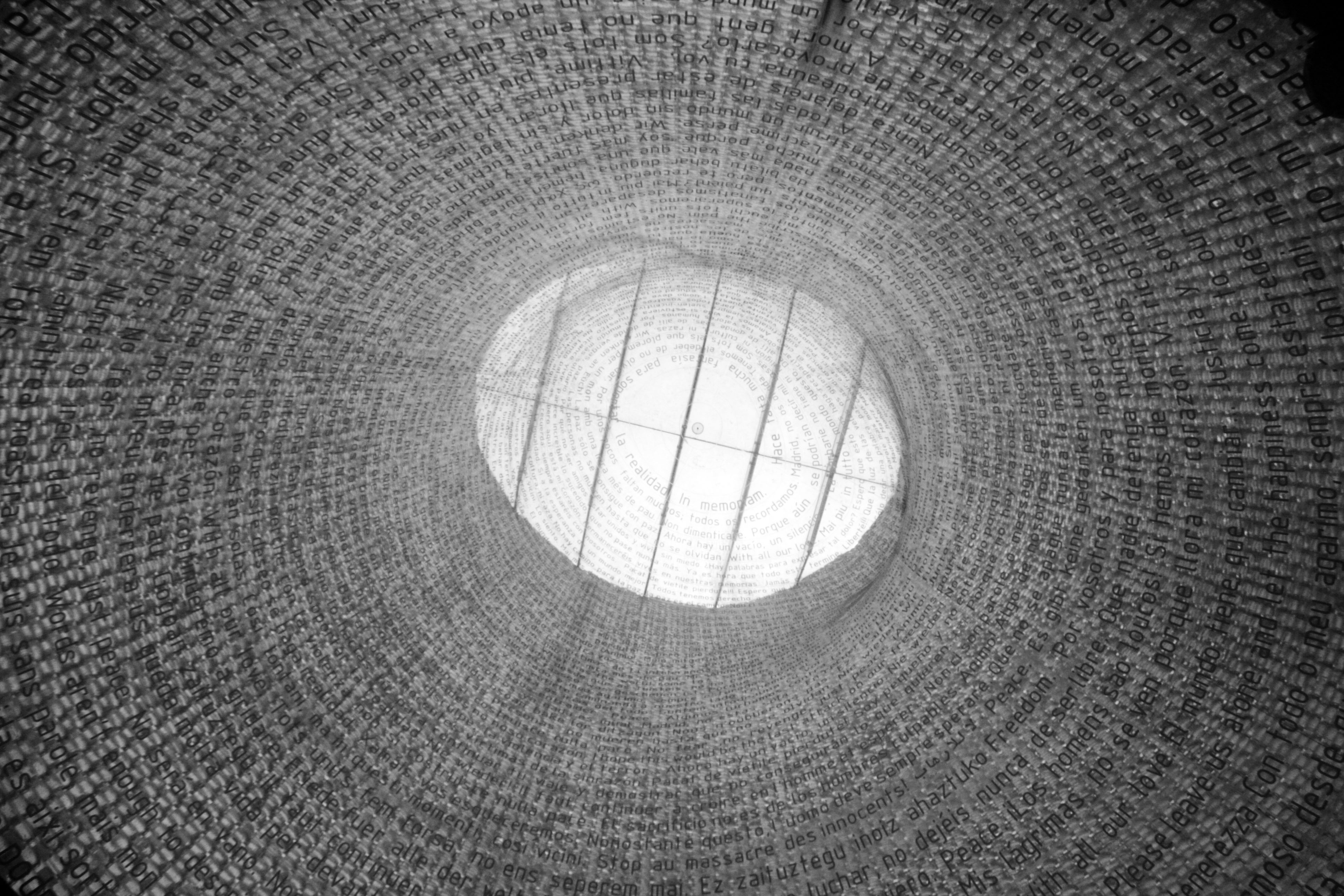
Interior of the Atocha station memorial

On 10 June 2004, a somber and minimalist Atocha station memorial was dedicated to the victims of the attacks. The monument includes a virtual shrine. Visitors to the attacked stations can leave a hand silhouette and a message through special-purpose consoles. A second monument to this event, known as 11-M in Spain, is the Bosque del Recuerdo (Forest of Remembrance) in the Parque del Buen Retiro near Atocha. This monument is made up of 192 olive and cypress trees, one for each person who died on that day, with a tree also planted in remembrance of the police officer who died on 3 April 2004. He died as a result of a suicide bomb during the attempt to capture a number of the perpetrators, four of whom were killed by the bomb. Initially inaugurated as the Bosque de los Ausentes (Forest of the Departed), the site was renamed on the first anniversary of the devastating attack. The forest is surrounded by a stream, with water as a symbol of life.

== Services ==
=== Trains from Puerta de Atocha ===
Preceding station	Renfe Operadora	Following station
Terminus	AVE	Ciudad Real towards Seville-Santa Justa
Terminus	AVE	Ciudad Real towards Málaga María Zambrano
Terminus	AVE	Cuenca–Fernando Zóbel towards Castellón de la Plana
Terminus	AVE	Cuenca–Fernando Zóbel towards Murcia del Carmen
Terminus	AVE	Guadalajara–Yebes towards Barcelona Sants
Terminus	AVE	Guadalajara–Yebes towards Figueres-Vilafant
Terminus	AVE	Guadalajara–Yebes towards Huesca
Terminus	AVE	Barcelona Sants towards Marseille-St-Charles
Terminus	Avlo	Barcelona Sants Terminus
Terminus	Avlo	Zaragoza Delicias towards Barcelona Sants
Terminus	Avlo	Guadalajara–Yebes towards Figueres-Vilafant
Terminus	Alvia	Ciudad Real towards Cádiz
Terminus	Alvia	Córdoba towards Huelva Término
Terminus	Alvia	Albacete-Los Llanos towards Valencia-Joaquín Sorolla
Terminus	Alvia	Guadalajara–Yebes towards Logroño
Terminus	Alvia	Guadalajara–Yebes towards Pamplona
Terminus	Alvia	Cuenca–Fernando Zóbel towards Vinaròs
Madrid Chamartín towards Gijón	Alvia	Cuenca–Fernando Zóbel towards Alicante
Madrid Chamartín towards A Coruña	Alvia	Cuenca–Fernando Zóbel towards Alicante
Madrid Chamartín towards Pontevedra	Alvia	Cuenca–Fernando Zóbel towards Alicante
Madrid Chamartín towards Santander	Alvia	Cuenca–Fernando Zóbel towards Alicante
Madrid Chamartín towards Gijón	Alvia	Ciudad Real towards Cádiz
Madrid Chamartín towards Santander	Alvia	Ciudad Real towards Cádiz
Madrid Chamartín towards Gijón	Alvia	Ciudad Real towards Oropesa del Mar
Terminus	Altaria	Ciudad Real towards Algeciras
Terminus	Intercity	Cuenca-Fernando Zóbel towards Vinaròs
Terminus	Intercity	Cuenca-Fernando Zóbel towards Gandía
Terminus	Avant 85	Ciudad Real towards Puertollano
Terminus	Avant 87	Toledo Terminus

=== Trains from Atocha–Cercanías ===
Preceding station	Renfe Operadora	Following station
Terminus	Altaria	Alcázar de San Juan towards Murcia del Carmen
Terminus	Altaria	Alcázar de San Juan towards Cartagena
Madrid Chamartín Terminus	Talgo	Alcázar de San Juan towards Almería
Nuevos Ministerios towards Madrid Chamartín	Intercity	Alcázar de San Juan towards Valencia Nord
Madrid Chamartín Terminus	Intercity	Aranjuez towards Águilas
Madrid Chamartín Terminus	Intercity	Leganés towards Badajoz
Terminus	Intercity	Leganés towards Zafra
Terminus	Intercity	Leganés towards Huelva
Terminus	Media Distancia 48	Villaverde Bajo towards Valencia Nord
Terminus	Media Distancia 51	Madrid Chamartín towards Ávila
Terminus	Media Distancia 52	Leganés towards Badajoz
Terminus	Media Distancia 53	Recoletos towards Segovia
Madrid Chamartín Terminus	Media Distancia 57	Aranjuez towards Albacete-Los Llanos
Madrid Chamartín Terminus	Media Distancia 58	Aranjuez towards Jaén
Terminus	Media Distancia 60	Aranjuez towards Badajoz

=== Suburban trains ===
Preceding station	Cercanías Madrid	Following station
Recoletos towards Aeropuerto T4	C-1	Méndez Álvaro towards Príncipe Pío
Recoletos towards Chamartín	C-2	Asamblea de Madrid-Entrevías towards Guadalajara
Sol towards Chamartín	C-3	Villaverde Bajo towards Aranjuez
Sol towards Alcobendas-San Sebastián de los Reyes or Colmenar Viejo	C-4	Villaverde Bajo towards Parla
Embajadores towards Móstoles-El Soto	C-5	Méndez Álvaro towards Humanes
Recoletos towards Príncipe Pío	C-7	Asamblea de Madrid-Entrevías towards Alcalá de Henares
Recoletos towards Santa María de la Alameda or Cercedilla	C-8	Asamblea de Madrid-Entrevías towards Guadalajara
Recoletos towards Chamartín	C-10	Méndez Álvaro towards Villalba

== See also ==
- 1977 Atocha massacre
