= BQZ =

BQZ can refer to:

- Manenguba languages, a language family spoken in Cameroon, by ISO 639-3 code
- Beyond the Quadra Zone, an open-ended science fiction board game
- Badajoz railway station, a train station in Badajoz, Spain
- Ballalpur railway station, a train station near Farraka, West Bengal, India
