= Tactical Assault Group (game) =

Play-by-mail role playing game

- Publishers: Quest Games, Inc.
- Years active: 1987 to unknown
- Genres: strategy, play-by-mail
- Languages: English
- Players: 20–60
- Materials required: Instructions, order sheets, turn results, paper, pencil, computer
- Media type: Play-by-mail or email

Tactical Assault Group is a closed-ended, computer-moderated, role-playing strategy play-by-mail (PBM) game. The game was set in the future. There were 20–60 players per game in a seven-story building who operated in Tactical Assault Groups.

== History and development ==
Tactical Assault Group was available for play in 1987. It was a closed-ended, computer-moderated, strategy play-by-mail game. Quest Games, publishers of Beyond the Quadra Zone and Quadrant Wars, published the game. In 1987, the publisher offered new games with turn turnaround times of ten days and two weeks.

== Gameplay ==
Tactical Assault Group was set in the future where players hunted opponents with the goal of being the lone survivor. At the outset, players role-played skilled agents who have been accepted into the elite organization. Play was individual, with the goal to "eliminate a randomly-chosen target and then his target until there is a sole survivor". Player characters had characteristics such as "endurance, cunning, accuracy, defense and skill", where an endurance of zero caused player death. Players had to also avoid assassins. The game allowed 20–60 players to negotiate a seven-story building. This underground building had 175 rooms in a grid pattern, each of which had two to four doors.

Players navigated the building with a computer that accepted 26 questions. Phasers and explosives were available as lethal tools. Nonlethal tools included keys, robots, surveillance equipment, raw materials, energy, energy transfer packs, and shields. Diplomacy was not a game element. Major game approaches included immediately seeking your target or improving your position first.

== Reception ==
David Webber, the editor of Paper Mayhem, reviewed the game in a 1987 issue of the magazine. He stated that it was a simple as well as a "good and challenging game". Loren Moody and Greg Smith reviewed the game in a 1988 issue of Flagship. They noted drawbacks such as value for money, simplicity, and lack of diplomacy. Moody and Smith noted that the diplomatic aspect could be appealing to some players. Jim Townsend reviewed the game in a 1988 issue of Paper Mayhem. He stated that, "For those of you who like simple games with no diplomacy and no real interaction, I will recommend Tactical Assault Group highly. It takes these ideas to an extreme. However, for players who are looking for traditional values in PBM games, like interaction, diplomacy and all the rest, I cannot say that this game will please you."

== See also ==
- List of play-by-mail games
- Tactical assault group

== Bibliography ==
- Moody, Loren; Smith, Greg (1988). "Tactical Assault Group". Flagship. No. 19. pp. 33–35.
- Quest Games (September–October 1987). "Gameline: Quest Games; Tactical Assault Group". Paper Mayhem. No. 26. p. 28.
- Townsend, Jim (May–June 1988). "A Review of Tactical Assault Group". Paper Mayhem. No. 30. pp. 26–28.
- Webber, David (May–June 1987). "An Introduction to Tactical Assault Group". Paper Mayhem. No. 24. p. 28.
- Webber, David (July–August 1987). "More on Tactical Assault Group". Paper Mayhem. No. 25. pp. 32–33.
- Webber, David (1987). "Tactical Assault Group". Space Gamer. No. 81. pp. 39–41.
