= Jerez Airport =

Jerez Airport Aeropuerto de Jerez

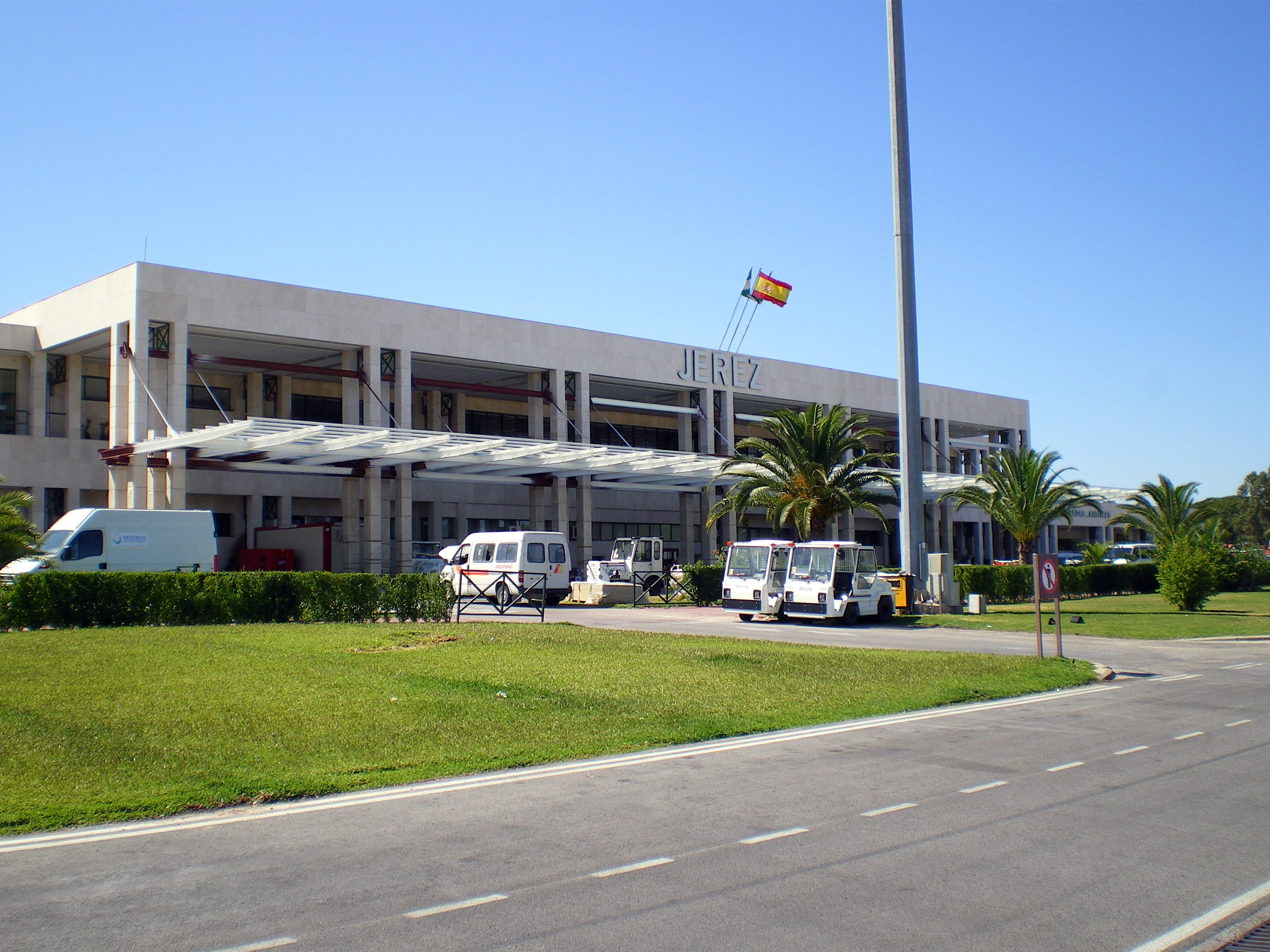
- IATA: XRY; ICAO: LEJR

Summary
- Airport type: Public
- Owner/Operator: AENA
- Serves: Cádiz and Jerez de la Frontera, Spain
- Location: Jerez de la Frontera (Cádiz), Andalusia, Spain
- Elevation AMSL: 28 m (92 ft)
- Coordinates: 36°44′41″N 006°03′36″W

Map
- Location within Spain

Runways
Direction	Length		Surface
Direction	m	ft	Surface
02/20	2,300	7,546	Asphalt

Statistics (2025)
- Passengers: 884.539
- Passenger change 24-25: ▼6,9%
- Movements: 50.515
- Source: AENA

Jerez Airport (Spanish: Aeropuerto de Jerez) (IATA: XRY, ICAO: LEJR) is an airport located 9 km (5.6 mi) northeast of Jerez de la Frontera in Andalusia, Spain, about 28.1 mi (45.2 km) from Cádiz.

== Overview ==
Jerez Airport is a modern airport with the principal arrival and departure areas on the ground floor. Ryanair introduced regular flights between Jerez Airport and London, which helped to increase passenger numbers at the airport to 1.1 million in 2004. Most visitors at the airport arrive from Germany (39%) and the UK (7%). However, around 48% of all arriving passengers at Jerez Airport come from domestic flights.

One of the leading flight schools, FTE Jerez, is based at the airport's old military barracks.

== Airlines and destinations ==
The following airlines operate regular scheduled and charter flights at Jerez de la Frontera Airport:

Airlines	Destinations
Binter Canarias	Gran Canaria, Tenerife–North
Chair Airlines	Seasonal charter: Bern
Condor	Seasonal: Düsseldorf, Frankfurt, Hamburg
Discover Airlines	Seasonal: Frankfurt, Munich
Edelweiss Air	Seasonal: Zürich
Enter Air	Seasonal charter: Warsaw-Chopin
Eurowings	Düsseldorf; Seasonal: Berlin, Hamburg
Iberia	Madrid; Seasonal: Santander
Icelandair	Seasonal Charter: Reykjavik
Jet2.com	Seasonal: Birmingham, Leeds/Bradford, London–Stansted, Manchester
Luxair	Seasonal: Luxembourg
Marabu	Seasonal: Hamburg
TUI fly Belgium	Seasonal: Brussels
TUI fly Deutschland	Seasonal: Düsseldorf, Frankfurt, Hannover, Munich, Stuttgart
Volotea	Asturias
Vueling	Barcelona, Palma de Mallorca; Seasonal: Bilbao, Santiago de Compostela
Wizz Air	Madrid (begins 14 December 2026)

== Statistics ==
=== Busiest routes ===
Busiest international routes from XRY (2023)
Rank	Destination	Passengers	Change 2022/23
1	Düsseldorf	90,794	▼2%
2	Frankfurt	78,969	▼12%
3	London-Stansted	32,640	▲7%
4	Hannover	27,622	▲12%
5	Munich	20,509	▼45%
6	Hamburg	16,850	▼27%
7	Brussels	13,335	▲7%
8	Stuttgart	12,586	▲8%
9	London-Gatwick	9,327	▼45%
10	Luxembourg	8,221	▲7%
Source: Estadísticas de tráfico aereo

Busiest domestic routes from XRY (2023)
Rank	Destination	Passengers	Change 2022/23
1	Madrid	238,934	▲26%
2	Barcelona	198,644	0%
3	Palma de Mallorca	68,342	▼16%
4	Tenerife-North	20,523	0%
5	Gran Canaria	20,294	▲74%
Source: Estadísticas de tráfico aereo

== Ground transportation ==
=== Rail ===
Jerez-Aeropuerto railway station serves the airport. Local Cercanías trains on line C1 as well as medium-distance trains to Jerez de la Frontera, Cadiz, Córdoba and Seville stop at the station.

=== Bus ===
There are infrequent buses to and from the airport to Jerez, El Puerto de Santa Maria and Cádiz.
