= Almería railway station =

Railway and bus station in Almería, Spain

Almería
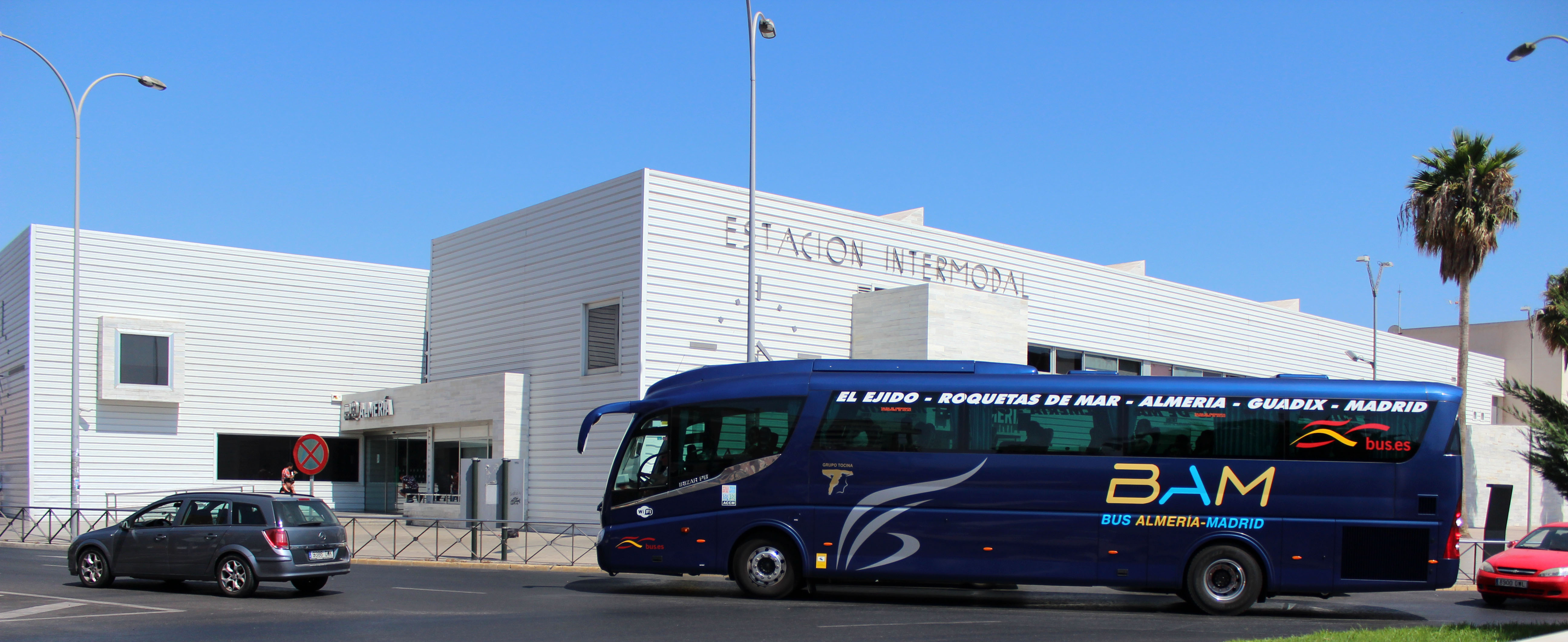
- New intermodal station building

General information
- Location: Almería, Andalusia, Spain
- Coordinates: 36.83466°N 2.456159°W
- Owner: Adif
- Operator: Renfe
- Lines: Linares Baeza–Almería railway; Murcia–Almería high-speed rail line (future)

History
- Opened: 1893
- Rebuilt: 2005

Passengers
- 2024: 322,886
Location

Almería railway station is the main railway station of the Spanish city of Almería, Andalusia.

== History ==
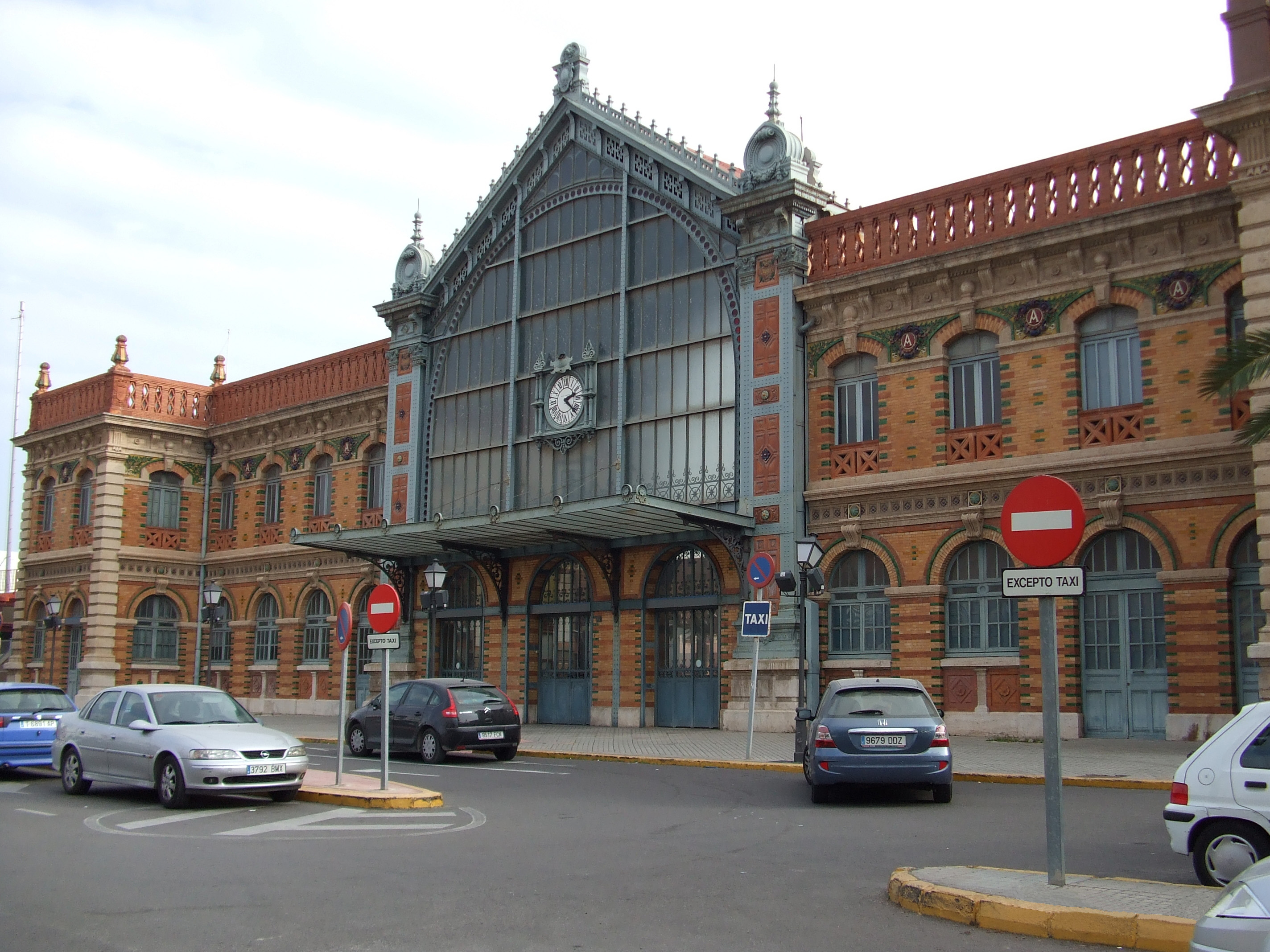
Old station building, now disused

Almería's railway station originally opened in 1893 as the terminus for the line to Madrid. In 2005, the railway and bus station were combined in a new location next to the old station building.

The number of passengers at the station decreased considerably in the 2000s; in 2000 the station was used by 240,344 passengers, but had decreased to 107,409 in 2017. In the 2020s numbers increased considerably.

== Services ==
Almería is served by Media Distancia trains to Linares Baeza and Granada, along with Intercity services to Madrid Atocha which takes around six hours.

== Future ==
Almería is the future terminus of the Murcia–Almería high-speed rail line, which will link Almería to Madrid Atocha via Murcia del Carmen, Albacete-Los Llanos and Cuenca–Fernando Zóbel.
