= Atocha station memorial =

2004 Madrid train bombing

Coordinates: 40°24′25″N 3°41′20″W

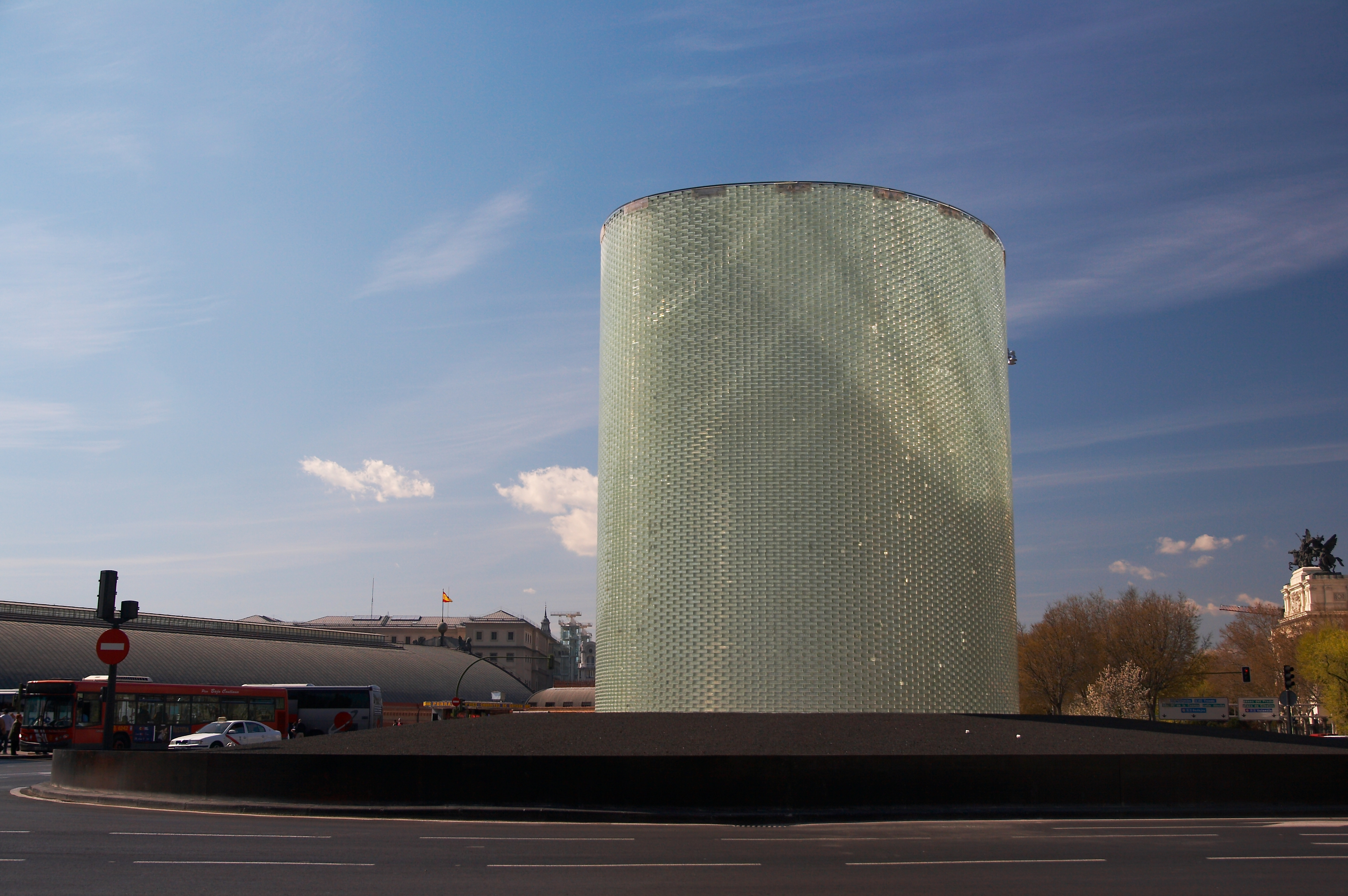
Atocha station memorial

The Atocha station memorial was a memorial monument located at Atocha station in Madrid, Spain, that commemorated the 193 victims of the 11 March 2004 Madrid train bombings. Furthermore, it also honored the special forces agent who died when seven suicide bombers blew themselves up on 3 April 2004 during a raid on an apartment used by the bombers.

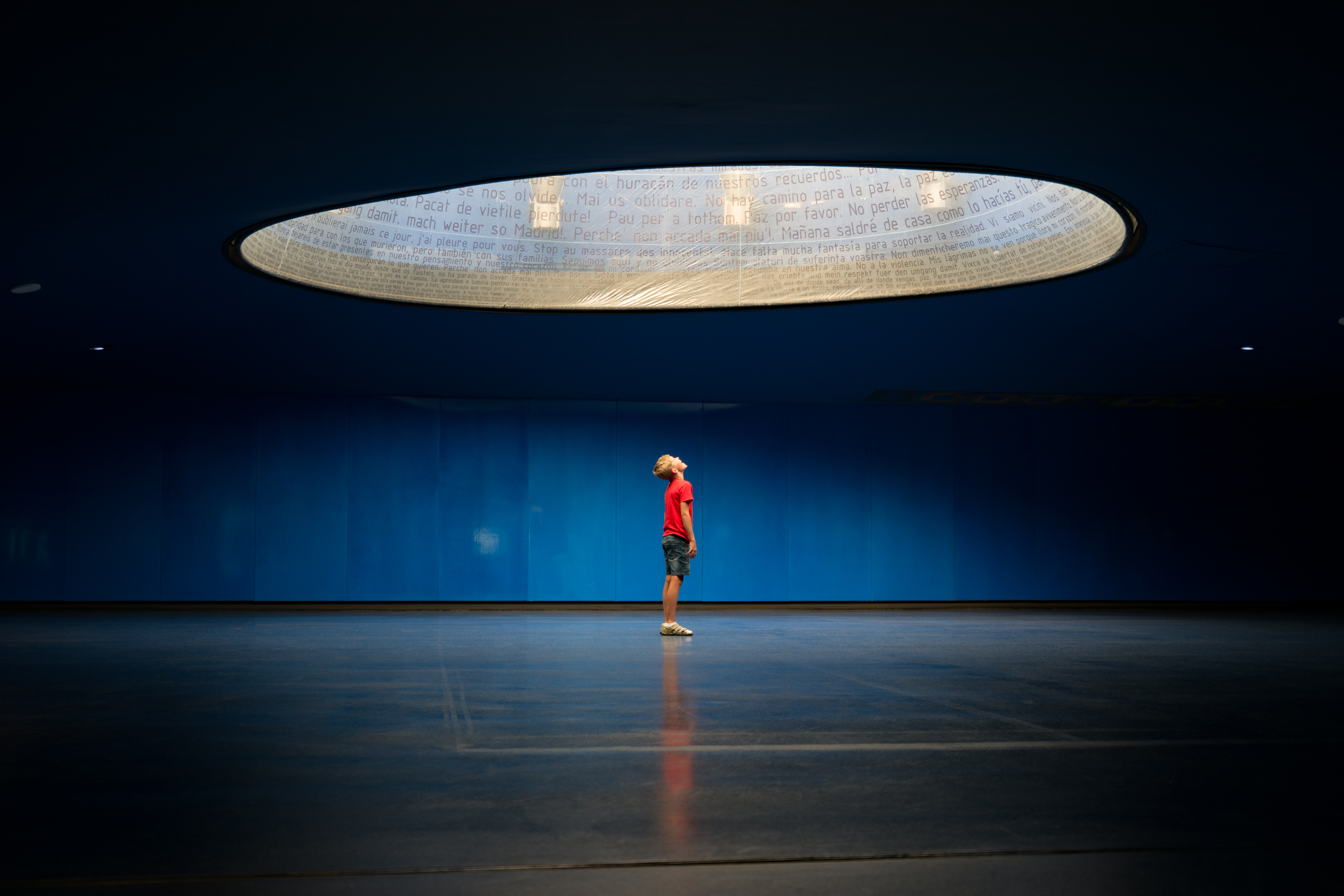
Interior of the monument.

The 11 m (36 ft) tall cylinder stood above Atocha station, the destination of the four trains that were attacked. Texts composed of hundreds of expressions of grief sent in the days after the attack from all over the world were printed on a clear colourless membrane that was inflated by air pressure, rising balloon-like inside a cylinder. That structure was composed of glass blocks and sat on a platform or terrace overhead. The light in the empty blue room below came from this source alone. At night the cylinder was illuminated by lamps within its base and could be seen throughout the station neighborhood.

King Juan Carlos, Queen Sofia and Prime Minister José Luis Rodríguez Zapatero attended a ceremony at the site on the third anniversary of the bombings, 11 March 2007. Wreaths were laid at the foot of the tower and mourners observed three minutes of silence.

== Decommission and new memorial ==
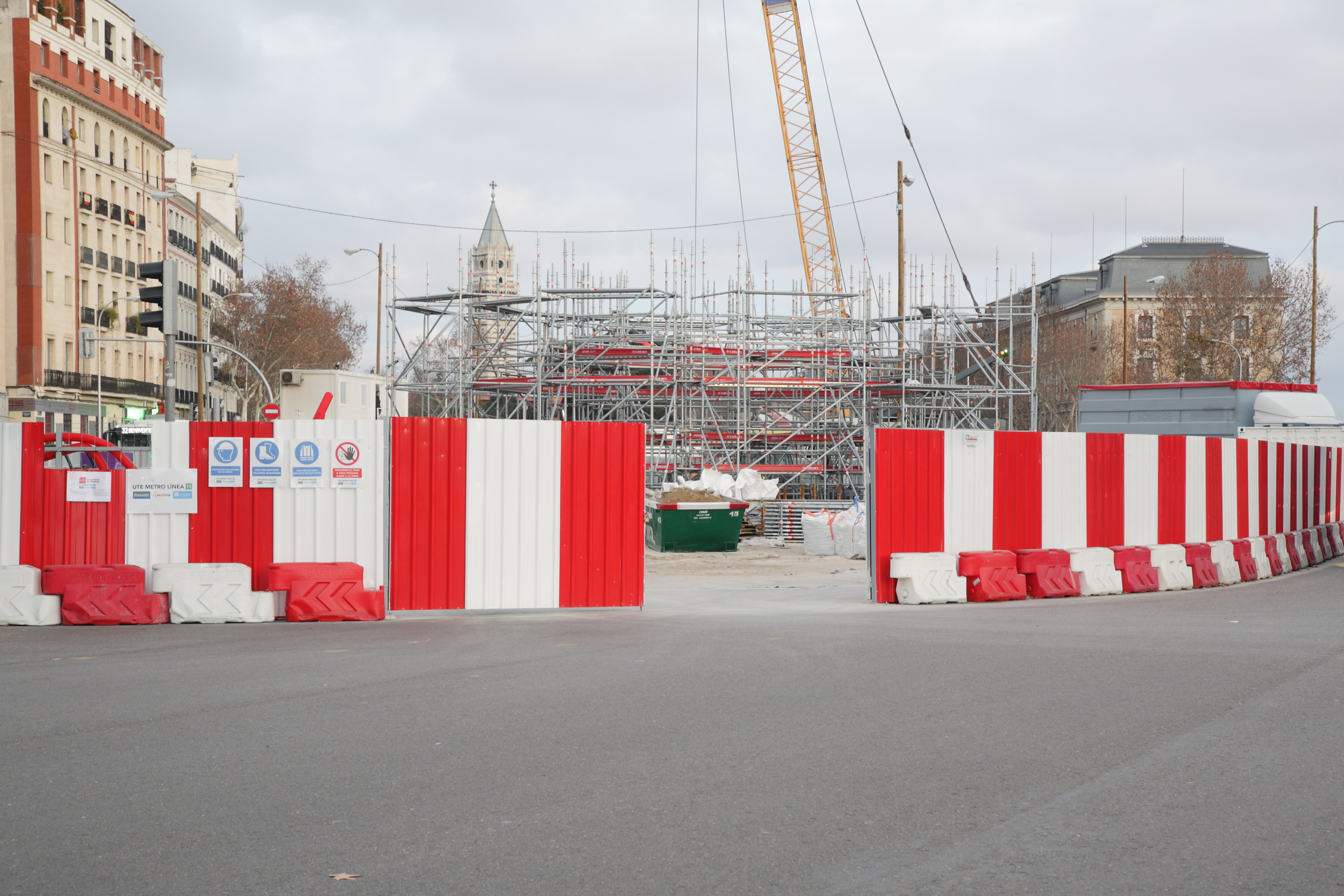
The monument being dismantled in early 2024.

In 2023, works began to dismantle the monument to allow for the expansion of Line 11 of the Madrid Metro. The dismantling was completed in February 2024.

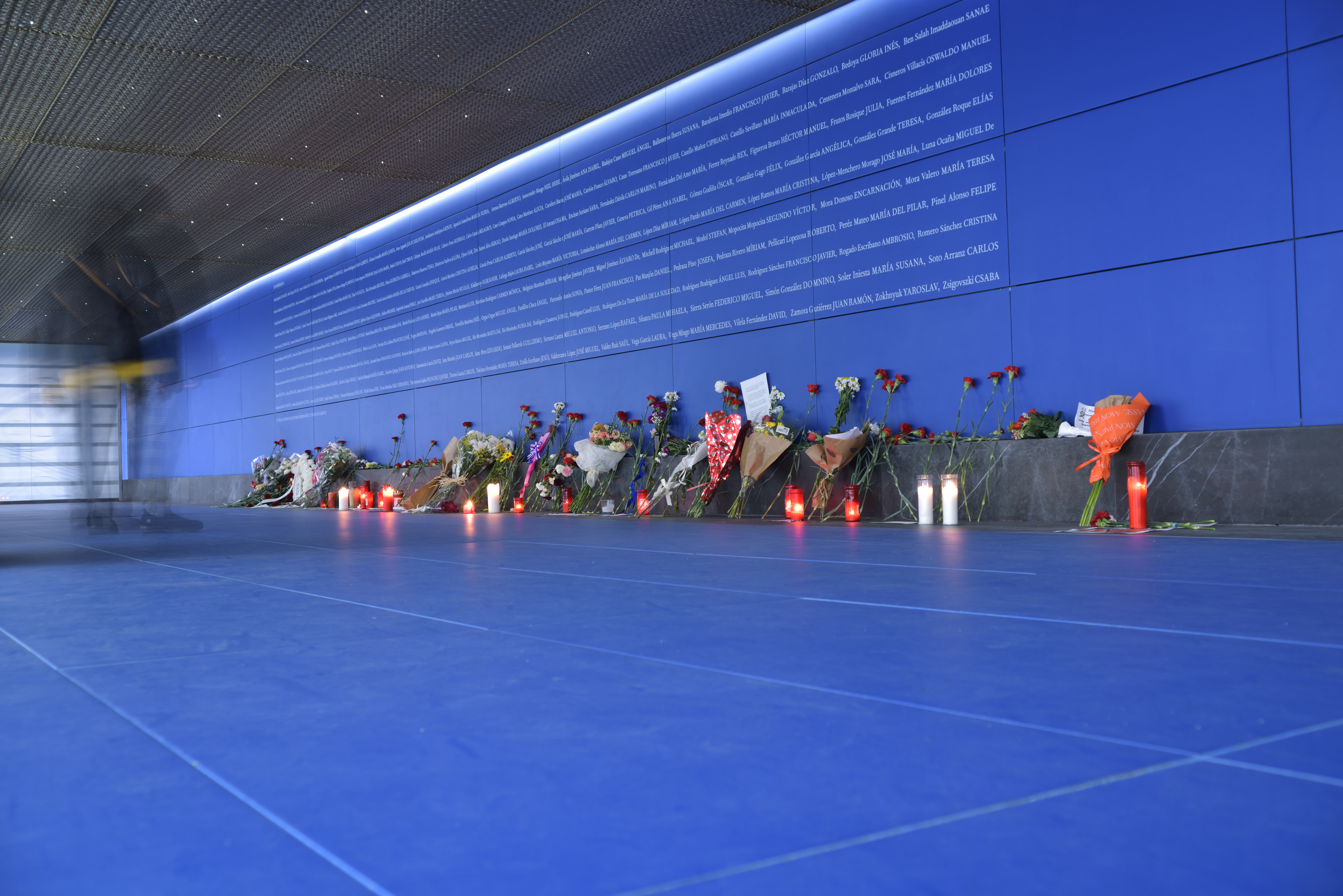
The new underground 11-M memorial, located in the vestibule of Atocha Metro station, features cobalt blue walls engraved with the names of the victims and messages of remembrance, alongside floral tributes and candles left by visitors.

Ahead of the 20th anniversary of the attacks, a temporary blue beam of light was projected skyward from the site during the nights of 10 and 11 March 2024. On 10 March 2024, a new underground memorial was inaugurated beneath the original location. Its cobalt blue walls, chosen by victims' associations, are engraved with the names of those who died in the attacks and with some of the messages that once appeared inside the dismantled glass monument.
