= Madrid Puerta de Atocha-Almudena Grandes =

Madrid-Puerta de Atocha-Almudena Grandes
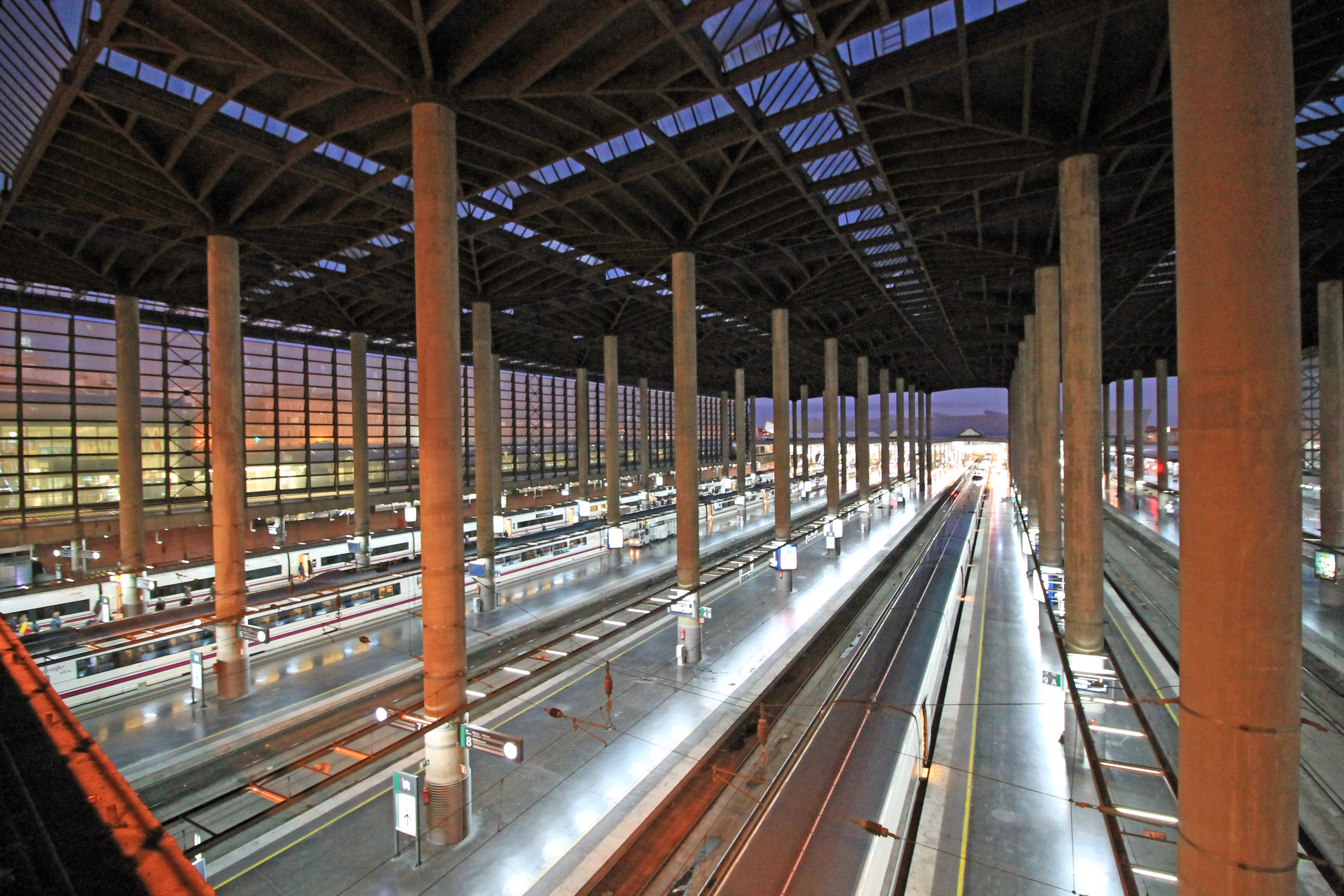
- Platforms at Madrid-Puerta de Atocha-Almudena Grandes railway station

General information
- Location: Arganzuela / Retiro; Spain
- Elevation: 618.18 m
- Operator: Renfe, SNCF, ILSA
- Lines: Madrid–Seville high-speed rail line Madrid–Barcelona high-speed rail line
- Platforms: 8
- Tracks: 15
- Connections: Atocha-Cercanías; Madrid Metro: Atocha; EMT Madrid urban buses

Other information
- Station code: 60000
- Website: Adif

History
- Opened: 1992

Passengers
- 18,537,947 (2006)
Location

Madrid-Puerta de Atocha-Almudena Grandes is a railway station located within the Atocha railway complex in the Spanish city of Madrid. Within the complex, it serves high-speed rail services and most long-distance trains. The remaining trains stopping at Atocha use the Atocha–Cercanías railway station.

== Railway situation ==
The station is situated at an elevation of 618.18 metres (2,028.1 ft) above sea level and forms part of the following railway lines:

- The standard gauge Madrid–Seville high-speed rail line, at kilometre point 0.0.
- The standard gauge Madrid–Barcelona high-speed rail line, at kilometre point 0.0.

== History ==
=== Construction of Puerta de Atocha ===
The station was built between 1985 and 1992, behind the original Atocha railway station, which dated from 1892, in connection with the arrival of the Madrid–Seville high-speed rail line. The project, directed by architect Rafael Moneo, involved replacing the original Atocha station with two stations, Atocha-Cercanías and Puerta de Atocha, while converting the original station building into the main concourse providing access to both new stations.

Exterior of the station

The station takes its name from the former Puerta de Atocha, a gate in the Fence of Philip IV which stood a short distance from the station and was one of the entrances to the city of Madrid.

The building consists of a large hypostyle hall and partly follows the design of the former station. It is a terminal station, with no through tracks, although the platform level is slightly lower than that of the original track area.

Access to the new terminal is provided through the historic train shed, which includes a commercial and leisure area for passengers near the platforms. The historic train shed also has direct access from Méndez Álvaro Street, access via the taxi bridge separating it from the new terminal, and an underground gallery connecting it with the Cercanías and Metro interchange.

=== Redevelopment ===
A series of works aimed at increasing the station's capacity began in the late 2000s. Originally, all passenger movements through the terminal took place on the lower level. However, owing to the growth in passenger numbers, mainly resulting from high-speed rail services, arrivals were reorganised to use the lower level, while departures, waiting rooms and passenger security controls were moved to a level above.

Since 2010, arrivals have taken place through a newly constructed terminal, while departures have used the upper and lower levels closest to the historic train shed. The boarding level is indicated on information screens and announced over the public-address system when a train is approaching its departure time.

Redevelopment works continued with the construction of the Atocha–Chamartín high-speed railway tunnel, which includes four new through tracks beneath platforms 14 and 15 and Méndez Álvaro Street.

On 13 June 2023, the Spanish government approved a new expansion project costing approximately €500 million. The project includes a new underground station with two through high-speed platforms serving the tracks of the Atocha–Chamartín tunnel, redevelopment of the northern side of the station, and construction of a new southern concourse along Méndez Álvaro Street.

On 3 March 2022, it was announced that the station would be named after Madrid-born writer Almudena Grandes.

A few months later, on 19 November 2022, the name change was officially published in the Boletín Oficial del Estado (Official State Gazette). The modification of the catalogue of railway lines and sections of the General Interest Railway Network to reflect the new name was also published.

== Layout ==
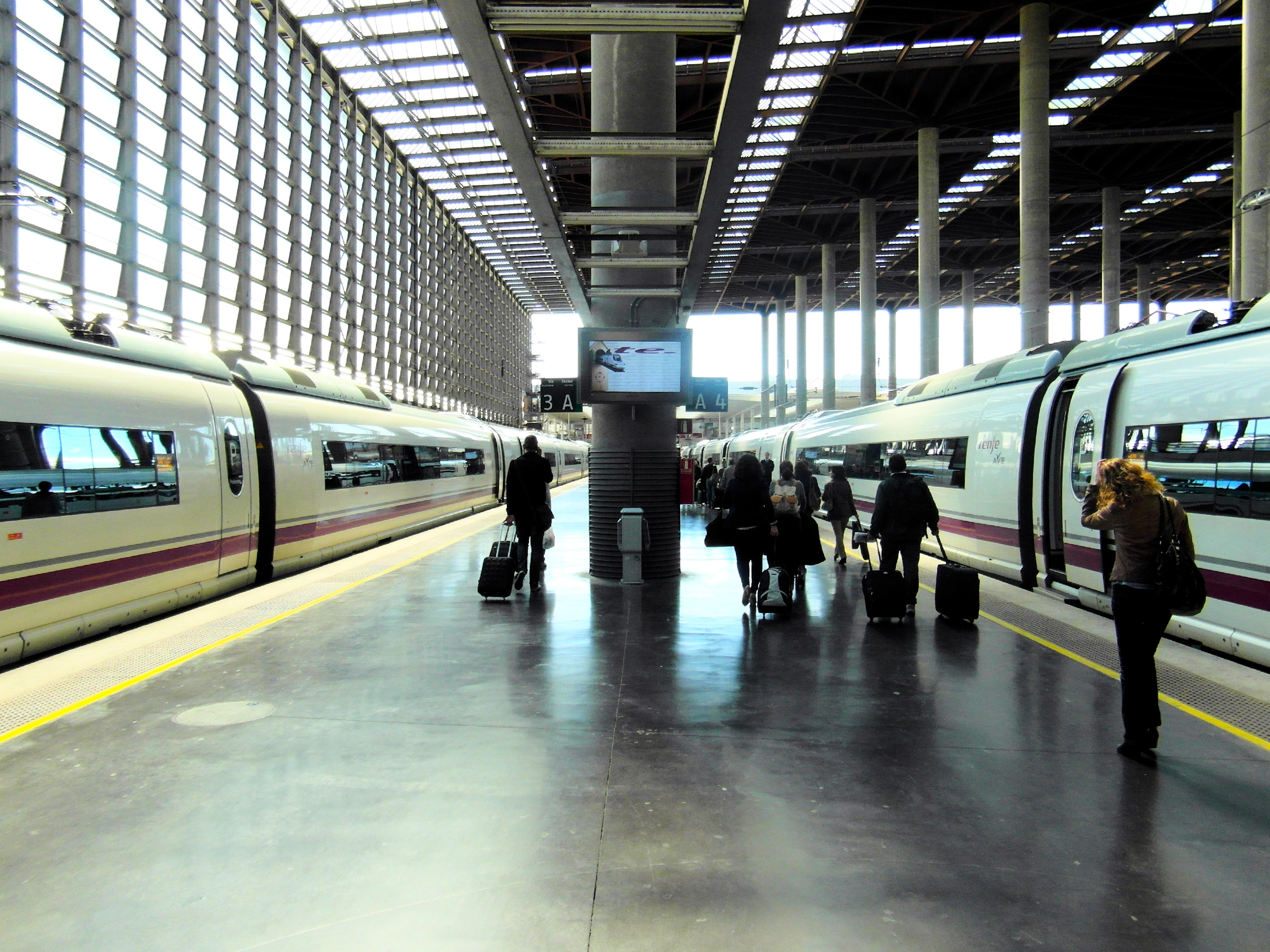
Platforms

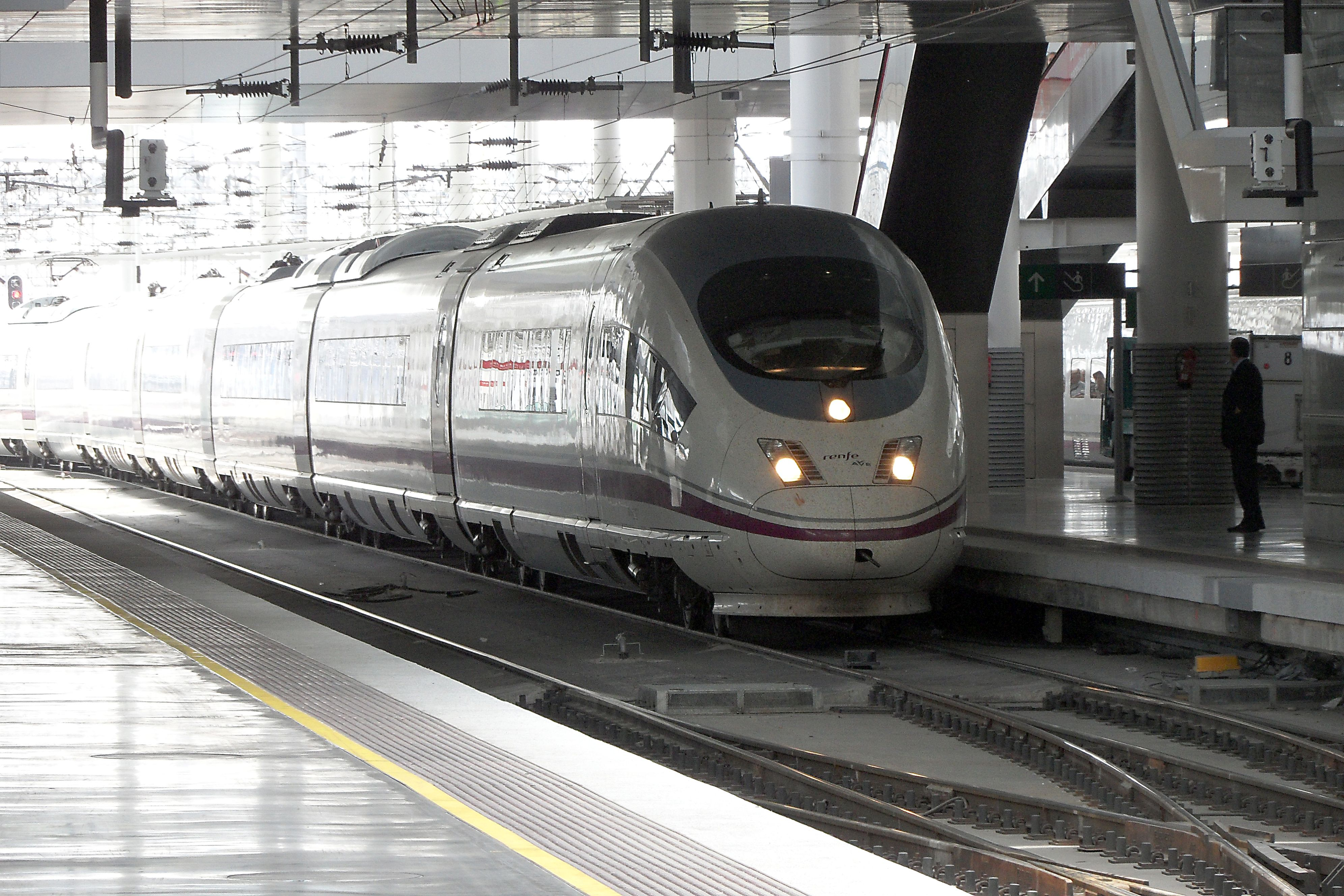
A crossover in the middle of a platform, allowing two trains to operate on the same track

=== The station ===
The station is a terminus with 15 tracks ending at buffer stops. Each track, with the exception of track 1, has a crossover in the middle of its platform. This arrangement allows two trains to occupy each track, with the inner train able to depart by crossing over to the other track. It consequently allows three trains to operate simultaneously for every two tracks.

Initially, the station had both Iberian gauge tracks (1,668 mm), used by the conventional railway network, and standard gauge tracks (1,435 mm), used by the high-speed network. Some Iberian-gauge tracks were subsequently converted to standard gauge, with the gradual conversion eventually resulting in the entire station being equipped with 1,435 mm standard-gauge tracks.

The original electrification system was 3 kV direct current, differing from the 25 kV alternating current system used on high-speed lines. Consequently, high-speed trains operating at the station initially had to be dual-voltage trains. Subsequently, the standard-gauge tracks were electrified at 25 kV AC, providing continuous electrification throughout the station.

=== Railway lines ===
Puerta de Atocha connects with the Madrid–Seville and Madrid–Barcelona high-speed lines.

The Madrid–Levante high-speed rail line, which is currently in operation, passes beneath Puerta de Atocha and continues towards Chamartín through the third Túnel de la Risa. A station serving this tunnel is planned beneath the platforms at Puerta de Atocha.

Previously, trains arriving from Alicante and Valencia on the Madrid–Levante high-speed line terminated at Puerta de Atocha, accessing the station via the Madrid–Seville high-speed line through the Torrejón de Velasco junction.

Following the opening of the Atocha–Chamartín tunnel and the arrival of new operators such as Ouigo and Iryo, high-speed trains serving Murcia, Alicante and Valencia have been transferred to Chamartín.

There were formerly two connections with the conventional railway network. One provided a direct connection to the Iberian-gauge tracks, which ceased to be used when those tracks were replaced. The other used a track gauge changer, which has also recently ceased to be used following the opening of the Atocha–Chamartín high-speed tunnel and the quadrupling of the tracks between Atocha and Torrejón de Velasco. At Torrejón de Velasco, the junction towards the Levante region connects with the Madrid–Seville high-speed line.

== Rail services ==
Since the respective openings of the high-speed lines, trains arriving in Madrid from the high-speed routes serving Barcelona, Andalusia and the Levante region have traditionally terminated at Puerta de Atocha.

Trains equipped with a track gauge changer could reverse direction at the station and continue towards Atocha-Cercanías. This operation was formerly performed by Alvia trains connecting Santander and Gijón with Alicante, as well as Castellón. These services currently stop only at Chamartín.

Conventional trains previously terminated at Puerta de Atocha. However, following the expansion of the AVE network and the associated conversion of track gauge and electrification to accommodate high-speed trains, these services were transferred to Madrid Atocha-Cercanías or Chamartín, owing to the reduction in the number of Iberian-gauge tracks at the station.

In May 2021, the low-cost railway operator Ouigo began operating services between Madrid and Barcelona. Subsequently, the entry of additional operators, including Iryo, on routes to Barcelona, Valencia, Seville and Málaga contributed to congestion at the station and on the railway access towards Torrejón de Velasco.

To address this situation, services are expected to be redirected towards Chamartín through the newly opened high-speed tunnel.

In September 2022, high-speed services to the Levante region were reorganised, with the exception of the Madrid–Orihuela AVE service. The terminus of these routes was transferred to Chamartín, and their Atocha stops were discontinued pending the construction of the through station.

In December 2022, following the opening of the Orihuela–Murcia high-speed section, the Murcia AVE service also began terminating at Chamartín.

In January 2023, AVE and Avlo trains between Madrid and Valencia were transferred to Chamartín following the commissioning of new high-speed tracks 14 and 15 and the expansion of the track facilities at Chamartín to include tracks 22 to 25.

Consequently, Puerta de Atocha currently serves as the terminus for high-speed services operated by Renfe, Ouigo and Iryo to Barcelona and Andalusia, while Chamartín serves as the terminus for services to the Levante region.

=== Long-distance services ===
The following routes are listed in the Spanish article:

- AVE:
  - Madrid–Seville
  - Madrid–Málaga
  - Madrid–Barcelona
  - Madrid–Figueres
  - Madrid–Marseille
  - Madrid–Huesca
  - Madrid–Granada
  - Madrid–Castellón
  - Seville–Huesca
  - Murcia–Málaga
  - Madrid–Cádiz
  - Madrid–Huelva
  - Madrid–Algeciras
  - Madrid–Logroño
  - Madrid–Pamplona
- Avlo:
  - Madrid–Barcelona
  - Madrid–Figueres
  - Madrid–Seville
  - Madrid–Málaga
- Ouigo:
  - Madrid–Barcelona
  - Madrid–Málaga
  - Madrid–Seville
- Iryo:
  - Madrid–Barcelona
  - Barcelona–Seville
  - Madrid–Seville
  - Madrid–Málaga
- Alvia:
  - Madrid–Almería
- Intercity:
  - Madrid–Huelva
