= Hacho Bridge =

Hacho Bridge Puente del Hacho
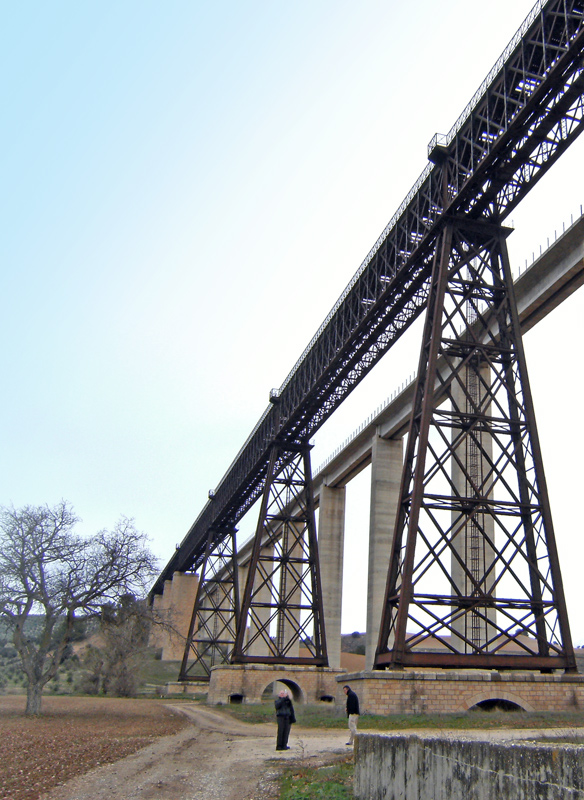
- Hacho Bridge
- Coordinates: 37°35′05″N 3°18′11″W
- Locale: Guadahortuna, Granada, Spain

Characteristics
- Design: Continuous under-deck truss bridge
- Material: Wrought iron
- Total length: 624.6 metres (2,049 ft)
- Width: 4.7 metres (15 ft)
- Height: 49.85 metres (163.5 ft)
- No. of spans: 11

History
- Designer: Students of Gustav Eiffel
- Construction start: 1893
- Construction end: 1897
- Opened: 22 March 1898

Hacho Bridge (Spanish: Puente del Hacho) is a former railway bridge in Granada which was part of the Linares Baeza–Almería railway through the Sierra Nevada, Spain. It remains the longest iron viaduct on the Spanish rail network. The bridge is maintained by Renfe.

== Project ==
In 1889, the Southern Spanish Railway company began building a line from Guadahortuna, in the province of Granada in Spain. The company employed Duvel and Butilia, who were students of Gustave Eiffel, the famous engineer who had built the Eiffel Tower and Garabit viaduct in France and the Dona Maria Pia railway bridge in Porto, Portugal.

A site was chosen for the bridge between the Granadan cities of Guadahortuna and Alamedilla where the railway would cross the Guadahortuna River.

Construction work began in 1893. Work was completed four years later. Hacho Bridge officially opened on 22 March 1898.

== Construction ==
Hacho Bridge is 624.6 metres (2,049 ft) long with a maximum height of 49.85 metres (163.5 ft) at its highest part. It is a continuous under-deck truss bridge that stands on nine wrought iron trestles and stone piers.

The structure's design is based around a central 486 metres (1,594 ft) double beam that runs the whole length of the single-track crossing. This is supported by a trestle made from four iron girders that have cross bracing and are riveted together. The trestles stand on stone piers. A footbridge ran adjacent to the track.

== History ==
The Hacho Bridge operated for more than sixty years. It was even used by both the Nationalists and the Republicans during the Spanish Civil War. Hacho Bridge, which was the largest iron viaduct in Spain, was a major source of employment in the area. Hundreds of people lived for almost a decade near Alamedilla station during its construction. Many continued to live there after it opened, working on its maintenance.

However, in the late 1950s living conditions in Eastern Andalusia, caused by postwar period austerity, meant many people left the area in search of work. At the same time, Spanish railways began to operate heavier diesel locomotives which were unable to use Hacho Bridge due to its maximum load weight.

Ten years later the station at Alamedilla had been closed to passengers. A decade of years later, Spanish railways sold Hacho Bridge to a Madrid scrap dealer together with other bridges on the Almeria line for 1.5 million pesetas.

In November 1978, local people began a campaign to save Hacho Bridge after they discovered that it was to be demolished. The Mayor of Alamedilla, D. Abelardo Corral, appealed to the Governor of Granada, D. José Maria Fernandez Fernandez. In a hastily convened meeting, the provincial government agreed with the local committee and declared Hacho Bridge a Historical Artistic Monument. This injunction was then served on the scrap and demolition company. The Civil Guard were ordered to go immediately to the bridge. They arrived just in time and dismantled the dynamite already installed at the base of trestles.

Hacho Bridge is now protected by a national protection order as a Structure of Cultural Significance.

== Present day ==
A reinforced concrete bridge was built in 1970 to replace Hacho bridge. It runs parallel to the original crossing.

== External linkage ==
- More information
- Modern image
- Video of Hacho Bridge
