= Recoletos Station =

Railway station in Madrid, Spain

Recoletos
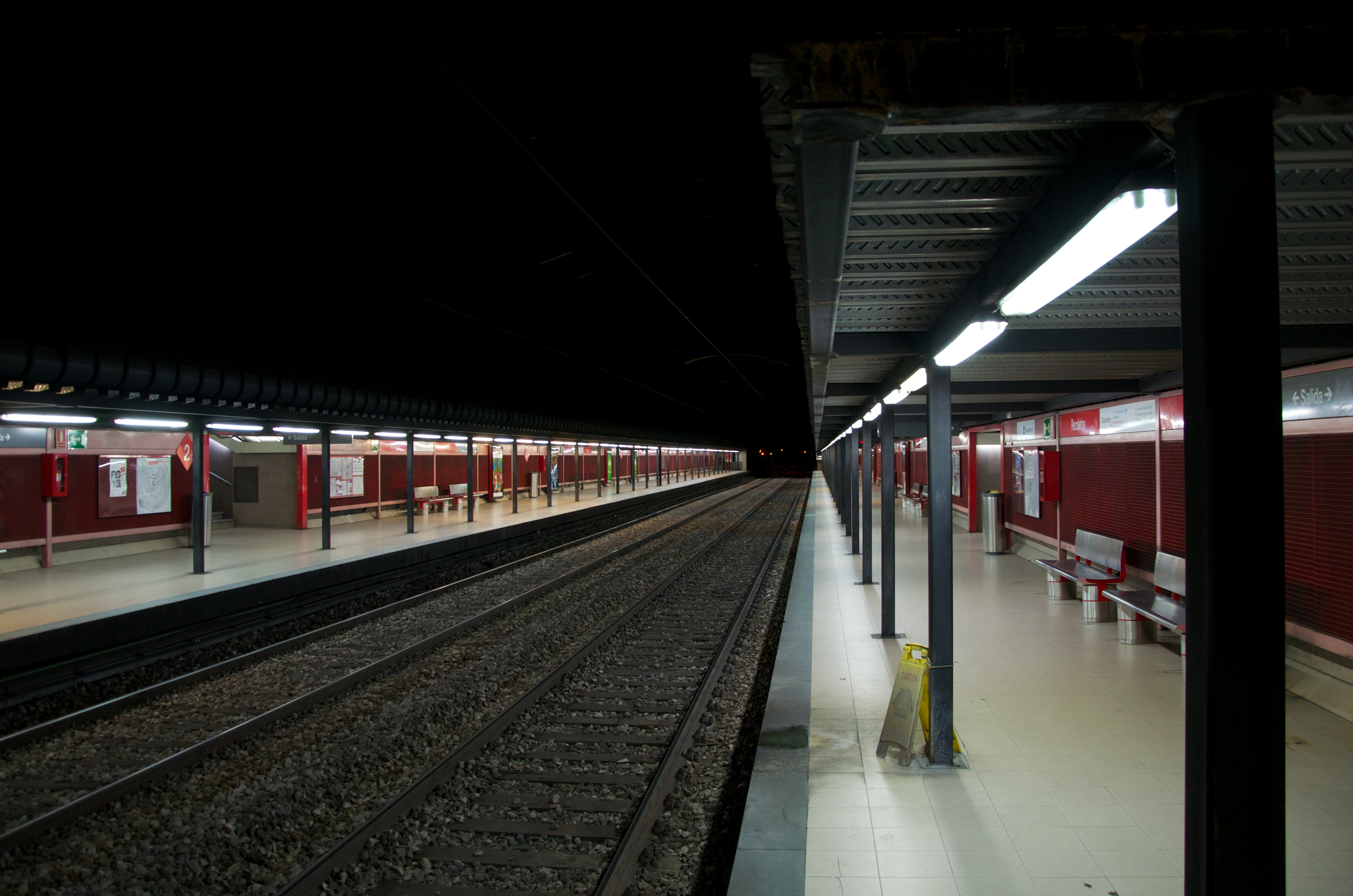

General information
- Location: Centro, Madrid; Spain
- Coordinates: 40°25′21″N 3°41′30″W
- Line: Madrid-Barcelona railway
- Platforms: 2

Construction
- Structure type: Underground
- Platform levels: 2

Other information
- Fare zone: A

History
- Opened: 1967

Services
Preceding station	Renfe Operadora	Following station
Nuevos Ministerios towards Segovia	Media Distancia 53	Madrid Atocha Terminus
Preceding station	Cercanías Madrid	Following station
Nuevos Ministerios towards Aeropuerto T4	C-1	Atocha towards Principe Pío
Nuevos Ministerios towards Chamartín	C-2	Atocha towards Guadalajara
Nuevos Ministerios towards Príncipe Pío	C-7	Atocha towards Alcalá de Henares
Nuevos Ministerios towards Santa María de la Alameda or Cercedilla	C-8	Atocha towards Guadalajara
Nuevos Ministerios towards Chamartín	C-10	Atocha towards Villalba
Location

Recoletos is a Cercanías station in Madrid city center. It was opened in 1967 as part of the Túnel de la risa project and it is located between Atocha and Nuevos Ministerios stations.
