= Murcia–Almería high-speed rail line =

Railway line in Spain

Overview
- Status: Under construction
- Owner: Adif
- Locale: Spain (Region of Murcia, Andalucia)
- Termini: Murcia del Carmen; Almería

Service
- Type: High-speed rail
- Operator: Renfe Operadora

History
- Opened: 2026

Technical
- Line length: 184 km (114 mi)
- Num of tracks: Triple track
- Track gauge: 2 tracks 1,435 mm (4 ft 8 1/2 in) standard gauge, 1 track 1,668 mm (5 ft 5 21/32 in) Iberian gauge
- Electrification: 25 kV 50 Hz
- Operating speed: max 300 km/h (190 mph)

The Murcia–Almería high-speed rail line is an under-construction railway in the Region of Murcia and Andalusia in Spain.

== History ==
Murcia and Almería were once linked by rail from Lorca to Guadix via Baza, however this line closed in 1985.

Since 1992 Spain´s AVE high speed rail network has continued to expand but has yet to connect Almeria. With the Madrid–Levante high-speed rail network reaching Alicante railway station in 2013, and Murcia del Carmen railway station in 2022 a continuation from Murcia to Almería railway station is awaited. Construction of the new high-speed line began in 2010, but was suspended due to political disagreements. In 2017 the Spanish government announced that work would restart in 2019, to be completed by 2023. The railway's estimated completion date has since been pushed to 2026.

== Route ==
The line will serve as a continuation of the Madrid–Levante high-speed rail network at Murcia, serving stations at Lorca and Vera before terminating in Almería. It will include two standard-gauge high-speed tracks for passenger trains with a maximum speed of 300 km/h (190 mph) and a parallel 1668 mm Iberian gauge track for freight. The trip from Murcia to Almería is expected to take 1 hour 5 minutes, and 3.5 hours to Madrid, compared to the current six hours taken using the existing Linares Baeza–Almería railway.
