= Cercanías Cádiz =

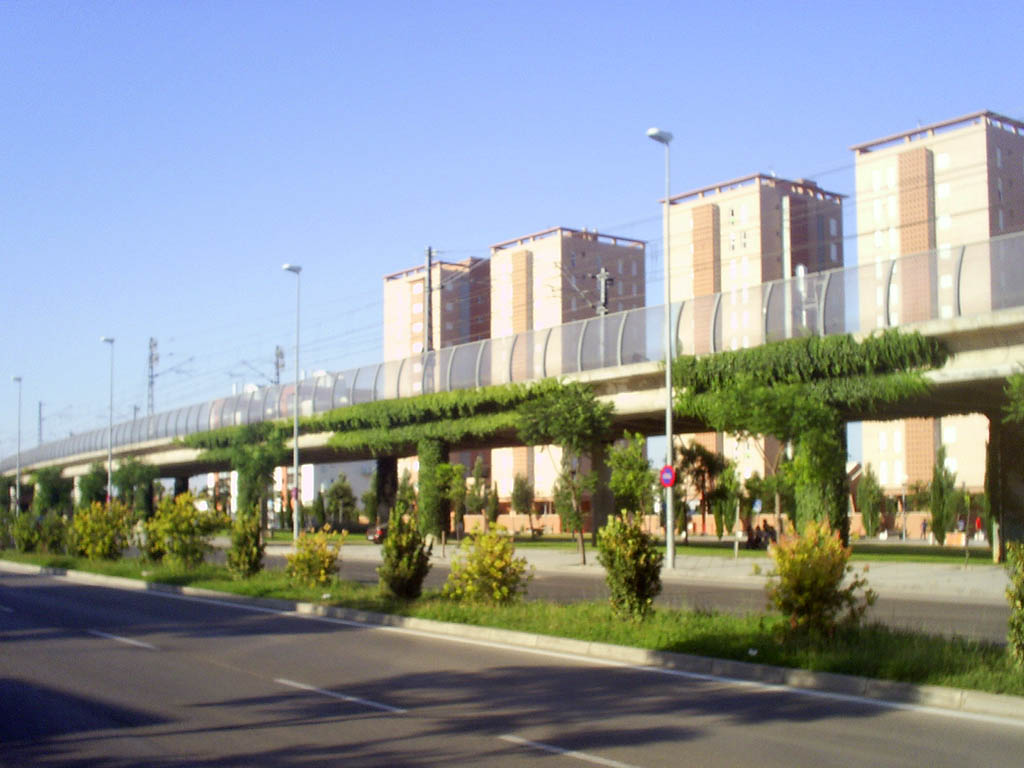
- Elevated tracks in Jerez de la Frontera

Overview
- Owner: Renfe
- Locale: Cádiz, Jerez de la Frontera
- Transit type: Commuter rail
- Number of lines: 2
- Number of stations: 13
- Annual ridership: 2.667 million (2018)

Operation
- Operator: Cercanías

Technical
- System length: 61 km (38 mi)

Cercanías Cádiz is the commuter rail service in the cities of Cádiz and Jerez de la Frontera in Andalucia, Spain. The service consists of two lines of 14 stations over 61 km of track, serving 2.8 million passengers a year.

== History ==
Suburban trains began service in Cádiz in the 1980s. In 2000, work began to place the railway line leading into Cádiz underground to enable double-tracking and create a new linear park in the city. During this work, Cádiz railway station was temporarily closed with Cortadura serving as a terminus in the meantime. In 2002 the work was completed, with the reopening of Cádiz station and new underground stations San Severiano, Segunda Aguada and Estadio spaced apart at a distance resembling a metro.

== Route ==
The service mainly uses the Alcázar de San Juan–Cádiz main line, with a branch to the University of Cádiz from Las Aletas. The section of track between Cádiz railway station and Cortadura station was doubled and put underground in 2001, with the opening of new underground stations at San Severiano, Segunda Aguada and Estadio.

== Stations ==
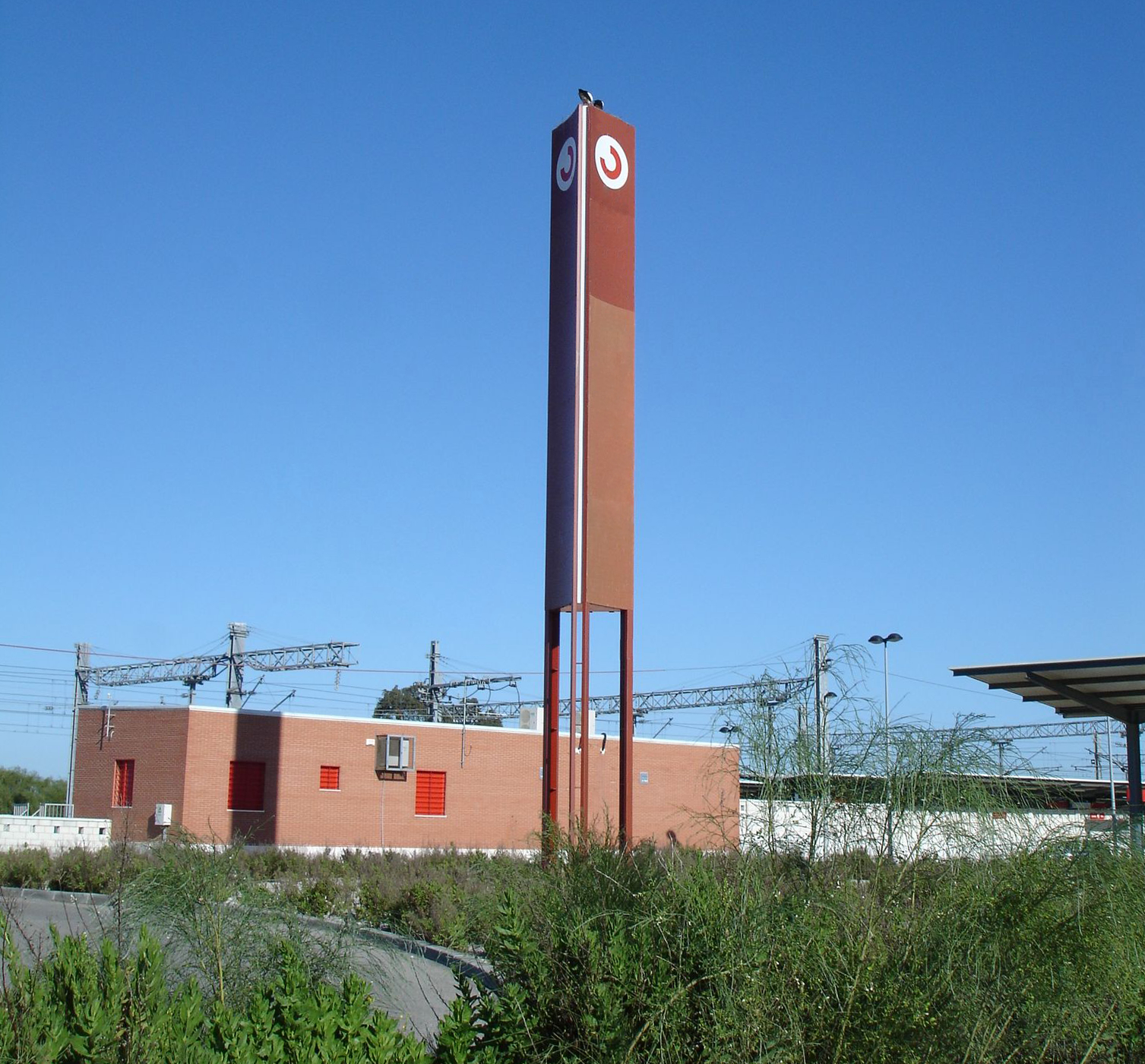
Las Aletas station in Puerto Real.

Of the thirteen stations on the network, the busiest in 2018 was Jerez de la Frontera with 592,000 passengers, followed by Cádiz and San Fernando (350,000 passengers each), El Puerto de Santa María (297,000), Bahía Sur (288,000) and Puerto Real (240,000).

line	route	km
	Cádiz - Aeropuerto de Jerez	58
	Las Aletas - Universidad	2.4

station	line	services	zone	locality
Aeropuerto de Jerez			5	Jerez de la Frontera
Cádiz			1	Cádiz
Cortadura			1	Cádiz
El Puerto de Santa María			4	El Puerto de Santa María
Estadio			1	Cádiz
Jerez de la Frontera			5	Jerez de la Frontera
Las Aletas			3	Puerto Real
Puerto Real			3	Puerto Real
Río Arillo			2	San Fernando
San Fernando-Centro			2	San Fernando
San Fernando-Bahía Sur			2	San Fernando
San Severiano			1	Cádiz
Segunda Aguada			1	Cádiz
Universidad			3	Puerto Real

== Future development ==
The construction of the La Pepa Station in Jerez will start soon.
