= Linares Baeza–Almería railway =

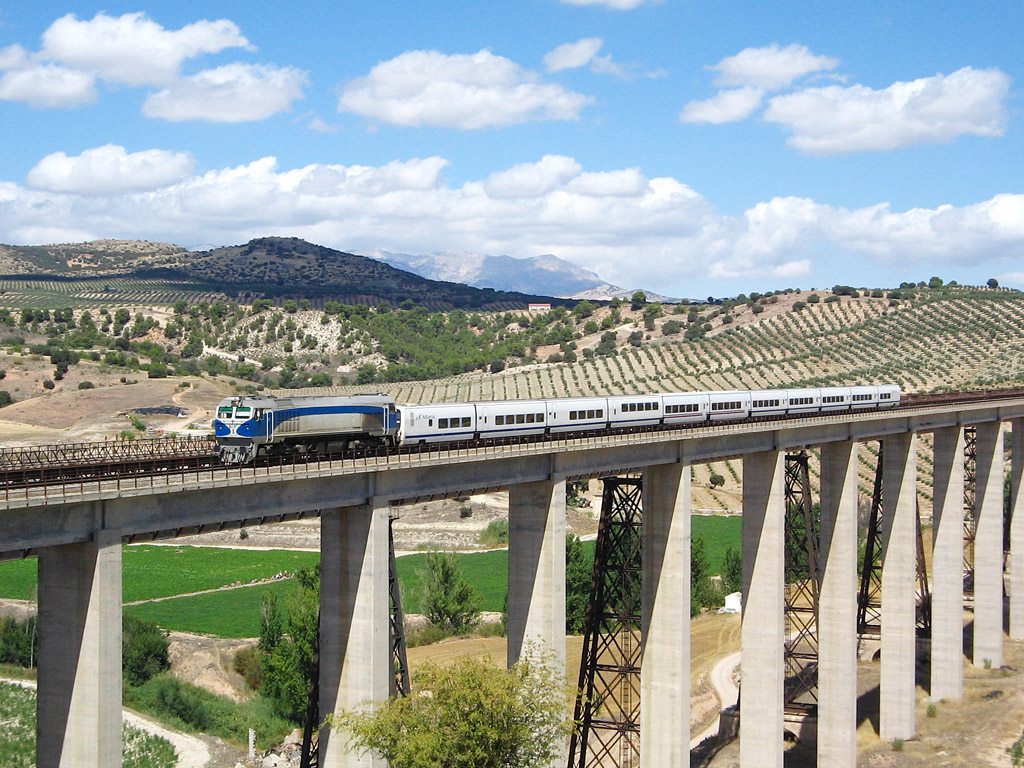
- Hacho Bridge

Overview
- Status: Operational
- Owner: Adif
- Termini: Linares-Baeza; Almería

Service
- Operator(s): Renfe Operadora

Technical
- Line length: 250 km (160 mi)
- Track gauge: 1,668 mm (5 ft 5 21/32 in) Iberian gauge

The Linares Baeza–Almería railway is an Iberian-gauge railway line in Spain. It branches from the Alcázar de San Juan–Cádiz railway at Linares and terminates in Almería. It is currently the main line linking Madrid to Almería.

== Route ==
The line runs through the provinces of Jaén, Granada and Almería. The route formerly crossed an iron bridge, Hacho Bridge, which was the longest iron viaduct on the Spanish rail network. The old bridge has been preserved, but the railway uses a modern bridge built to take heavier weights.

== Services ==
The line is used by all trains from Almería to Madrid, with the full journey taking around six hours. To continue to Madrid from Linares, the line uses the Alcázar de San Juan–Cádiz railway as far as Alcázar de San Juan, and the Madrid–Valencia railway to Madrid Chamartín.

== Future ==
Almería railway station will be linked to the AVE high-speed rail network by the Murcia–Almería high-speed rail line, which is under construction. This will allow a 3.5 hour journey to Madrid, compared to over six hours using the Linares Baeza–Almería railway, which will therefore decrease in importance.
