= Beyond the Quadra Zone =

Play-by-mail space exploration game

- Publishers: Quest Games, Inc
- Years active: 1984 to unknown
- Genres: science fiction, play-by-mail
- Languages: English
- Playing time: open-ended
- Materials required: Instructions, order sheets, turn results, paper, pencil
- Media type: Play-by-mail

Beyond the Quadra Zone (or BQZ) is an open-ended, computer-moderated science fiction, play-by-mail (PBM) game. It was published by Quest Games, Inc.

== History and development ==
Beyond the Quadra Zone was a mid-complexity, open-ended, science fiction PBM game. One reviewer called it a "power game". Quest Games, Inc. published the game, which drew from the design of Universe II. It was computer-moderated with some human assistance.

== Gameplay ==
The game setting is outer space in the year 2615. As starship captains, players explored space and collected resources. Beyond the charted regions of space, the uncharted "quadra zone" was newly accessible for exploration. The elements of gameplay included combat.

== Reception ==
A reviewer in the Summer–Fall 1984 issue of Gaming Universal rated the game "excellent" at four of five stars, stating "I recommend Beyond the Quadra Zone highly." In late 1984, David Webber, the editor of Paper Mayhem magazine reviewed the game, saying it "has quickly become one of my favorite PBM games".

== See also ==
- List of play-by-mail games

== Bibliography ==
- Editors (Summer–Fall 1984). "Gamealog: Beyond the Quadra Zone". Gaming Universal. No. 3–4. p. 56.
- Editors (July–August 1984). "Gameline: Beyond the Quadra Zone". Paper Mayhem. No. 7. p. 23.
- Webber, David (November–December 1984). "Beyond the Quadra Zone". Paper Mayhem. No. 9. pp. 4–9.
- Hainly, John F. (May–June 1985). "Strategy Advice for Beyond the Quadra Zone". Paper Mayhem. No. 12. p. 25.
