= Jaén railway station =

Railway station in Jaén, Spain

Coordinates: 40°4′0″N 2°8′0″W

Jaén
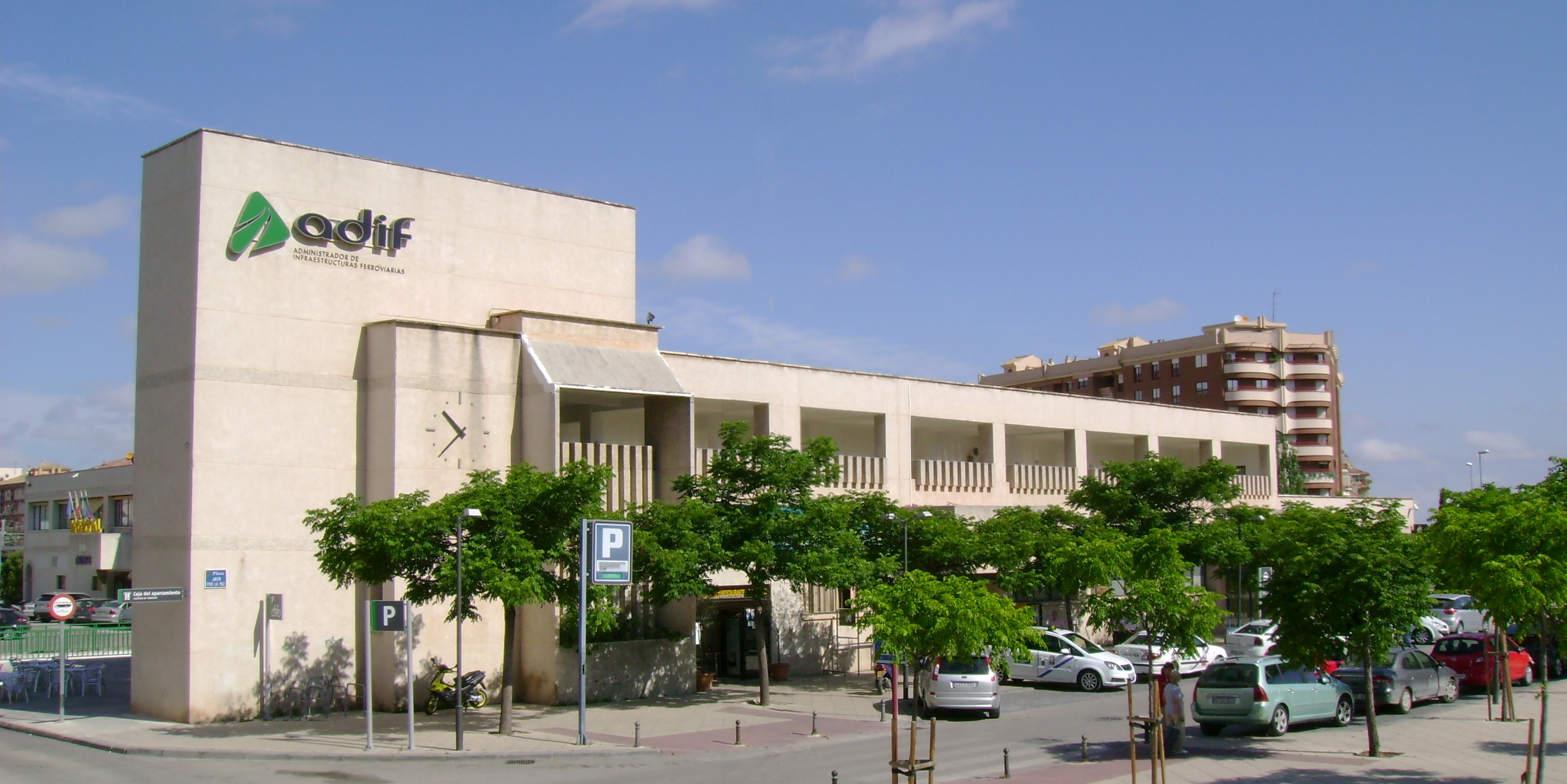

General information
- Owner: Adif
- Operator: Renfe

Passengers
- 516,265 (2024)
Location

Jaén Railway Station (IATA: JEA) is a railway station serving Jaén, Spain. This station is 1 kilometre (0.62 mi) north from the city centre, on a branch from the Alcázar de San Juan–Cádiz railway. The station is operated by Renfe and part of Adif and high-speed rail systems.

== Services ==
The station is served by Renfe Media Distancia services to Madrid Chamartín and Cádiz, providing travellers with frequent connections every day.

Preceding station	Renfe Operadora	Following station
Linares-Baeza towards Madrid Chamartín	Media Distancia	Terminus
Espeluy towards Cádiz	Media Distancia	Terminus
