= Cádiz railway station =

Spanish railway station

Cádiz
- Station interior

General information
- Location: Cádiz, Andalusia, Spain
- Coordinates: 36.5279°N 6.2868°W
- Owner: Adif
- Operator: Renfe
- Line: Alcázar de San Juan–Cádiz railway

Passengers
- 2024: 1,619,183
Location

Cádiz railway station is the main railway station of the Spanish city of Cádiz, Andalusia. It served over 1.6 million passengers in 2024.

== Services ==
Alvia services use the Madrid–Seville high-speed rail line as far as Seville-Santa Justa, and switches to the conventional rail network to serve Jerez and finally Cádiz, and Media Distancia services operate between Cádiz and Jaén and another to Córdoba. The Cercanías Cádiz commuter rail line also serves the station.

Preceding station	Renfe Operadora	Following station
San Fernando-Bahía Sur towards Madrid Puerta de Atocha	Alvia	Terminus
San Fernando-Bahía Sur towards Santander	Alvia	Terminus
San Fernando-Bahía Sur towards Gijón	Alvia	Terminus
Segunda Aguada towards Seville-Santa Justa	Media Distancia 65	Terminus
San Fernando-Bahía Sur towards Jaén	Media Distancia	Terminus
Preceding station	Cercanías Cádiz	Following station
Terminus	C-1	San Severiano towards Aeropuerto de Jerez
Preceding station	Cádiz Bay tram-train	Following station
Terminus	T-1	San Severiano towards Pelagatos
