= Badajoz railway station =

Railway station in Badajoz, Spain

Coordinates: 38°53′26″N 6°58′53″W

Badajoz
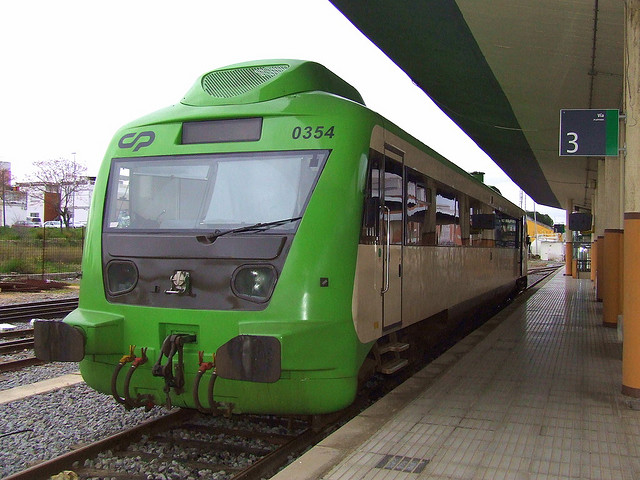

General information
- Owner: adif
- Operator: Renfe

Passengers
- 2018: 125,198
Location

Badajoz railway station (IATA: BQZ) is the central railway station of Badajoz, Spain. Commonly referred locally as the Renfe station, the station is part of Adif and high-speed rail systems: it is located at the western part of the Southwest–Portuguese high speed line.

== Railway service ==
The station accommodates RENFE long-distance and medium-distance trains (AVE). It is part of the proposed Lisbon–Madrid high-speed rail line, the first (resp. last) Spanish railway station after (resp. before) the Portugal part.

In August 2017 Comboios de Portugal (CP), the Portuguese national railway company, restarted an international passenger train service to/from Portugal. A daily return service links Badajoz with Entroncamento, with connections to Lisbon and Porto.
