= Alcázar de San Juan–Cádiz railway =

Overview
- Status: Operational
- Owner: Adif
- Termini: Alcázar de San Juan; Cádiz

Service
- Operator: Renfe Operadora

Technical
- Line length: 576.9 km (358.5 mi)
- Track gauge: 1,668 mm (5 ft 5 21/32 in) Iberian gauge

The Alcázar de San Juan–Cádiz railway is an important Iberian-gauge railway line in Spain. It branches from the Madrid–Valencia railway at Alcázar de San Juan and terminates in Cádiz. It was once the only line linking Madrid to Seville, but now primarily serves local commuter rail services and regional traffic since the opening of the Madrid–Seville high-speed rail line in 1992.

== Route ==
The line serves major Spanish cities including Córdoba, Seville, Jerez de la Frontera and Cádiz; along with a small branch to Jaén at Linares–Baeza, and a second after Linares to Almería of around 250 km (160 mi). The line also branches off at Córdoba as the Córdoba–Málaga railway. In October 2015 the section of the line between Seville and to Cádiz was upgraded to high-speed standard after 14 years of works and put in service by Alvia trains for speeds up to 200 km/h.

== Services ==
The line is used by Cercanías Madrid's C-3 service, the C-1 and C-4 of Cercanías Sevilla and the C-1 of Cercanías Cádiz; along with numerous regional services along various stretches of the line. A Larga Distancia service runs the full distance between Madrid and Seville (although not all the way to Cádiz), taking 7 hours and 41 minutes; since the opening of the AVE high-speed rail line travel has been reduced to 2 hours and 21 minutes non-stop, freeing up the older slower line for other traffic.
