= Rail transport in Catalonia =

Railway system in Catalonia

Catalonia
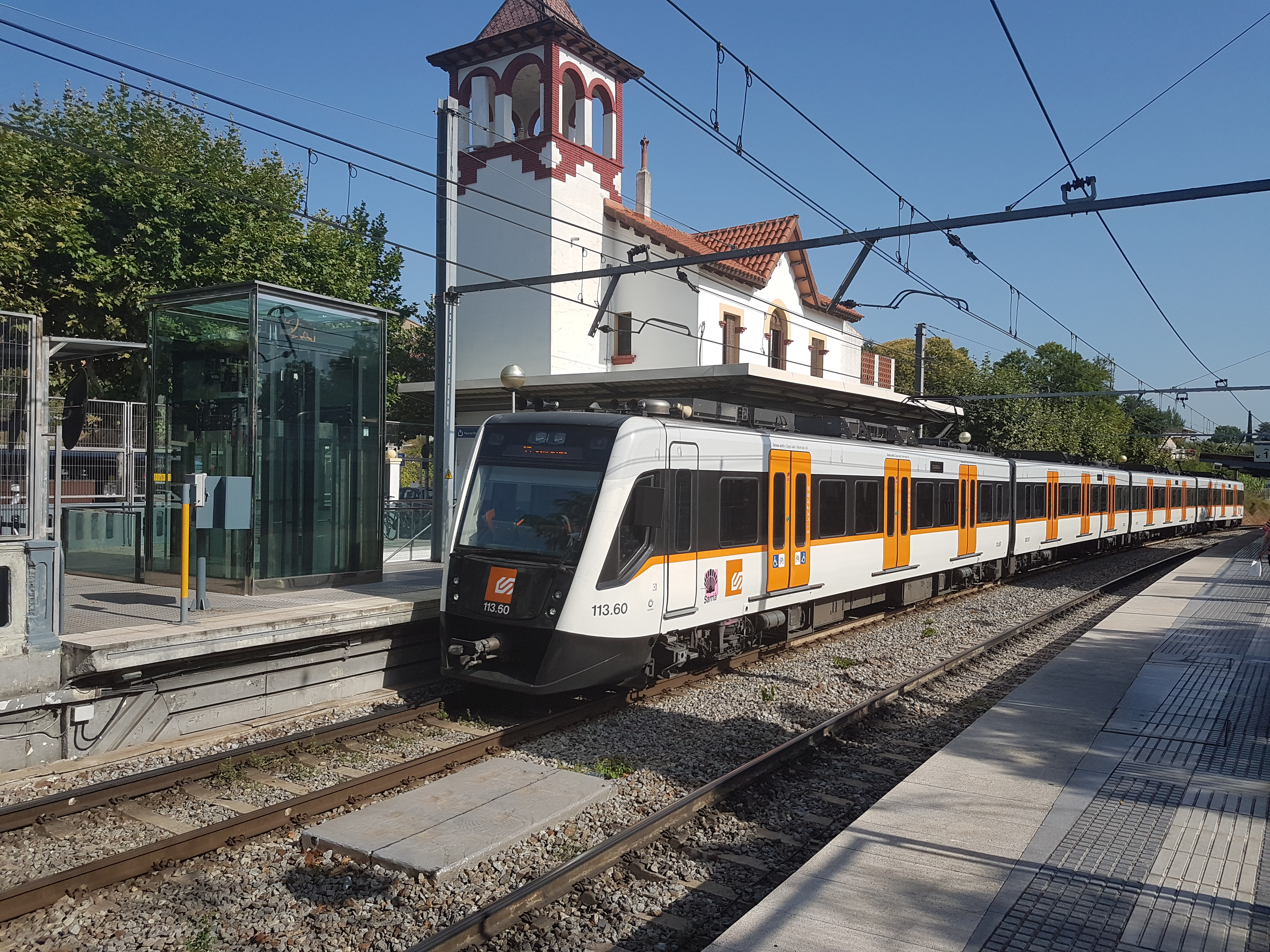
- An FGC 113 series at Valldoreix station

Operation
- National railway: FGC
- Infrastructure company: Ifercat and Adif
- Major operators: FGC, Renfe, Ouigo and Iryo

Statistics
- Ridership: 235.7 million (Generalitat de Catalunya, 2019)
- Freight: 6.8 million tons per year (Generalitat de Catalunya, 2019)

System length
- Total: Total 1,865 km (1,159 mi), FGC 297 km (185 mi), Renfe 1,568 km (974 mi)

Features
- No. of stations: 316 (110 served by FGC and 206 served by Renfe)
Map
- Suburban rail system of Barcelona as of 2023

Rail transport in Catalonia operates on three rail gauges and services are operated by a variety of public operators:

- Ferrocarrils de la Generalitat de Catalunya lines (FGC):
  - Metro de Barcelona lines
  - Línia Barcelona-Vallès
  - Llobregat–Anoia line
- Broad gauge lines (Renfe):
  - Rodalies Barcelona lines
  - Regional lines (Mitjana distància in Catalan)
  - Long-distance lines (Llarga distància)
- Transports Metropolitans de Barcelona lines (TMB):
  - Metro de Barcelona
- Tramway lines:
  - Tramvia Blau (TMB)
  - Tram lines (TRAM)
- High speed lines in Catalonia (Renfe)
  - AVE lines (in Standard gauge)
  - High speed trains (in broad gauge)
- Funicular and aerial tramway of Catalonia (Funiculars i telefèrics de Catalunya)

== Transport authorities ==
Catalan transport authorities map.

Transport authorities are inter-administrative voluntary corporations responsible for coordinating the public transportation system. There are currently four transport authorities in Catalonia:

- Autoritat del Transport Metropolità (ATM) in Àmbit metropolità de Barcelona (Barcelona and part of Tarragona and Girona).
- Autoritat Territorial de la Mobilitat del Camp de Tarragona (ATM Camp de Tarragona) in Camp de Tarragona.
- Autoritat Territorial de la Mobilitat de l'Àrea de Lleida (ATM Àrea de Lleida) in some parts of Lleida.
- Autoritat Territorial de la Mobilitat de l'Àrea de Girona (ATM Àrea de Girona) ) in some parts of Comarques Gironines.
- In project:
  - Autoritat Territorial de la Mobilitat de les Comarques Centrals (ATM Comarques Centrals) in Comarques Centrals.

== Rodalies de Barcelona ==
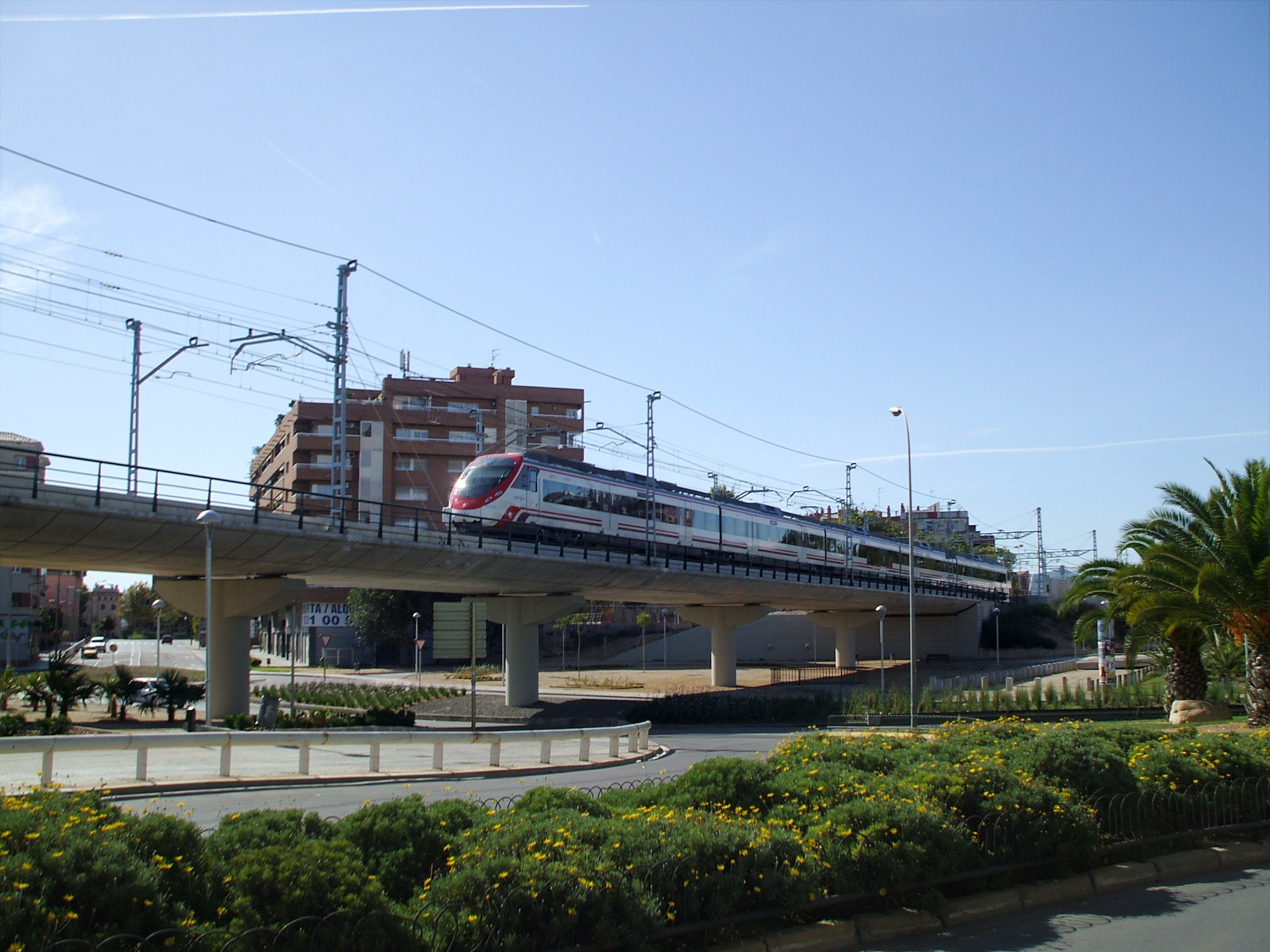
New Cornellà station entrance

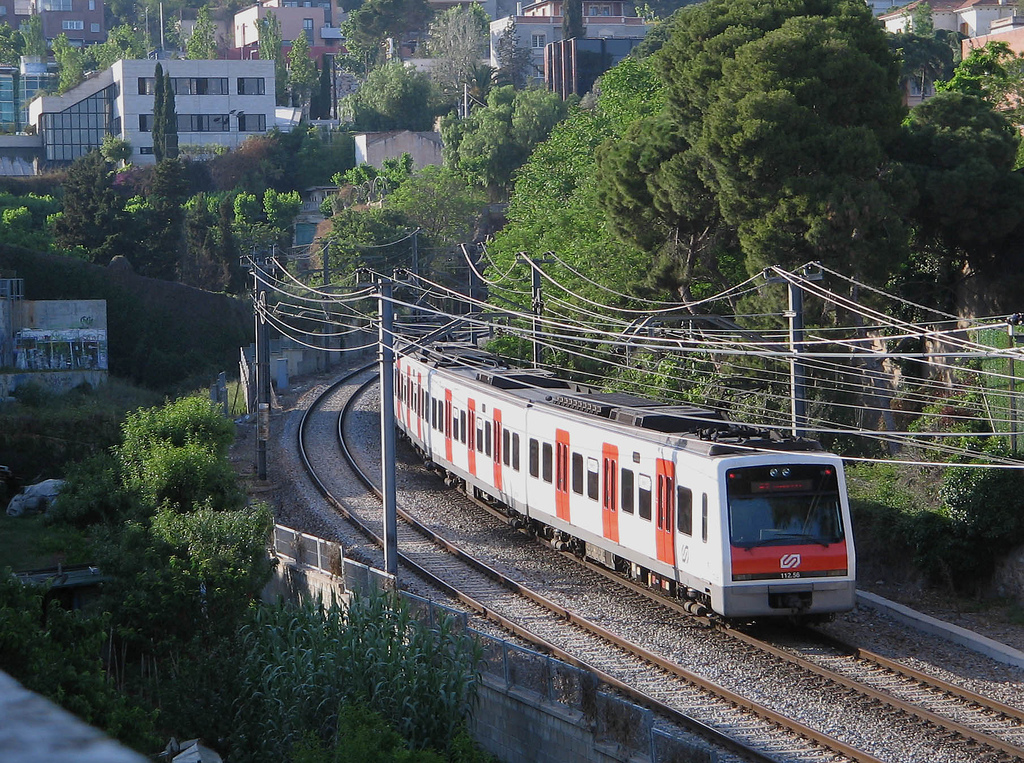
112 FGC train stock

Rodalies Barcelona is the principal element of Barcelona metropolitan area transport and in some municipalities of Girona and Tarragona.

There are 15 lines (R1-R2-R3-R4-R7-R10-S1-S2-S5-S55-S1-S8-S33-R5-R6) operated by:

- Renfe Operadora : 6 lines (broad gauge).
  - Molins de Rei - L'Hospitalet de Llobregat - Mataró - Blanes - Maçanet-Massanes (via Barcelona Plaça Catalunya)
  - St. Vicenç Calders - Vilanova i la Geltrú - Castelldefels - Granollers Centre - St Celoni - Maçanet-Massanes (via Bcn Passeig de Gràcia)
  - L'Hospitalet de Llobregat - Vic - Ripoll - Puigcerdà - La Tor de Querol (via Barcelona Plaça Catalunya)
  - Sant Vicenç de Calders - Vilafranca del Penedès - Martorell - Terrassa - Manresa (via Barcelona Plaça Catalunya)
  - L'Hospitalet de Llobregat - Martorell (via Cerdanyola-Universitat and Barcelona Plaça Catalunya)
  - Martorell Central - Granollers Centre (via Cerdanyola-Universitat)
- Ferrocarrils de la Generalitat de Catalunya: 2 lines (standard gauge) 8 lines (metric gauge).
  - FGC Línia Barcelona-Vallès:
    - Barcelona Plaça Catalunya - Terrassa-Nacions Unides (via Sant Cugat Centre)
    - Barcelona Plaça Catalunya - Sabadell-Parc del Nord (via Sant Cugat Centre)
  - FGC Llobregat–Anoia line:
    - Barcelona Plaça Espanya - Can Ros
    - Barcelona Plaça Espanya - Olesa de Montserrat
    - Barcelona Plaça Espanya - Martorell Enllaç
    - Barcelona Plaça Espanya - Quatre Camins
    - Barcelona Plaça Espanya - Manresa-Baixador
    - Barcelona Plaça Espanya - Manresa-Baixador (semi-direct)
    - Barcelona Plaça Espanya - Igualada
    - Barcelona Plaça Espanya - Igualada (semi-direct)

== Rodalies de Girona ==
Renfe Operadora RG1 line:

- L'Hospitalet de Llobregat - Figueres - Portbou

== Rodalies de Lleida ==
FGC Lleida-La Pobla line:

- Lleida-Pirineus - Balaguer
- Lleida-Pirineus - La Pobla de Segur

== Rodalies de Tarragona ==
Renfe Operadora Tarragona's lines:

- Tarragona - Reus (service suspended due to Covid pandemic and not reactivated yet as of May 2023. The route is covered by Regional Exprés' lines R14 and R15)
- Salou- PortAventura - Tarragona - L'Arboç (service suspended due to Covid pandemic and not reactivated yet as of may 2023. The route is covered by Barcelona's R4 from L'Arboç to Sant Vicenç de Calders and by Regional Exprés' R17 from there to Salou)

The Generalitat de Catalunya is building a tramway system connecting several cities of the Camp de Tarragona, those being Reus, Tarragona, Vila-seca, Cambrils and Salou. This service, the Tramvia del Camp de Tarragona (also called TramCamp) will comprise around 46km of tracks and 47 stations, with a first part of 14km (between Cambrils, Salou and Vila-seca) being finished in 2026 and the Vila-seca - Tarragona and Vila-seca - Reus sections finishing in no longer than 10 years from the initial announcement in 2023. The whole system will be built in Standard-gauge railway and operated by Ferrocarrils de la Generalitat de Catalunya.

== Mitjana distància and Regional Exprés ==
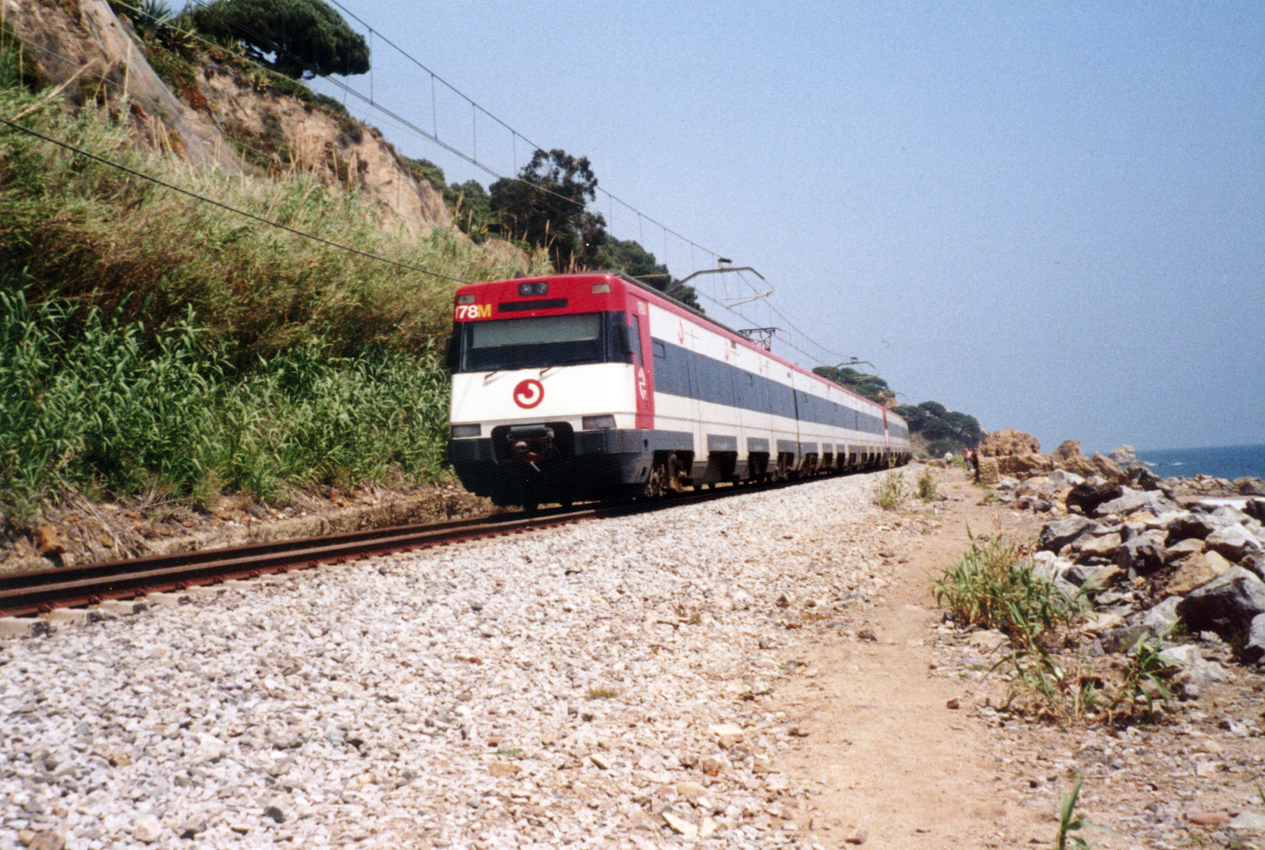
R1 train between Calella and Sant Pol de Mar

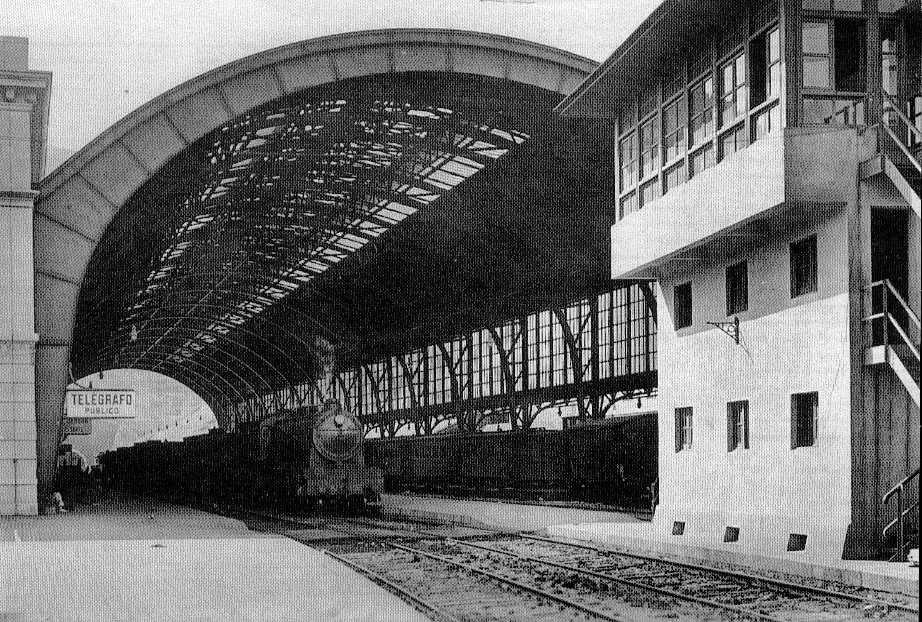
Portbou railway station

Mitjana distància or Regional Exprés: Those lines cover the four Catalan provinces. Lines are operated by:

- Renfe Operadora: 8 lines (broad gauge) and one of standard gauge:
  - Barcelona-Sants - Figueres railway station - Portbou
  - L'Hospitalet de Llobregat - Lleida-Pirineus (via Barcelona, Sabadell, Terrassa, Manresa, Cervera and Mollerussa)
  - Barcelona-França - Lleida-Pirineus (via Roda de Berà, Valls and Montblanch)
  - Barcelona-França - Lleida-Pirineus (via Tarragona and Reus)
  - Barcelona-França - Riba-roja d'Ebre (via Tarragona and Reus)
  - Barcelona-França - Tortosa (with some expeditions to Vinaròs and València-Nord)
  - Barcelona-França - Tarragona - Salou- PortAventura
  - Avant Barcelona Sants - Camp de Tarragona - Lleida-Pirineus
  - Avant Barcelona Sants - Camp de Tarragona - Tortosa
  - Avant Barcelona Sants - Girona - Figueres-Vilafant

== Llarga distància ==
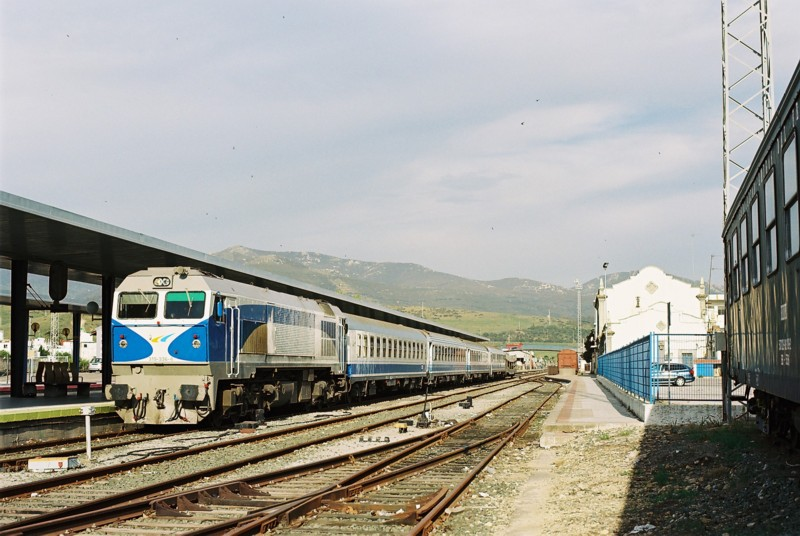
Estrella train

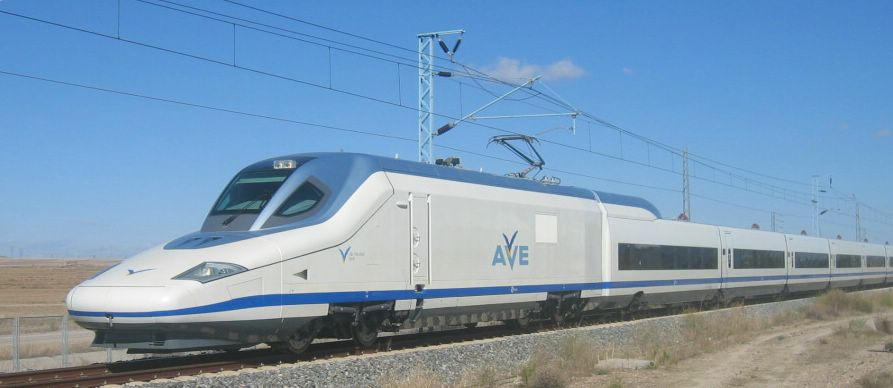
Talgo 350 - AVE

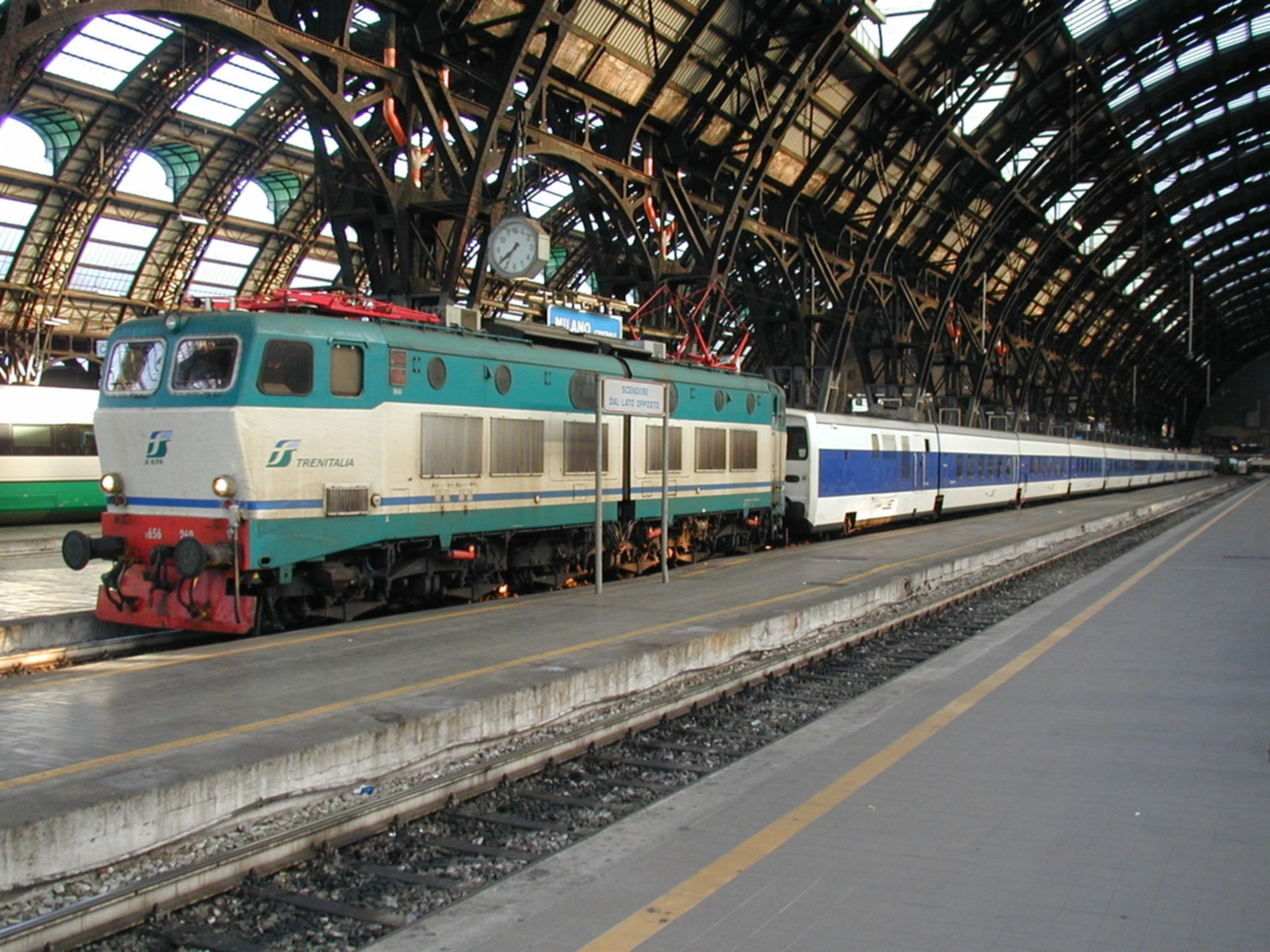
Trenhotel Salvador Dalí

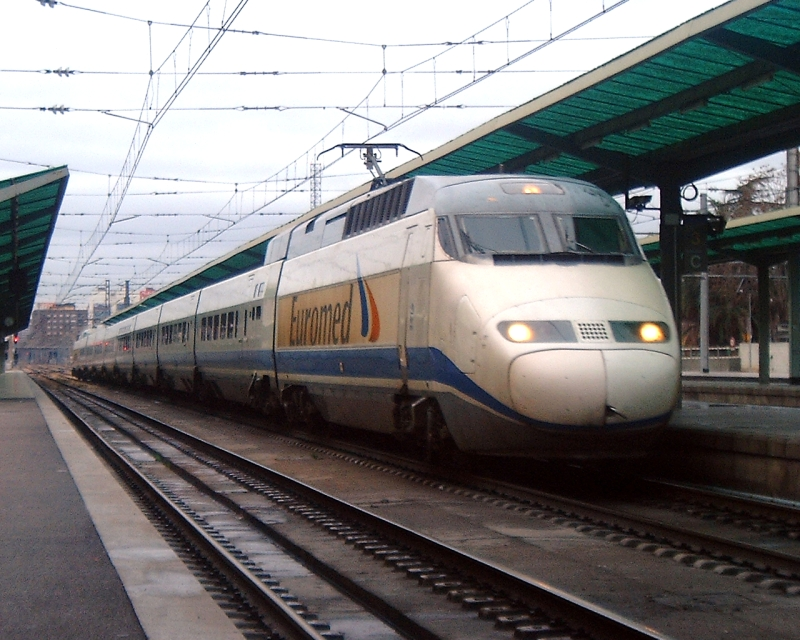
Euromed to València Nord station

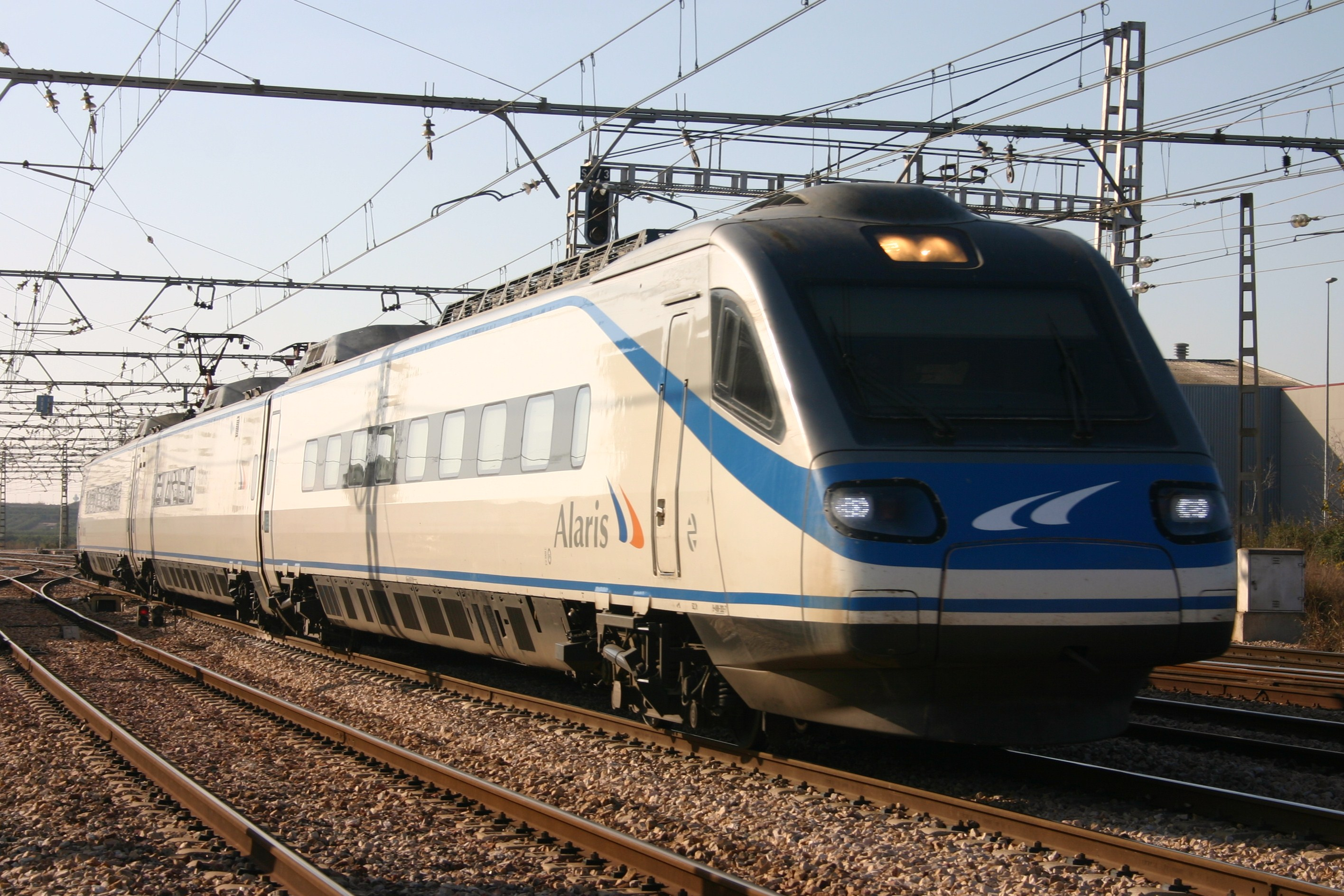
Alaris to Silla (València).

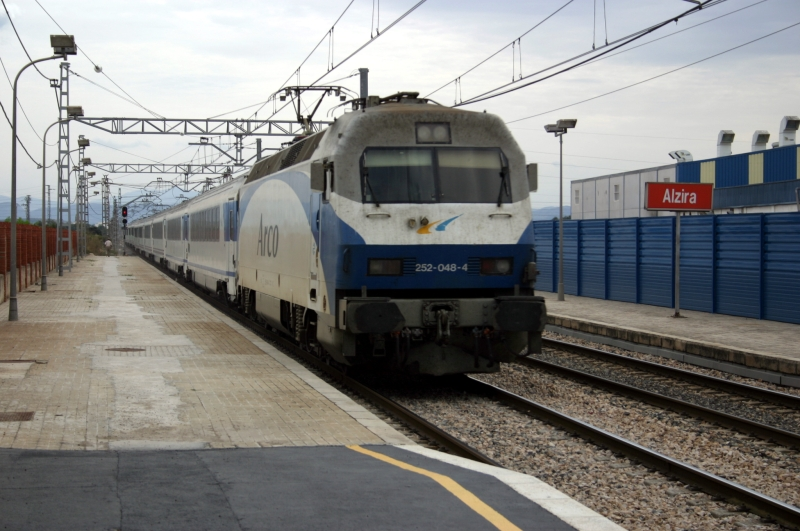
Arco García Lorca to Alzira (València).

Llarga distància or Larga distancia (in Catalan or Castilian) are Renfe lines that used other Renfe lines, mitjana distància or Rodalies, and connect Catalonia with other Spanish towns or European cities. Some of them are high speed lines.

- Estrella (120 km/h):
  - Costa Brava: Madrid Chamartín · Alcalá de Henares · Guadalajara · Sigüenza · Arcos de Jalón · Calatayud · La Puebla de Híjar · Casp · Flix · Móra la Nova · Reus · Tarragona · Sant Vicenç de Calders · Barcelona Sants · Granollers Centre · Caldes de Malavella · Girona · Flaçà · Figueres · Llançà · Portbou · Cervera de la Marenda
  - Galicia: Barcelona Sants · Tarragona · Reus · Lleida-Pirineus · Montsó-Riu Cinca · Saragossa-Delicias · Tudela de Navarra · Castejón de Ebro · Logronyo · Burgos · Palència · Lleó · Astorga · Ponferrada · O Barco de Valdeorras · A Rúa-Petín · San Clodio-Quiroga · Monforte de Lemos >
    - La Corunya branch: Sarria · Lugo · Curtis · Betanzos-Infesta · La Corunya-San Cristóbal
    - Vigo branch: Ourense-Empalme · Guillarei · O Porriño · Redondela de Galícia · Vigo
  - Pío Baroja: Barcelona Sants · Tarragona · Reus · Lleida-Pirineus · Montsó-Riu Cinca · Saragossa-Delicias >
    - Bilbao branch: Tudela de Navarra · Castejón de Ebro · Calahorra · Logronyo · Miranda de Ebro · Llodio · Bilbao-Abando
    - Asturias branch: Tudela de Navarra · Castejón de Ebro · Calahorra · Logronyo · Miranda de Ebre · Burgos · Palència · Sahagún · Lleó · Pola de Lena · Mieres-Puente · Oviedo · Gijón-Jovellanos · Gijón-Cercanías
    - Hendaia branch: Tudela de Navarra · Castejón de Ebro · Tafalla · Pamplona · Alsasua · Zumárraga · Beasaín · Tolosa · Sant Sebastià · Irun · Hendaia
    - Salamanca branch: Tudela · Castejón de Ebro · Calahorra · Logronyo · Miranda de Ebro · Burgos · Palència · Valladolid-Campo Grande · Medina del Campo · Cantalapiedra · Salamanca
- Talgo
  - Català Talgo: Barcelona Sants - Montpeller-Saint Roch
  - Mare Nostrum: Cartagena/Llorca - Montpeller-Saint Roch
  - Miguel de Unamuno: Barcelona Sants - País Basc/Salamanca
  - Barcelona Sants - Llorca
  - Barcelona Sants - Múrcia
- Alvia
  - Barcelona-Sants · Camp de Tarragona · Lleida Pirineus · Saragossa-Delicias · Tudela · Castejón de Ebro · Tafalla · Pamplona · Vitoria-Gasteiz · Miranda de Ebro · Burgos · Palencia · Sahagún · León · Astorga · Bembibre · Ponferrada · O Barco de Valdeorras · A Rua-Petín · San Clodio-Quiroga · Monforte de Lemos · Ourense-Empalme · O Porriño · Redondela · Vigo
- Trenhotel
  - Antonio Machado: Barcelona-Sants · Tarragona · València-La Font de Sant Lluís · Còrdova Central · Sevilla-Santa Justa · Jerez de la Frontera · El Puerto de Santa María · Cadis
  - Gibralfaro:
    - ruta Màlaga: Barcelona Sants · Tarragona · Salou · Vinaròs · Castelló de la Plana · València Nord · Almansa · Albacete · Alcázar de San Juan · Linares-Baeza · Espeluy · Andújar · Còrdova Central · Montilla · Puente Genil · Bobadilla · Màlaga-María Zambrano
    - ruta Granada: Barcelona Sants · Tarragona · Salou · Vinaròs · Castelló de la Plana · València Nord · Almansa · Albacete · Alcázar de San Juan · Linares-Baeza · Jódar-Úbeda · Moreda · Iznalloz · Granada
  - Joan Miró: Barcelona Estació de França · Girona · Figueres · Limoges · Orleans-Les Aubrais · París Austerlitz
  - Pau Casals: Barcelona Estació de França · Girona · Figueres · Perpinyà · Ginebra · Lausana · Friburgo de Brisgovia · Berna · Zuric Central
  - Salvador Dalí: Barcelona Estació de França · Girona · Figueres · Perpinyà · Torí Porta Susa · Milà Centrale
- Euromed (220 km/h):
  - Barcelona - Alacant: Sagrera (2010) · Barcelona Sants · Tarragona · Castelló de la Plana · València Nord · Alacant Terminal
- Alaris (160–200 km/h) (490 o 120 Renfe stock):
  - Barcelona - València: Barcelona Estació de França · Barcelona Sants · Tarragona · Salou · L'Aldea-Amposta-Tortosa · Vinaròs · Benicarló-Peníscola · Orpesa del Mar · Benicàssim · Castelló de la Plana · Sagunt · València Nord
  - Barcelona - Alacant: (Estacions Alaris: Barcelona - València) · Alacant Terminal
- Arco (200 km/h):
  - García Lorca: Barcelona Sants · Sant Vicenç de Calders ·Tarragona · Salou · L'Aldea-Amposta-Tortosa · Vinaròs · Benicarló-Peñíscola · Castelló de la Plana · València Nord · Xàtiva · Albacete · Villarrobledo · Socuéllamos · Alcázar de San Juan · Extremadura / Almería / Granada / Sevilla / Màlaga

=== Alta Velocidad Española ===
High speed lines are operated by Renfe in a commercial branch called Alta Velocidad Española (AVE). Those lines run on new standard gauge railways.

- Barcelona Sants - Zaragoza-Delicias: via Lleida-Pirineus, el Camp de Tarragona.
- Barcelona Sants - Madrid-Puerta de Atocha
- Barcelona Sants - Málaga-María Zambrano
- Barcelona Sants - Sevilla-Santa Justa

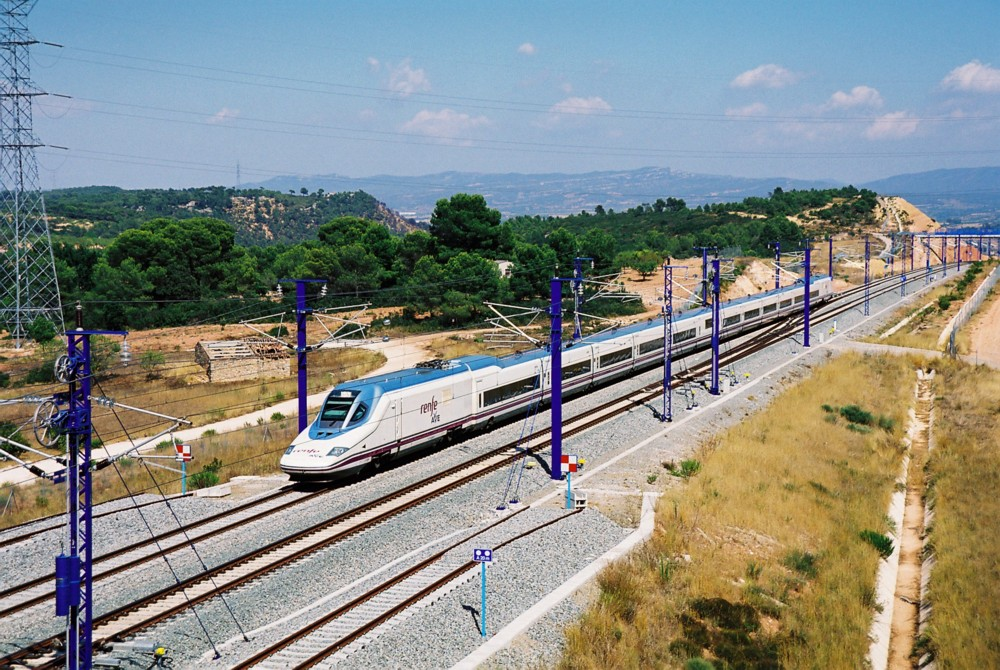
102-014 stock to Montblanc station

=== Railway gauge ===
Most of Catalan's railway gauge is broad gauge, as in other parts of Spain, and new railways are built in standard gauge to be able to connect with European railways; therefore, some stations exist where trains can change gauges. Currently, there are only two stations in Catalonia with that capability:

- Portbou: Talgo system.
- Roda de Barà: Talgo and Brava-CAF systems.

== Metropolitan railways ==
Barcelona metro map

There are 11 metropolitan lines in Barcelona (L1-L2-L3-L4-L5-L6-L7-L8-L9-L10-L11) operated by:

- Transports Metropolitans de Barcelona: 7 underground lines, one of them in old Spanish broad gauge (line 1); the others have standard gauge.
  - (Opened on 1926 called Ferrocarril Metropolità Transversal de Barcelona) Hospital de Bellvitge - Fondo
  - (Opened on 1995) Paral·lel - Badalona Pompeu Fabra
  - (Opened on 1924 called Gran Metropolità de Barcelona) Zona Universitària - Trinitat Nova
  - (Opened on 1973) Trinitat Nova - La Pau
  - (Opened in 1969) Cornellà Centre - Vall d'Hebron
  - (Line 9 will open partially in September 2009 and totally in 2014) Aeroport-Terminal sud - Can Zam
  - (Line 9 branch) Zona Franca ZAL - Gorg
  - (Opened in 2003) Trinitat Nova - Can Cuiàs
- Ferrocarrils de la Generalitat de Catalunya:
  - Metro del Vallès:
    - (Opened in 1863) Plaça Catalunya - Reina Elisenda.
    - (Opened in 1954) Plaça Catalunya - Avinguda Tibidabo.
  - Metro del Baix Llobregat:
    - (Opened in 1912) Plaça Espanya - Molí Nou-Ciutat Cooperativa.

Metro de Barcelona
Name	Color	Terminal	Terminal	Opened	First service	Operator	Km	Stations	Time (m)	Gauge (mm)
L1	Red	Hospital de Bellvitge	Fondo	1926	1926	TMB	20'7	30	35	1674
L2	Purple	Paral·lel	Badalona Pompeu Fabra	1995	1959	TMB	13'5	17	24	1435
L3	Green	Zona Universitària	Trinitat Nova	1924	1924	TMB	18'5	26	36	1435
L4	Yellow	Trinitat Nova	La Pau	1973	1926	TMB	16'7	22	36	1435
L5	Blue	Cornellà Centre	Vall d'Hebron	1959	1959	TMB	16'6	23	37	1435
L6	Navy blue	Plaça Catalunya	Reina Elisenda	1929	1863^{4}	FGC	5'2	9	14	1435
L7	Brown	Plaça Catalunya	Avinguda Tibidabo	1954	1863^{4}	FGC	4'63	7	10	1435
L8	Pink	Plaça Espanya	Molí Nou-C.C.	2000	1912	FGC	12	11	21	1000
L9	Orange	Terminal Sud	Can Zam	2009-14	-	TMB	47'8	39 (51)	-	1435
L10	Light blue	Gorg	Polígon Pratenc	2009-14	-	TMB	-	32	-	1435
L11	Light green	Trinitat Nova	Can Cuiàs	2003	2003	TMB	2'1	5	6	1435

== Territory ==
Nowadays there are 32 comarcas (group of municipalities) with some kind of rail service; 14 of those have Rodalies Barcelona and/or FGC services. There are comarcas with medium- or long-distance stations and nine comarcas without rail service.

Comarcas (rodalies and/or MD and/or LD):

- Alt Penedès
- Anoia
- Bages
- Baix Llobregat
- Baix Penedès
- Baixa Cerdanya
- Barcelonès
- Garraf
- Maresme
- Osona
- Ripollès
- Selva
- Vallès Occidental
- Vallès Oriental

Comarcas (MD or LD):

- Alt Camp
- Alt Empordà
- Baix Camp
- Baix Ebre
- Conca de Barberà
- Garrigues
- Gironès
- Montsià
- Noguera
- Pallars Jussà
- Pla d'Urgell
- Priorat
- Ribera d'Ebre
- Segarra
- Segrià
- Tarragonès
- Terra Alta
- Urgell

Comarcas without service:

- Alt Urgell
- Alta Ribagorça
- Baix Empordà
- Berguedà
- Garrotxa
- Pallars Sobirà
- Pla de l'Estany
- Solsonès
- Vall d'Aran
