= ATM (disambiguation) =

ATM, or automated teller machine, is a device used to perform financial transactions.

ATM or atm may also refer to:

== Arts, entertainment and media ==
- ATM (TV series), a 2023 Indian Telugu-language TV series
- ATM (film), a 2012 American horror thriller film
- ATM: Er Rak Error, a 2012 Thai film
- Azhagiya Tamil Magan, a 2007 Indian film
- "ATM" (J. Cole song), 2018
- "ATM" (Don Toliver song), 2026
- Amateur Telescope Making, a series of books by Albert G. Ingalls 1926–1953
- ATM (play), by Brendan Cowell, 2002

== Businesses and organizations ==
- Abiding Truth Ministries, an American anti-LGBT organization
- Acrylic Tank Manufacturing, an American aquarium manufacturer, televised in Tanked
- Association of Teachers of Mathematics, United Kingdom
- African Transformation Movement, South African political party founded in 2018
- The a2 Milk Company, New Zealand ticker symbol ATM

== People ==
- A. T. M. Wilson (1906–1978), English psychiatrist
- Abu Taher Mohammad, Abu Tayeb Muhammad or Abu Talib Muhammad, popular combinations of given names, often abbreviated to A.T.M., including a list of people with the names

== Science and technology ==
- ATM (computer), a Russian ZX Spectrum clone
- ATM serine/threonine kinase, a serine/threonine kinase activated by DNA damage
- Airborne Topographic Mapper, an instrument of NASA's Operation IceBridge
- Adobe Type Manager, software for managing fonts
- Accelerated Turing machine or Zeno machine, a hypothetical computational model
- Alternating Turing machine, a hypothetical computational model
- Apollo Telescope Mount, a solar observatory
- Asynchronous Transfer Mode, a telecommunications protocol used in networking
- Standard atmosphere (unit), symbol atm

== Transportation ==
- Active traffic management, a method of increasing peak capacity on busy major highways
- Air traffic management, ensuring the safe and efficient flow of air traffic
- Altamira Airport, Brazil, IATA code ATM
- Azienda Trasporti Milanesi, the municipal public transport company of Milan, Italy
- Par Avion (airline), in Tasmania, ICAO airline code ATM
- Autoritat del Transport Metropolità ('Metropolitan Transport Authority'), in Barcelona, Spain
- Autoritat Territorial de la Mobilitat del Camp de Tarragona, in Camp de Tarragona, Spain
- Autoritat Territorial de la Mobilitat de l'Àrea de Girona, in Girona, Spain
- Autoritat Territorial de la Mobilitat de l'Àrea de Lleida, in Lleida, Spain

== Other uses ==
- Actun Tunichil Muknal, a Maya archaeological site in Belize
- Armed Forces F.C., earlier known as ATM FA, a football club in Malaysia
- Ass to mouth, a sexual act
- At the money, moneyness where the strike price is the same as the current spot price
- At-the-market offering, a type of follow-on offering of stock
- ATM, "at the moment", in SMS language
- ATM (method) (Indonesian: amati, tiru, modifikasi, lit. 'observe, imitate, modify'), an approach in Indonesia's business sector

== See also ==
- ATMS (disambiguation)
- Texas A&M University, whose lettermark resembles "ATM"
