= Abu Taher Mohammad =

Abu Taher Mohammad, Abu Tayeb Muhammad or Abu Talib Muhammad are popular combinations of given names, often abbreviated to A.T.M.

People with these names include:

- A. T. M. Abdul Mateen (1925–2001), Pakistani politician
- A. T. M. Abdul Wahab, Bangladeshi politician
- ATM Abdullah (born 1973), Bengali Indian politician
- A. T. M. Afzal (fl. from 1976), Bangladeshi chief justice
- ATM Alamgir (1950–2022), Bangladeshi politician
- A. T. M. Amin (fl. 1979–2009), Bangladeshi army officer
- A. T. M. Azharul Islam (born 1952), Bangladeshi politician
- A. T. M. Fazle Kabir (born 1947), Bangladeshi supreme court judge
- Abu Taher Mohammad Haider (1942–1975), Bangladeshi army officer
- A. T. M. Hamidul Hossain Tariq (born 1951), Bangladeshi army officer
- ATM Hemayet Uddin (1955–2019), Bangladeshi Islamic scholar and politician
- A. T. M. Nazimullah Chowdhury (fl. from 1974), Bangladeshi diplomat
- A. T. M. Nurul Bashar Chowdhury (born 1953), Bangladeshi politician
- A. T. M. Rokebul Haque (fl. from 2001), Bangladeshi diplomat
- Abu Taher Md. Saifur Rahman (born 1966), Bangladesh supreme court judge
- A. T. M. Shamsuddin (1927–2009), Bangladeshi journalist
- A. T. M. Shamsul Huda (1943–2025), Bangladeshi chief election commissioner
- A. T. M. Shamsuzzaman (1941–2021), Bangladeshi actor and director
- ATM Syed Hossain (fl. from 1972), Bangladeshi politician
- A. T. M. Wali Ashraf (1937–1994), Bangladeshi politician
- ATM Zafar Alam (1947–1971), Bangladeshi student activist
- Abu Tayeb Muhammad Zahirul Alam (born 1952), Bangladeshi army officer
- A. T. M. Zahurul Huq (died 2017), Bangladeshi academic

== See also ==
- Chowdhury A. T. M. Masud (1924–2013), Bangladeshi judge
- ATM (disambiguation)
