= Association of Professionals in Political Science and Sociology of Catalonia =

- Col·legi de Professionals de la Ciència Política i de la Sociologia de Catalunya
- Abbreviation: COLPIS
- Formation: 1989
- Type: Public-law professional corporation
- Headquarters: Barcelona, Catalonia, Spain
- Region served: Catalonia
- Official language: Catalan
- Dean: Lídia Arroyo Prieto
- Main organ: Governing Board
- Website: https://www.colpis.cat/

The Col·legi de Professionals de la Ciència Política i de la Sociologia de Catalunya (Association of Professionals in Political Science and Sociology of Catalonia, COLPIS) is a non-profit professional organisation constituted as a public law corporation. It provides services and professional support to political scientists, sociologists, and professionals in related fields such as public administration, international relations, and security studies throughout Catalonia.

COLPIS was established in 1989, following the second transitional provision of Law 13/1982 on Regulatory Colleges. Its founding mission was to offer guidance, information services, and support to its members, while promoting the development of Political Science and Sociology within Catalan society.

In September 2020, COLPIS amended its Statutes, introducing several notable changes. The reform expanded membership eligibility to graduates in International Relations, Public Management and Administration, and Security Studies. It also adopted the current, more inclusive name and strengthened the organisation's internal democratic governance mechanisms.

As a professional organization, COLPIS is regularly consulted by public institutions. For example, during the drafting of the preliminary bill on the Catalan External Action and European Union Service, it was one of the relevant organizations consulted by the Catalan Government.

In its activities, COLPIS often cooperates with public institutions. In 2025 COLPIS and the European Parliament Office in Barcelona signed a cooperation agreement.

== Governing bodies ==
COLPIS is governed by a Governing Board, in accordance with its Statutes. The most recent Board elections took place on 17 July 2025.

The current dean of COLPIS is Lídia Arroyo Prieto, assistant professor of social psychology at the Autonomous University of Barcelona.

Since its foundation, COLPIS has been led by the following deans:

- Jesús María Rodés i Gràcia (1989–1992)
- Montserrat Tressera i Pijoan (1992–1999)
- Joan Botella Corral (1999–2005)
- Anna Parés i Rifà (2005–2017)
- Jordi Pacheco i Canals (2017–2025)
- Lídia Arroyo Prieto (2025–present)

== Organisation ==
To fulfil its functions, COLPIS is structured into several working commissions. These operate at both territorial and thematic levels.

Territorial commissions

- Camp de Tarragona Commission
- Central Catalonia Commission
- Girona Commission
- Lleida Commission
- Terres de l'Ebre Commission
- Brussels Commission (responsible for international representation)

Thematic commissions

- Academic Commission
- Childhood and Adolescence Commission
- Digital Society Commission
- Gender Commission
- International Relations Commission
- Mediation Commission
- Politics and Elections Commission
- Public Management Commission
- Young Professionals Commission

== Professional Training ==
Since 2002, COLPIS offers a range of courses designed to meet the professional needs of political scientists and sociologists in the labour market, as well as to provide training resources relevant to other disciplines. Most of its training activities focus on presenting and applying tools and instruments that support and improve the work carried out by these professionals in their various fields of activity.

== Publications ==
From 1996 to 2012, COLPIS published the quarterly journal Àmbits de Política i Societat, which examined contemporary political and social issues as well as classic themes in Catalan political and social thought. A total of 48 issues were produced, all of which are now available in open-access digital format.

Since 2012, Àmbits has adopted a hybrid model: articles are published continuously on a blog, while monographic issues continue to appear in both printed and digital versions.

Together with the Associació Catalana de Sociologia (Catalan Sociological Association), COLPIS also co-edited the volume Notes for a History of Catalan Political Science and Sociology, coordinated by Josep Maria Reniu i Vilamala, Marta Soler Gallart, and Eulàlia Solé Romero.

In November 2021, COLPIS launched a podcast series titled La mirada del Colpis, which forms part of its portfolio of publications.

== Miquel Caminal and Anna Alabart Awards ==
Since 2018, COLPIS has awarded the annual Miquel Caminal and Anna Alabart Awards for the best undergraduate dissertations in Political Science, Public Management and Administration, Sociology, International Relations, Security Studies, and Philosophy, Politics and Economics. The prizes seek to recognise emerging academic talent.

Eligible candidates include fourth-year students in these disciplines at Catalan public and private universities, as well as UNED-affiliated centres in Catalonia. Catalan students pursuing these degrees abroad may also participate.

The awards honour two prominent figures in Catalan Political Science and Sociology: political scientist Miquel Caminal i Badia and sociologist Anna Alabart i Vilà.
