= Bages Tram-train =

Proposed railway in Bages, Spain

The Bages Tram-train is a railway project for the Catalan comarca of Bages. A feasibility study was conducted and ready by 2016, two years after construction began in 2014. The cost of the project, excluding the rolling stock, was €105 million.

== Features ==
This line will be 34.4 km long, 25 km of which are Ferrocarrils de la Generalitat de Catalunya freight lines. With 25 stations, it will link the towns of Manresa, Sallent and Súria, as well as allow connection with other transportation services such as Rodalies Barcelona in Manresa.

== See also ==
- Autoritat Territorial de la Mobilitat de les Comarques Centrals
