= Autoritat del Transport Metropolità =

Transport consortium in Barcelona, Spain

Metropolitan Transport Authority
- Autoritat del Transport Metropolità

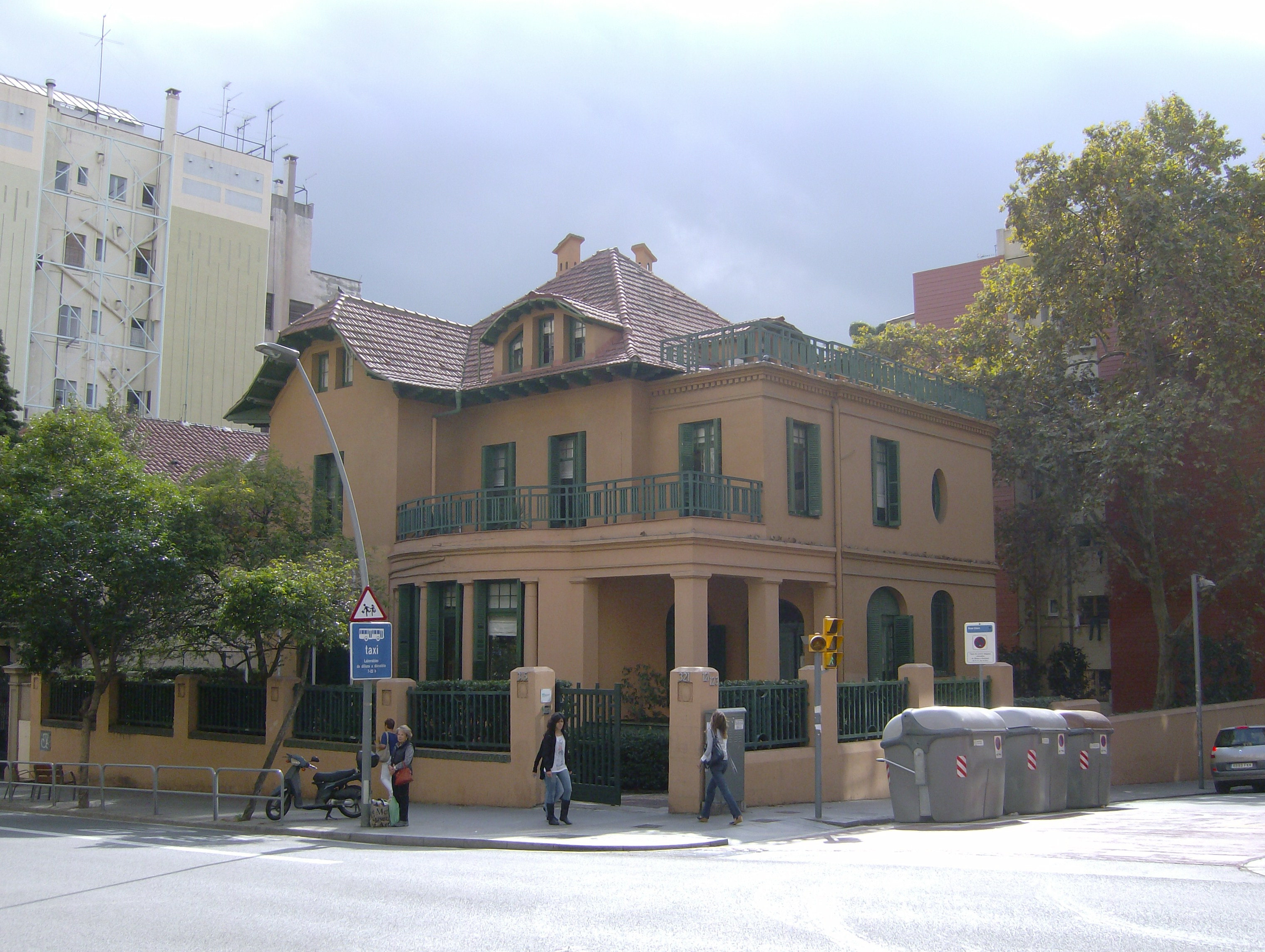
- The house hosting the ATM headquarters in the Barcelona district of Sarrià-Sant Gervasi
- Abbreviation: ATM
- Formation: 19 March 1997; 29 years ago
- Type: Governmental organization
- Registration no.: P-5890049-I
- Legal status: Public partnership
- Purpose: Coordinating operations and projecting expansion of the public transport system in the Barcelona metropolitan area.
- Headquarters: 315–321 Carrer Muntaner; 08021 Barcelona
- Region served: Alt Penedès, Anoia, Bages, Baix Penedès (partially), Barcelonès, Baix Llobregat, Berguedà, Garraf, Maresme, Moianès, Osona, Ripollès, Selva (partially), Vallès Occidental and Vallès Oriental comarques.
- Owners: Government of Catalonia (51%); Local administrations (49%)—includes the Barcelona City Council, Àrea Metropolitana de Barcelona (AMB) and Associació de Municipis per la Mobilitat i el Transport Urbà (AMTU)
- Chairman: Pere Torres
- Budget: €1,158,356,633.63 (2016)
- Website: atm.cat

The Metropolitan Transport Authority (Catalan: Autoritat del Transport Metropolità, ATM) is a public consortium intended to coordinate the operation and project the expansion of the public transport system in the Barcelona metropolitan area. It is made up of the Government of Catalonia and local administrations. It has been known as ATM Àrea de Barcelona since 2003 to differentiate it from the other existing Catalan public transport authorities in the Girona, Camp de Tarragona and Lleida areas, which are also identified as ATM. As of January 2015, the ATM-managed public transport system comprises 50 different operating companies and serves 346 municipalities, accounting for a population of over 5.7 million.

Created in 1997, the ATM has since developed an Integrated Fare System (Catalan: Sistema Tarifari Integrat, STI) based on concentric fare zones. There currently exist about 80 different types of multiple-time tickets or unlimited passes for use on the STI, all of which allow free-of-charge interchange between transport modes in a single trip. In 2012, it was announced that the ATM was planning to upgrade the current magnetic stripe-based technology used on the STI to a contactless smart card validation system known as T-mobilitat, reducing all the existing ATM cards to one.

== Integrated Fare System ==
The Integrated Fare System (Catalan: Sistema Tarifari Integrat, STI) is the fare zone-based ticketing system run by the ATM allowing unified public transport fare integration throughout the Barcelona metropolitan area and beyond. The STI consists of six (now 7) concentric fare zones centered in Barcelona, numbered 1–6, which are further divided into sectors lettered A–H. The overall system virtually reaches the entire province of Barcelona, as well as adjacent parts of the Girona and Tarragona provinces, serving a total number of 15 comarques (counties) and 346 municipalities, that is a population of over 5.7 million.

A schematic map of the STI fare zone system in 2009. The current system has an additional fare zone 6H, comprising the northern part of the Osona comarca.

An anonymous T-mobilitat contactless reloadable ticket. (1€)

Almost all public transport services within the STI are fare-integrated, with the exceptions of tourist-oriented services such as the Aerobús express bus to Barcelona–El Prat Airport, the Tramvia Blau or the Montserrat Rack Railway and its associated funiculars. All major railway systems in the Barcelona area are fare-integrated, including the Barcelona Metro, the Trambaix and Trambesòs light rail–tram systems, the Rodalies de Catalunya-operated Barcelona commuter rail service, as well as the entire Barcelona–Vallès and Llobegat–Anoia lines. The metro and the light rail–tram systems are entirely within fare zone 1. Nevertheless, there are the following exceptions:

- Barcelona Metro: the T-casual, T-familiar & T-grup (see below) is not accepted at the stations serving Barcelona–El Prat Airport—Airport T1 and Airport T2 stations on Barcelona Metro line 9 (L9 Sud). Nevertheless, the rest of fare-integrated cards are valid.
- Rodalies de Catalunya: its Barcelona commuter rail service also uses its own fare zone system for use with its non-integrated tickets. Although its fare zones are almost identical to those of the STI, they differ at some locations such as at Barcelona–El Prat Airport, thus creating differences on the prices for the same trip.

There are seven basic types of fare-integrated cards—the T-casual, T-familiar, T-grup, T-usual, T-Jove, T-Dia and T-16—, all of which are multiple-time tickets or unlimited passes allowing free-of-charge interchange between transport modes in 1 hour and 25 minutes within one fare zone (plus 15 minutes for each additional zone). Single tickets (Bitllet senzill) are not fare-integrated and thus they do not allow interchange between transport modes or operating companies. However from May 2025 they can be issued on T-mobilitat contactless cards.

All fare-integrated cards are identified with letter T followed by a hyphen ("T-") before a distinct name. There currently exist about 80 types of fare-integrated cards, depending on the number of fare zones permitted to cross, their validity period as well as the existence of fare reductions. Non-personalised fare-integrated cards can be purchased at railway and bus stations, at tram stops, at customer service points of the integrated companies, at CaixaBank cash machines, as well as at newsagent's shops and a number of small shops.

The seven basic fare-integrated cards have the following features:

| Card | No. of trips | Validity time | Personalised (Note: Personalised cards require carrying along an identity document.) | Notes |
|---|---|---|---|---|
| T-casual | 10 | Until fares update | No | Up to 3 free-of-charge interchanges per trip permitted. Multiple users NOT allowed. Not for use at Airport T1 and Airport T2 stations on Barcelona Metro line 9 (L9 Sud). |
| T-familiar | 8 | 30 days | No | Up to 3 free-of-charge interchanges per trip permitted. Only one-zone cards available. Multiple users allowed. Not for use at Airport T1 and Airport T2 stations on Barcelona Metro line 9 (L9 Sud). |
| T-grup | 70 | 30 days | No | Up to 3 free-of-charge interchanges per trip permitted. Multiple users allowed. Not for use at Airport T1 and Airport T2 stations on Barcelona Metro line 9 (L9 Sud). |
| T-usual | Unlimited | 30 days | Yes | Id or Passport number needs to be entered when purchasing Cardboard T-mobilitat card. |
| T-Jove | Unlimited | 90 days | Yes | Only valid for people aged 30 or younger. |
| T-Dia | Unlimited | 1 day | No | Only one round trip to Airport T1 and Airport T2 stations on Barcelona Metro line 9 (L9 Sud) permitted. |
| T-16 | Unlimited | Depends on age of card holder (4–16 years old) | Yes | Initial €4.50 payment, then free of charge. Only one-zone (fare zone of residence) cards available. Known as T-12 prior to 31 December 2016, when it was valid for children aged 4–12. |

The fares for each type of card are calculated according to the number of fare zones crossed. Regarding unlimited passes, the first fare zone in which the pass is validated will determine the number of fare zones permitted to cross with that pass. Since fares are updated on 1 January of each year, the multiple-time tickets purchased the previous year expire on 28–29 February (depending on the year), whilst unlimited passes expire on 31 March.

The (obsolete) 2017 fares (excluding reduced fares for large and single-parent families, as well as unemployed people) are as follows:

Basic 2017 fares
| | No. of fare zones crossed (Note: Note that each sector in which each concentric fare zone is divided is counted as a different fare zone. No more than 6 zones can be charged in a single trip.) | | | | | |
| Card | 1 | 2 | 3 | 4 | 5 | 6 |
|---|---|---|---|---|---|---|
| T-10 | €9.95 | €19.60 | €26.75 | €34.45 | €39.55 | €42.05 |
| T-50/30 | €42.50 | — | — | — | — | — |
| T-70/30 | €59.50 | €86.05 | €118.00 | €144.50 | €165.50 | €179.50 |
| T-Mes | €52.75 | €71.00 | €99.60 | €122.00 | €140.00 | €150.00 |
| T-Trimestre | €142.00 | €192.00 | €269.00 | €329.50 | €378.00 | €405.00 |
| T-Jove | €105.00 | €142.00 | €199.20 | €244.00 | €280.00 | €300.00 |
| T-Dia | €8.40 | €12.80 | €16.05 | €17.95 | €20.10 | €22.50 |
