= ATMS =

ATMS may refer to

- Advanced Traffic Management System for highways.
- Advanced Train Management System for railways.
- IBM Administrative Terminal System#ATMS, IBM's successor to ATS/360.
- Advanced Technology Microwave Sounder, a satellite microwave radiometer.

== See also ==
- ATM (disambiguation), for the singular of ATMs
- AMS (disambiguation), also for @MS (at-MS)
