= Polígon industrial del Segre railway station =

Polígon industrial del Segre

General information
- Location: Spain
- Coordinates: 41°37′22″N 0°39′10″E
- System: Lleida–La Pobla Line
- Owner: FGC
- Line: RL1, RL2
- Tracks: 1

Construction
- Structure type: Above ground

History
- Opened: 2024
Location
- Location within Catalonia Location within Spain

Polígon industrial del Segre is a Spanish railway station on the Lleida–La Pobla Line, operated by Ferrocarrils de la Generalitat de Catalunya, in the east of the city of Lleida. Opened on 18 March 2024, the station provides service to the industrial estate with the same name as well as a municipal park.

The station is the first new station to open on the line since its transfer to FGC in 2016.
