= Lleida–La Pobla Line =

Railway line in Catalonia

Coordinates: 42°10′22″N 0°53′36″E

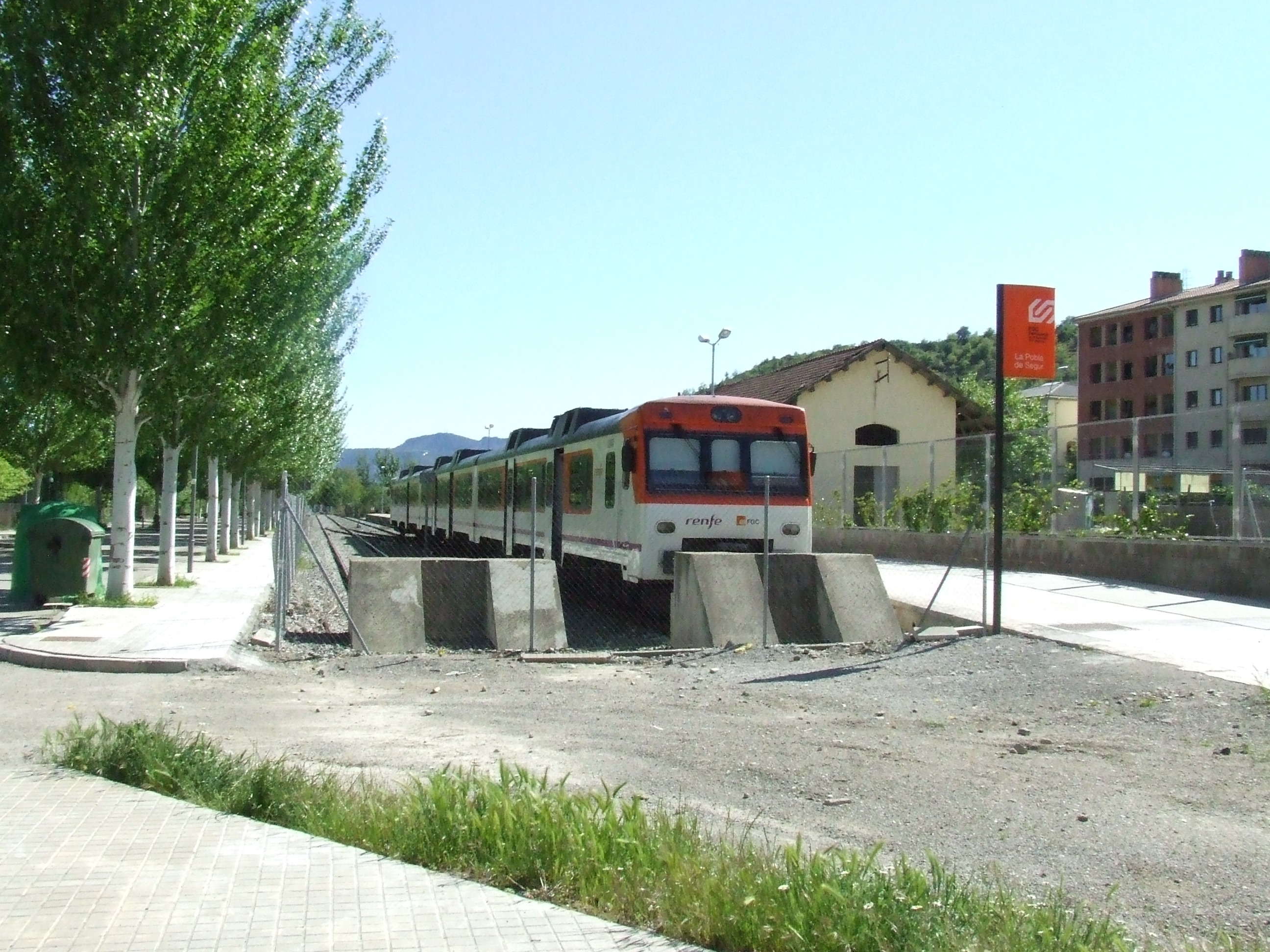
- A Renfe Class 592 train at La Pobla de Segur station in 2009.

Overview
- Native name: Línia Lleida-La Pobla
- Status: Operational
- Locale: Segrià, Noguera and Pallars Jussà comarques
- Termini: Lleida Pirineus; La Pobla de Segur
- Stations: 17
- Website: lleidalapobla.fgc.cat

Service
- Type: Commuter rail, regional rail
- Services: Lleida Pirineus–Balaguer; Lleida Pirineus–La Pobla de Segur
- Operator: Ferrocarrils de la Generalitat de Catalunya (FGC)
- Depot: Pla de Vilanoveta (temporarily)
- Rolling stock: Regular service: 2 Stadler GTW 2/6 (FGC 331 Series) DMUs; Tren dels Llacs: 5 Renfe Class 6000 passenger cars hauled by two 308 Series diesel locomotives
- Ridership: Regular service: 251,843 passenger journeys (2019); Tren dels Llacs: 6,703 passenger journeys (2019)

History
- Opened: 3 February 1924: Adif (access line to Lleida Pirineus station); Government of Catalonia (rest of the line)

Technical
- Line length: 89.35 km (55.52 mi)
- Num of tracks: 1
- Character: At-grade
- Track gauge: 1,668 mm (5 ft 5 21/32 in) Iberian gauge
- Minimum radius: 300 metres (980 ft)
Route map

The Lleida–La Pobla Line (Catalan: Línia Lleida-La Pobla) is a 89.4-kilometre-long (55.6 mi) railway line linking Lleida and La Pobla de Segur, in Catalonia, Spain. Most of its users concentrate between Lleida and Balaguer, where a frequent service is offered, with few trains continuing to La Pobla de Segur. Since 2009, a heritage railway service branded Tren dels Llacs (English: "Lakes Train"), in reference to the number of reservoirs skirted by the line north of Balaguer, has been running on the railway. The line is part of the ATM Àrea de Lleida fare-integrated public transport system between Lleida and Àger.

On 3 February 1924, the line's first stretch opened between Lleida and Balaguer, initially as part of a planned international rail line through the Pyrenees mountains between Lleida and Saint-Girons in France. Between 1949 and 1951, it was extended to the current northern terminus in La Pobla de Segur. The line was targeted for closure by the Spanish government in the 1980s, with great opposition from regional and local administrations. This led to the eventual transfer of the line to the Catalan government in 2004, although the national rail operator Renfe continued to provide the service. In 2016, the line's operation was fully taken over by the regional company Ferrocarrils de la Generalitat de Catalunya (FGC) following the introduction of new rolling stock and service improvements. Polígon industrial del Segre station, serving an industrial estate in the east of Lleida, opened on 18 March 2024.

== Bibliography ==
- Memòria de Ferrocarrils de la Generalitat de Catalunya 2014 [2014 Report of Ferrocarrils de la Generalitat de Catalunya] (PDF) (Report) (in Catalan). Ferrocarrils de la Generalitat de Catalunya; Department of Public Works and Transport. Government of Catalonia. 1 July 2015.
- Garola Crespo, Àlvar (July 2005). Anàlisi de la viabilitat econòmica i social d'un servei de rodalies: Aplicació al cas del tren de la Pobla [Study on the economic and social viability of the implementation of a commuter rail service: Application to the case of the La Pobla railway] (Thesis) (in Catalan). Polytechnic University of Catalonia. hdl:2099.1/3263.
- Prieto Tur, Lluís; Enguix Peiró, Joan Carles (2008). Línia Lleida - La Pobla. El Ferrocarril Transpirinenc de la Noguera Pallaresa [Lleida–La Pobla Line. The Noguera Pallaresa's Trans-Pyrenees Railway.] (in Catalan) (1st ed.). Department of Public Works and Transport. Government of Catalonia. ISBN 978-84-935172-4-3.
