= Dipsalut =

Spanish organization

Dipsalut, Independent Public Health Body of Girona Provincial Council.
- Dipsalut, Organisme de Salut Pública de la Diputació de Girona
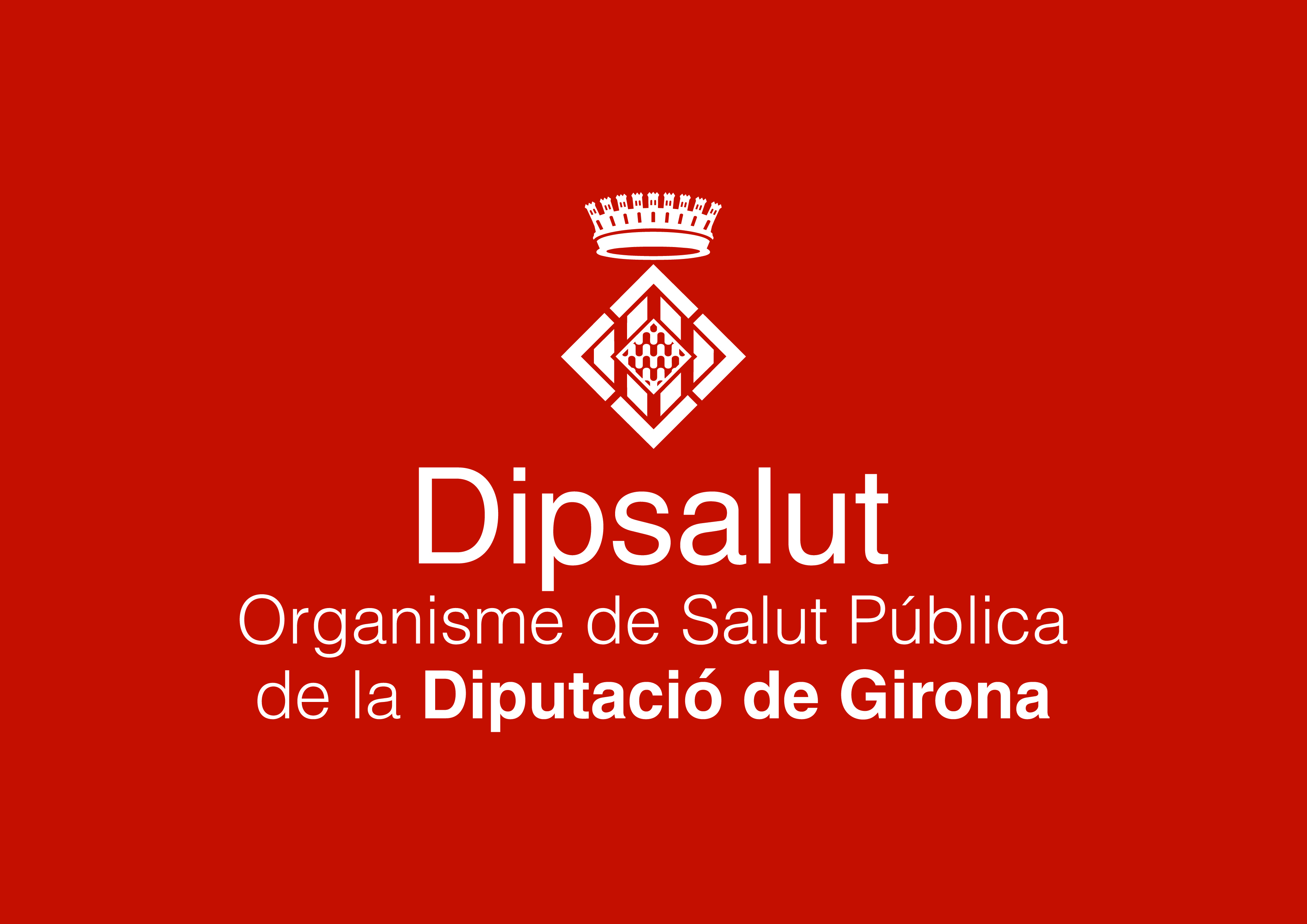
- Abbreviation: Dipsalut
- Formation: May 31, 2007; 19 years ago
- Founder: Decree by Girona Provincial Council
- Type: Governmental organization
- Location(s): Scientific and Technological Park at the University of Girona (Girona, Catalonia, Spain)
- Region served: Province of Girona
- Members: 221 municipalities
- Official language: Catalan
- Parent organization: Council of Girona
- Website: www.dipsalut.cat

Dipsalut is the Independent Public Health Body of Girona Provincial Council and a local public administration. This organisation was officially launched on 31 May 2007. Its headquarters are located in Girona, with offices in the Scientific and Technological Park at the University of Girona.

In Spain and Catalonia the law requires local authorities to take responsibility for health matters in their territories, providing healthy public spaces and facilities and ensuring a healthy environment for their citizens. Dipsalut is in charge of covering these municipal obligations, providing services and technical and financial support for the 221 local councils in the province of Girona.

== Functions ==
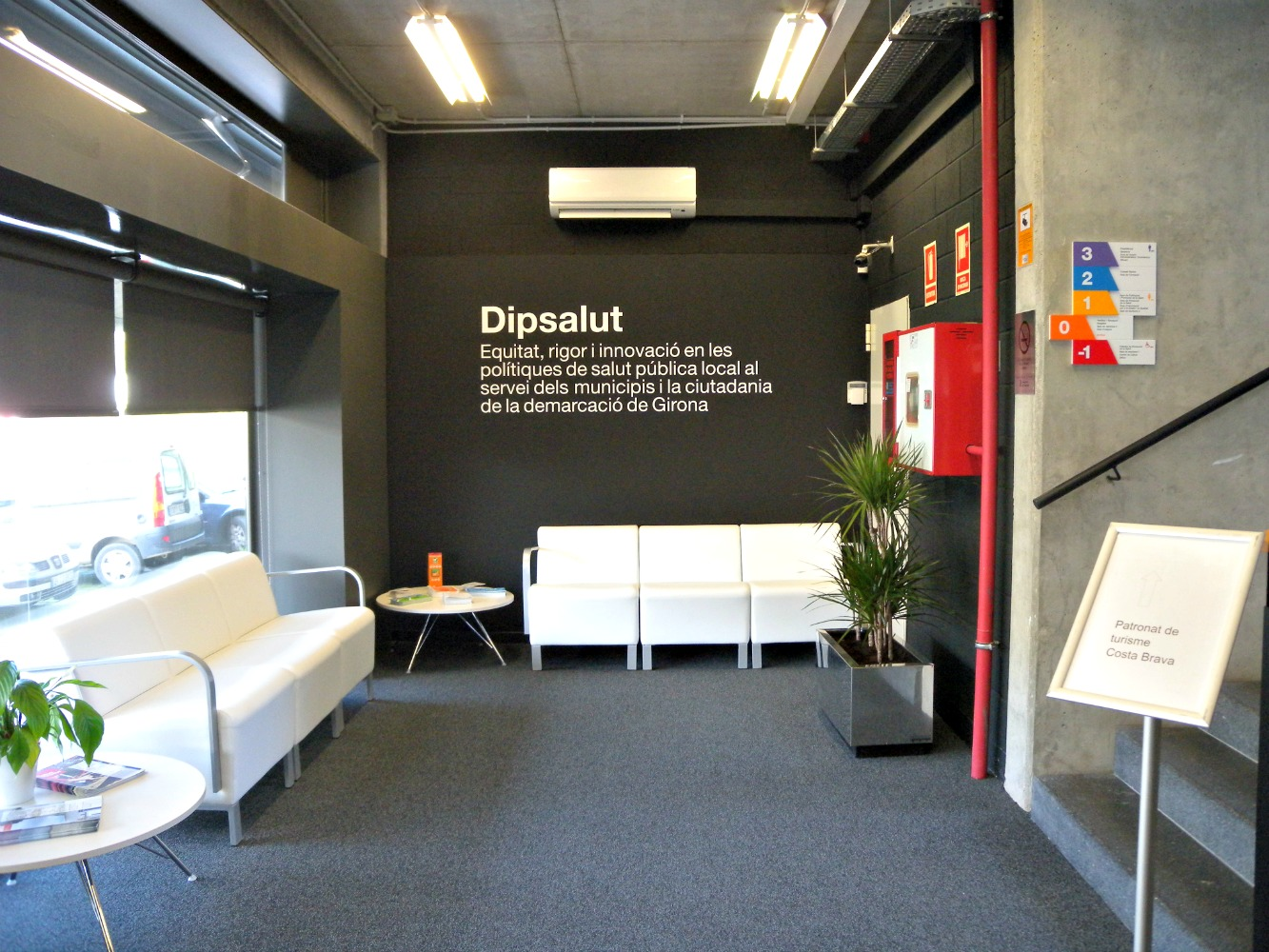
Waiting area of the Dipsalut

Dipsalut provides support for local councils in the province of Girona to help them carry out actions to meet their public health responsibilities. According to Section 11 of Act 16/2003 and Article 5 of Dipsalut's Articles of Association, these responsibilities are:

- Provide epidemiological information and monitoring.
- Protect and promote public health.
- Prevent disease.
- Promote and protect environmental health.
- Promote and protect occupational health.
- Promote food safety.
- Manage health risks in buildings, homes and inhabited spaces, particularly food centres, hairdressers, saunas and personal hygiene centres, hotels and tourist centres, and sports and leisure facilities and areas.
- Manage health risks in cemeteries and mortuary health police.
- Manage health risks in municipal facilities: swimming pools, civic centres, theatres, etc.
- Manage health risks related with pets.
- Manage health risks related with urban pests and urban wild animals.
- Run educational campaigns to promote health.

== Organisation ==
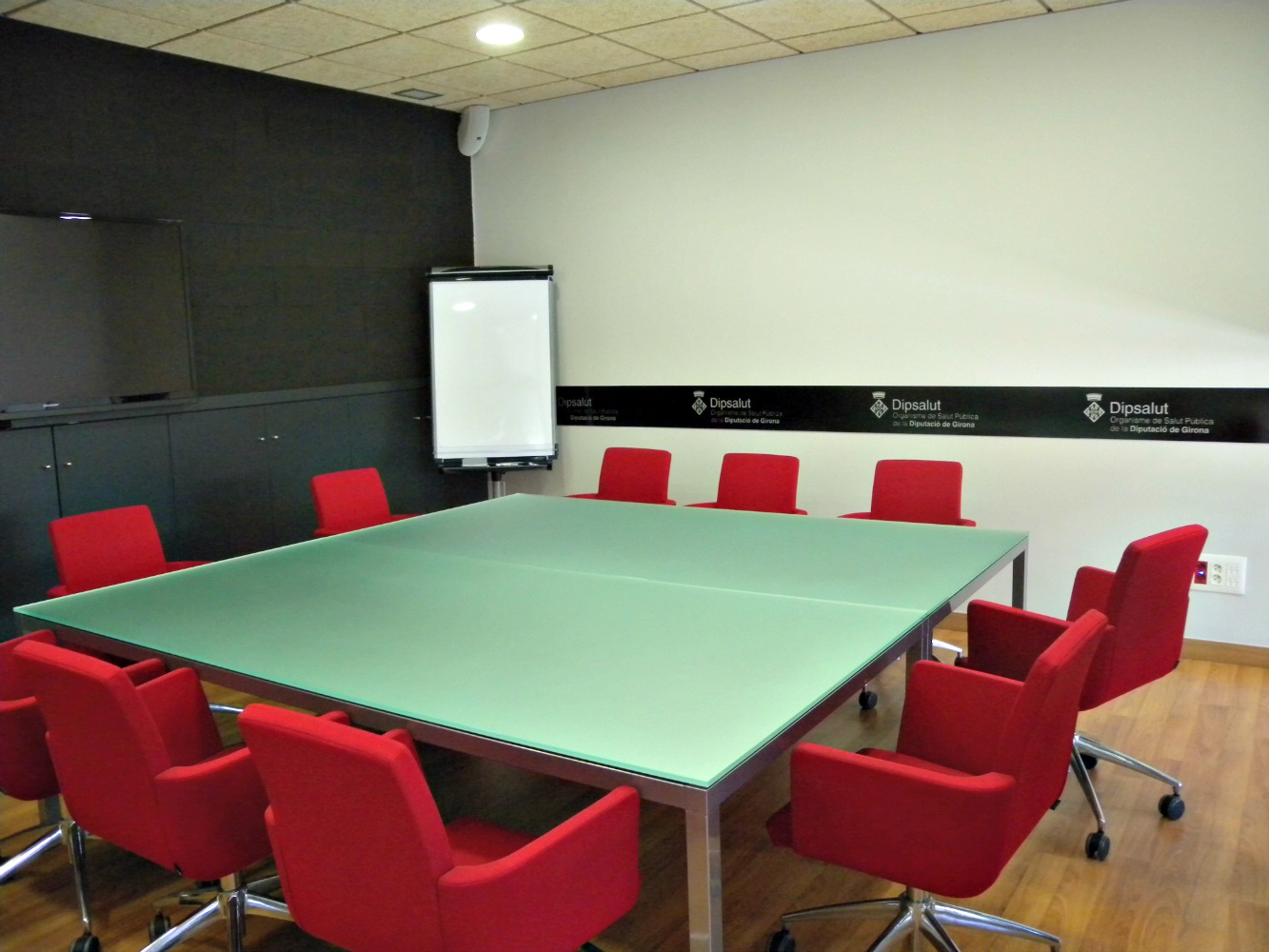
Governing Council Chamber

Dipsalut is managed by a Governing Council, which is responsible for establishing the organisation's strategic objectives and ensuring that these are achieved. The Council is made up of a chairman and between eight and twelve members.

The presidency of Dipsalut always rests with the chairman of Girona Provincial Council. The members of the Governing Council are appointed at the Plenary Session of the Provincial Council and are mayors and councillors from the province of Girona, with the requirement that at least half of them must be councillors on Girona Provincial Council. The chairman may appoint a vice-chairman from among the members of the Governing Council to carry out tasks delegated by the chairman or the Governing Council.

The financial and administrative management of Dipsalut is carried out by a manager appointed by the chairman. This person must be a graduate and may be a civil servant or a person with a minimum of five years’ professional experience. The manager is in charge of managing and achieving the objectives set by the Governing Council, executing the assigned budget, drafting the Governing Council's budget proposal and managing the organisation's staff, among other functions. The staff is made up of civil servants and other employees.

== Programmes ==
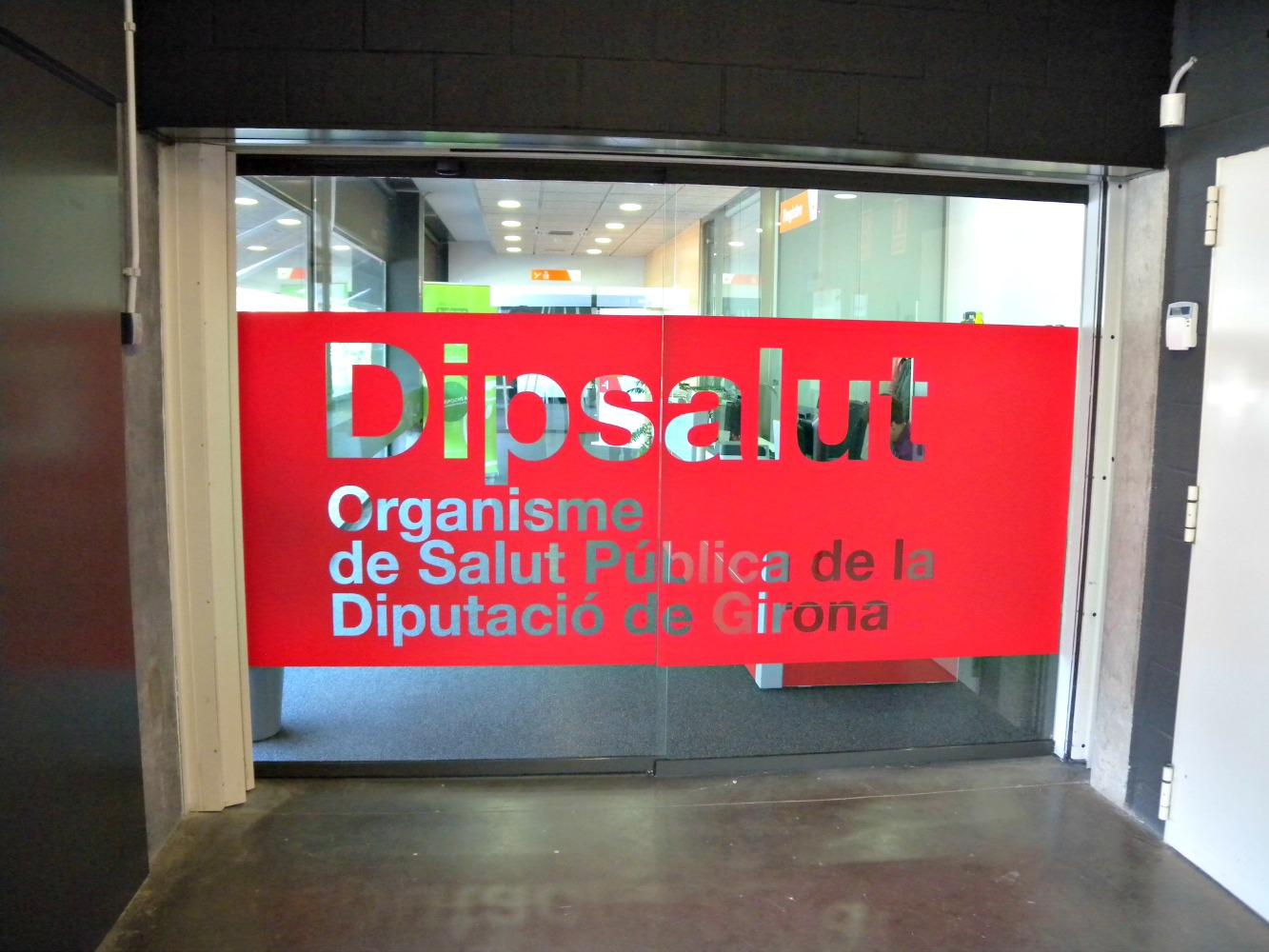
Entrance of the new headquarters of Dipsalut in the University of Girona

=== Health protection area ===
Dipsalut considers health protection as a series of actions involving management, monitoring and control aimed at preserving public health against physical, chemical, biological, food and environmental agents present in the surroundings and inhabited places. These actions are detailed in Dipsalut's catalogue of services and are designed to reduce the risks present in the region and to control and protect the environment in which people live. Supporting local councils so that they can exercise their municipal powers over health protection involves five lines of action:

- Environmental health: there are two support programmes for managing and controlling health in high-risk facilities (Pt01) and low-risk facilities (Pt02) where Legionella may be present.
- Water for human consumption: with a programme to support direct municipal management of drinking water supplies (Pt03) and a quality assessment and control programme for tap water in consumers’ homes (Pt04)
- Public facilities and inhabited places: there are eight programmes in this area: health and hygiene assessment of public swimming pools (Pt05), support for managing health risks in public swimming pools owned or managed by local councils (Pt06) and on beaches (Pt07), financial support for managing safety, monitoring and lifeguards on public beaches (Pt08), support for managing health risks in children's sandpits (Pt09), financial support for urban pest control and prevention (Pt10), support for managing health risks posed by the presence of tiger mosquitoes (Pt11) and managing and controlling health risks posed by the presence of black flies in the counties of Gironès and Baix Empordà (Pt12).
- Food safety: a programme to raise awareness of food safety in municipalities (Pt13).
- Technical advice and support: a technical advice and support programme for local health protection policies (Pt14).

=== Health promotion and policy area ===
The health promotion and policy area generates mechanisms that have a bearing on healthy environments, people's lifestyles, health promotion policies, social participation and refocusing services. This area considers health to be a basic human right, and takes a positive view which believes and trusts in peoples’ and society's capacity to use resources to generate health, thus allowing them to progress towards an optimum level of wellbeing.

To achieve this, Dipsalut's programmes and actions focus on providing people with tools in the form of knowledge, abilities and attitudes to help them understand, manage and give meaning to their lives, thereby strengthening their life-skills and building individuals’ and communities’ capacities to take greater control over their own health. This concept is based on the premise that people's health depends on the living conditions in which they are born, live and die and that these are influenced by economic, social, cultural, environmental and personal factors.

Supporting local councils so that they can exercise their municipal powers over health promotion involves four lines of action:

- Living conditions: with the ‘Urban health parks and healthy itineraries’ programme (Pm01), psychological support and attention in emergency situations in the municipality (Pm04), the ‘Girona, cardio-protected territory’ programme, and defibrillator training for young people (Pm09).
- Lifestyles: with the oral health programme (Pm03) and the ‘Be yourself’ programme's health tools and resources (Pm08).
- Reduction of inequality: with the ‘Health and crisis’ programme (Pm10).
- Support and advice on health resources: with three programmes: municipal technical advisory service on young people's health (Pm02), technical advice and support for municipal health promotion policies (Pm06) and financial support for carrying out health promotion activities (Pm07).

In addition to the programmes detailed in the catalogue of services, the organisation also offers two annual training programmes containing a range of free courses designed to help municipal employees and other public healthcare professionals update their knowledge and improve their skills.

To guarantee the correct implementation of these programmes and to help the municipalities with anything relating to public health, Dipsalut set up a Local Public Health Agents’ Network. The professionals in this network maintain permanent contact with their assigned towns and cities, offering advice and information and supervising all the services that Dipsalut provides in the territory.

== ‘Girona, cardio-protected territory’ programme ==
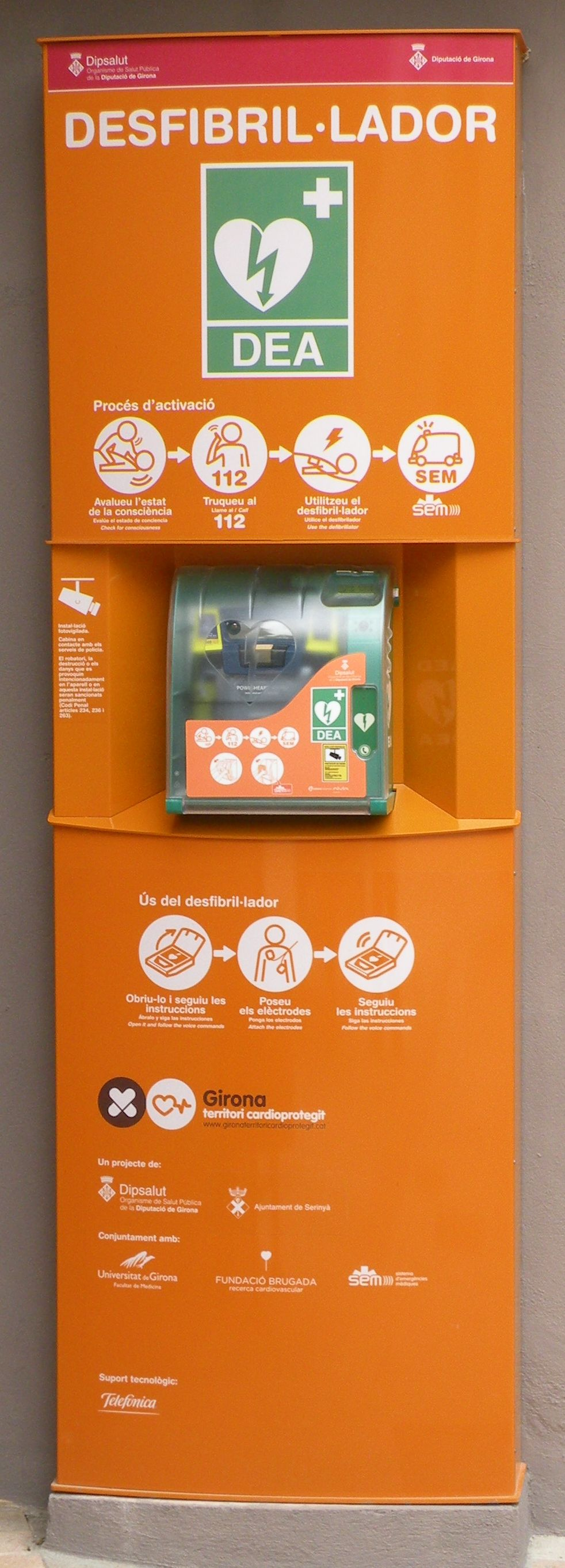
Automated external defibrillator (AED) Dipsalut implemented in the province of Girona.

Each year in Catalonia between 3,000 and 4,000 people die from sudden cardiac death,[note 1] which is when a person's heart stops pumping blood due to a problem with their cardiac rhythm. It can affect people of all ages and both sexes and it is unpredictable. The only way to save the victim's life is to use a defibrillator, a device that delivers an electric shock to help the heart recover its normal rhythm. To save the victim and avoid any subsequent after-effects it is essential to use the defibrillator within the first few minutes of the cardiac arrest.

However, in the past defibrillators were usually only available in very specific places and could only be used by trained people. In order to make these devices available to everyone and facilitate rapid intervention in cases of cardiac arrests in out-of-hospital settings, Dipsalut introduced the ‘Girona, cardio-protected territory’ programme. This programme consists of deploying a network of up to 650 automated external defibrillators (AED) for public use in the province of Girona. There are fixed devices –located inside columns– that are installed in squares, streets and on the facades of buildings, and there are portable devices which have been issued to the police and emergency medical services to be carried in their vehicles. In addition, defibrillators are also loaned out for cultural, sporting and other public events. Dipsalut carries out numerous informative actions, such as courses, talks and workshops to raise awareness of the programme and teach people how to use the defibrillators. The aim of ‘Girona, cardio-protected territory’ is to facilitate a rapid response to sudden cardiac arrests in out-of-hospital settings. This initiative aims to reduce mortality in these cases by between 25 and 30%.

Dipsalut provides the municipalities with automated external defibrillators, which are safe and very easy to use. As soon as the user opens the lid of the defibrillator a recorded message is activated. The message provides clear instructions for placing the electrodes on the patient so that the device can analyse the patient's vital signs. If a shock is required, the defibrillator automatically delivers this, without the user needing to take any further action, not even pressing a button. There is no risk of causing the victim any injury by using the defibrillator, as the device will only deliver a shock if it is necessary.

In addition, the column housing the fixed defibrillators is connected to the emergency medical services (SEM), who receive an alert as soon as someone removes the defibrillator. Thanks to a positioning system, the emergency medical services know exactly which defibrillator has been activated and can send an ambulance directly to the site of the event.

It is also possible to speak to the emergency medical services through the defibrillator column. However, in all its educational and publicity programmes, Dipsalut always reminds users that the best thing to do in case of an emergency is to call an ambulance immediately by dialling 112.

The organisation, both in its publicity actions and on informative stickers on the defibrillator column, provides instructions to follow in the case of sudden cardiac arrest: Firstly, check to see if the person who has collapsed is conscious or not. If the victim is unconscious, call 112 immediately. Meanwhile, find the nearest defibrillator, remove it from its box, take it to the victim and open the lid. Then, simply follow the instructions provided by the device and, finally, wait for the police or ambulance to arrive. Time is of the essence, as the chances of surviving sudden cardiac arrest decrease dramatically after the first five minutes. It is therefore recommended that, in these situations, the people present at the emergency share the tasks between them. One person can assess the victim, while another calls an ambulance and a third person runs to find a defibrillator. Dividing the tasks up in this way can save a great deal of time and increase the chances of saving the victim and avoid any future after-effects caused by the cardiac arrest. This initiative is expected to reduce mortality due to sudden cardiac death in the Girona province by between 20 and 25%.

To publicise the programme and raise public awareness of the need to act rapidly in possible cases of sudden cardiac death, Dipsalut carries out different communication actions, such as demonstrations of how to use a defibrillator. It also runs a training programme for professionals likely to need to use the defibrillators, such as local police and concierges, and anyone else who is interested. Among the educational material published, there is a video tutorial showing the steps to follow in cases of cardiac arrest and explaining how to use the defibrillators deployed by Dipsalut.

=== Objectives ===
The aims of the ‘Girona, cardio-protected territory’ programme are:

- Implement a network of defibrillators across the territory so that all of the municipalities in the Girona province have access to these devices.
- Ensure that in cases of cardiac arrest the network of defibrillators helps minimise response times and reduce the number of sudden cardiac deaths.
- Facilitate the rapid intervention of the emergency medical services.
- Raise awareness and teach the general public, especially municipal professionals, about the benefits and use of the defibrillators.
- Raise the general public's awareness of the benefits of a healthy diet, regular physical activity and the importance of maintaining a healthy lifestyle in order to reduce the risk of suffering cardiovascular diseases.
- Evaluate, through the Girona, vital study, whether a programme of public access to defibrillators improves victims’ survival rates and reduces the subsequent after-effects in cases of out-of-hospital cardiac arrest.

=== Details of the programme ===
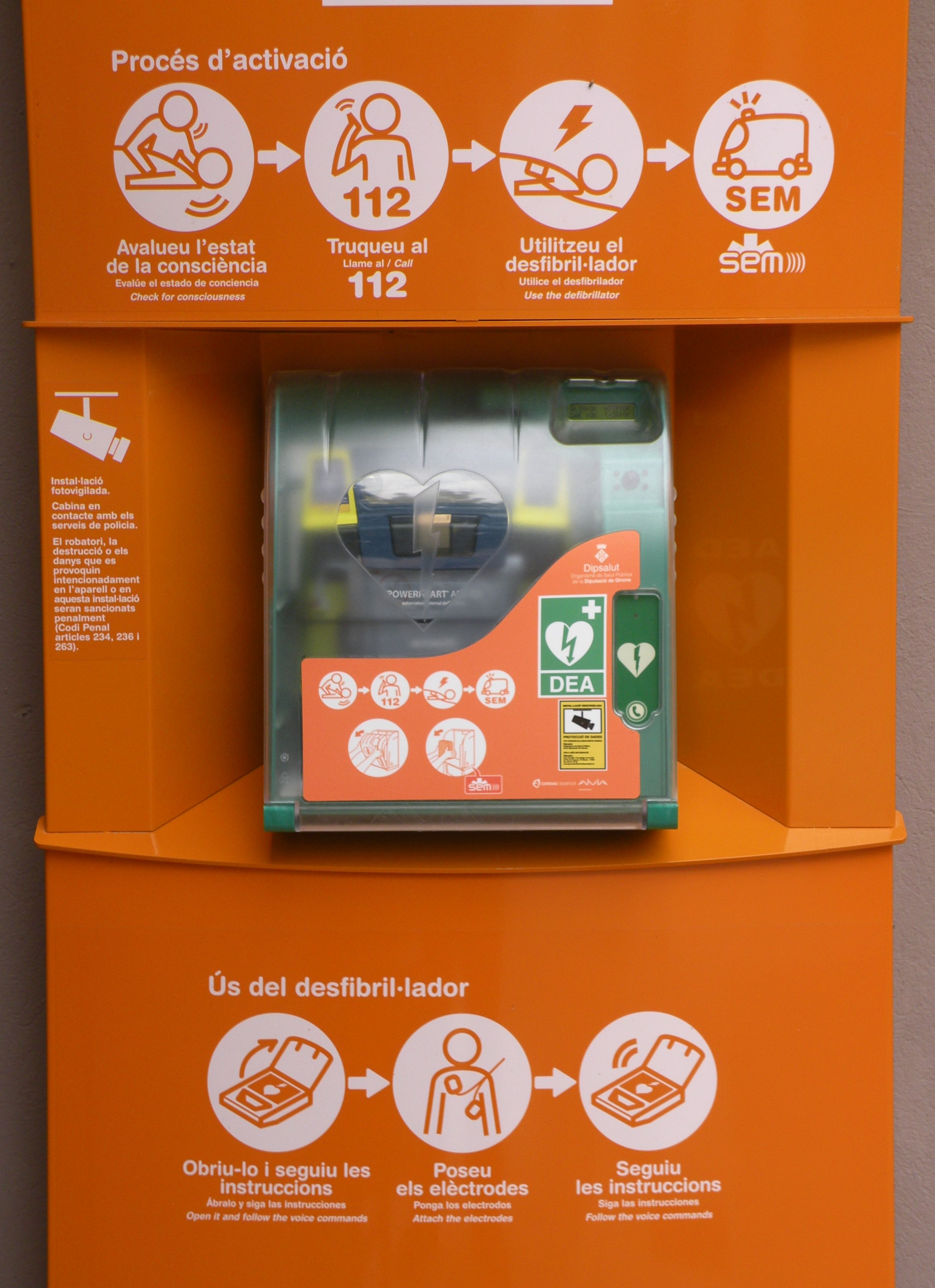
Details front automatic external defibrillator (AED)

‘Girona, cardio-protected territory’ has already led to the deployment of a network of more than 747 automated defibrillators (AED) for public use throughout the province of Girona. All of the province's municipalities have at least one device. The remaining AEDs have been distributed according to objective criteria such as number of inhabitants, facilities/population groups at risk and number of ambulances in the area.

So far, Dipsalut has provided 503 fixed, 170 portable and 47 loan defibrillators.

In addition to providing and installing these defibrillators completely free of charge, Dipsalut takes full responsibility for managing the devices. This includes providing information, controlling, monitoring and maintaining the network of defibrillators. The maintenance includes annual inspections, interior and exterior cleaning of the storage case, responding to incidents, replacing used or broken defibrillators and changing the batteries and electrodes when necessary, always within a maximum period of 24 hours.

At the same time, Dipsalut provides training on how to use these devices correctly and carries out publicity actions around the province to inform people about ‘Girona, cardio-protected territory’, the specific location of the defibrillators and how to use them in the event of an emergency.

The results of ‘Girona, cardio-protected territory’ are being collated and evaluated in order to draw conclusions about its effectiveness and improve the programme. This evaluation will continue for 10 years within the framework of the Girona, vital study, being conducted by the Faculty of Medicine of the University of Girona.

In Catalonia, Decree 151/2012 of 20 November paved the way for public access to defibrillators in the case of devices located in the street and, regardless of the location, in cases of necessity in the absence of a medically trained person.

== ‘Urban health parks and healthy itineraries’ programme ==
The World Health Organization (WHO) has warned that obesity and being overweight are one of today's main health concerns, and are one of ten factors that contribute towards the development of chronic diseases that reduce life expectancy and quality of life. To combat this problem, the WHO recommends taking 30 to 60 minutes of moderate physical exercise per day.

The urban health parks consist of a set of equipment located close together and designed to be used for taking physical exercise that safely works the entire body. The parks were designed by a multidisciplinary committee of experts, and are particularly aimed at adults and the elderly.

The healthy itineraries are well-signposted walking routes that cross urban and outlying areas. The routes are grouped into networks of healthy itineraries, which allows citizens to choose from routes of varying length, depending on their level of physical fitness. The itineraries are designed to be used by the entire population.

Through this programme, Dipsalut aims to provide Girona's citizens with accessible, local and free municipal facilities for taking moderate physical exercise.

To promote the use of these facilities, Dipsalut, in collaboration with local and county councils, offers physical exercise sessions for specialised professionals which, in addition to giving advice on the correct use of the parks and networks, also aim to develop life-skills and increase the level of control that people have over their own health, thereby helping to improve their quality of life.

In coordination with the Generalitat de Catalunya’s PAFES (physical activity and sports promotion) programme, the parks and networks are recommended by the respective basic healthcare areas as places where the public can go to take moderate physical exercise.

=== Objectives ===
- Help the users of the facilities to understand and value the health benefits of physical exercise and, as a result, incorporate more physical activity into their daily lives.
- Create new social spaces for the programme's users and boost their motivation to do more physical activity.
- Help make the publicity actions for the urban health parks and healthy itineraries an enjoyable experience for users that encourages them to use these facilities regularly.
- Incorporate life-skills exercises into the urban health parks.
- Train professionals to deliver exercise sessions in the parks and networks.
- Train primary healthcare professionals to promote physical exercise in the urban health parks and networks of healthy itineraries.

=== Recipients ===
Local councils in the province of Girona.

=== Beneficiaries ===
The general public and professionals in the healthcare, sports, social and leisure sectors.

=== Development of actions ===
The programme is mainly developed through four actions:

- Community mobilisation: responding to the continuous need to encourage different groups to attend the planned sessions and establish coordinated strategies between all the different agents in the municipalities.
- Publicity and raising awareness: a series of activities carried out in the urban health parks and healthy itineraries designed to achieve the project's objectives.
- Continuous training for those promoting the programme and for professionals from the healthcare, sport and leisure sectors who can also raise public awareness of these facilities.
- In parallel, work to raise awareness and offer training in the basic healthcare areas to encourage the professionals working in these areas to include the parks and itineraries in their recommendations for taking moderate physical exercise.

== Communication ==
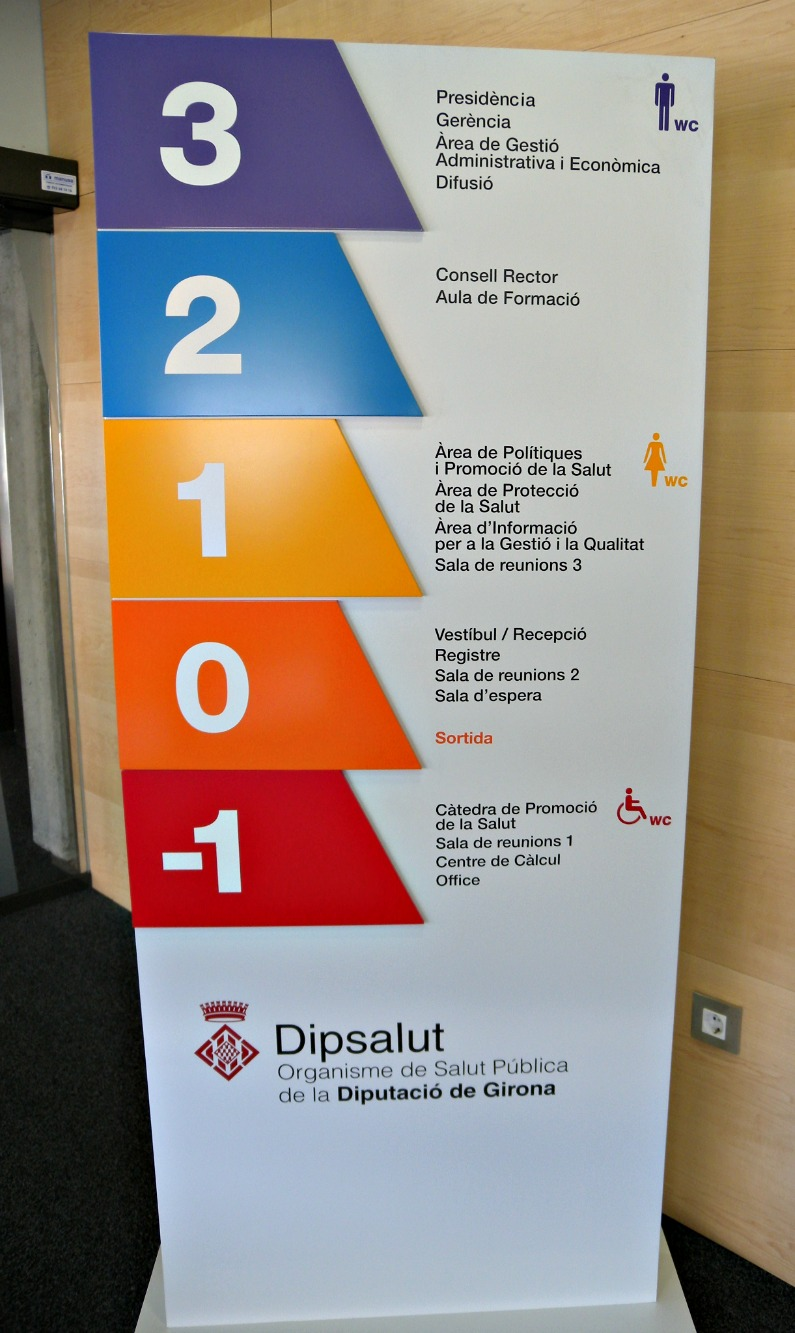
Distribution of the areas of Dipsalut

To aid communication between Dipsalut and local councils and speed up management and operations, the organisation has created a Local Public Health Information System (SIMSAP). This web application allows the different agents involved in public health programmes (local councils, suppliers and Dipsalut) to share data and carry out operations online, through Dipsalut's Virtual Office. The organisation allows users to carry out operations online in order to maximise flexibility, efficacy and efficiency.

== Training ==
In addition to working for and with local councils, Dipsalut dedicates part of its efforts to training the different actors involved in public health services and research in this area.

Twice a year it offers a training programme consisting of a range of free courses, mainly addressed to healthcare professionals and municipal workers. These courses include sessions on controlling noise pollution and managing facilities at risk of transmitting Legionella, training for operators working in drinking water networks, for operational and maintenance crews at public swimming pools, for obtaining a licence to use pesticides and for food handlers, training in psychological first aid and for the urban health parks and networks of healthy itineraries promoters.

== Other actions ==
Dipsalut also carries out other activities, such as providing financial support for local bodies and non-profit organisations to help them carry out health promotion actions. It also promotes and/or collaborates in public health initiatives and leads events to foster cooperation between public administrations and socials agents in the region.

Finally, Dipsalut also supports research by creating, in collaboration with the University of Girona, the Chair of Health Promotion which boosts research and the transfer of knowledge.
