= A. T. M. Fazle Kabir =

Bangladeshi judge

The Honourable A. T. M. Fazle Kabir

Justice of the High Court Division of Bangladesh
- Incumbent
- Assumed office 25 March 2011

Personal details
- Born: 1 January 1947 (age 79)
- Profession: Judge

A. T. M. Fazle Kabir is a judge of the High Court Division of the Bangladesh Supreme Court. He is a former judge of the International Crimes Tribunal. He is a former member of the law commission of Bangladesh.

== Early life ==
Fazle Kabir was born on 1 January 1947 in Chamagram, Chapai Nawabganj District, East Bengal, British India.

== Career ==
In March 2010, Fazle Kabir and Justice Syed Mahmud Hossain ordered the government to protect Madhupur National Park in Tangail District.

Fazle Kabir was appointed the International Crimes Tribunal judge on 25 March 2011.

On 22 March 2013, Kabir was appointed the chairman of the International Crimes Tribunal-2. He replaced Justice Md Nizamul Huq. In December 2013, a petrol bomb was thrown at his home in Chapai Nawabganj District. He had sentenced Salahuddin Quader Chowdhury and Delwar Hossain Sayeedi to death and Ghulam Azam to life imprisonment. He issued a contempt of court rule against Human Rights Watch for criticizing the verdict against Ghulam Azam.

Fazle Kabir retired on 1 January 2014. On 23 January, he was appointed member of the Bangladesh Law Commission.

In May 2016, Bangladesh Law Commission issued a recommendation signed by its commissioners ABM Khairul Haque, M Shah Alam and ATM Fazle Kabir that the Bangladesh Press Council be given the authority to suspend the publication of a newspaper for 30 days. The Press Council responded that it did not want such authority.
