= Salou railway station =

Salou
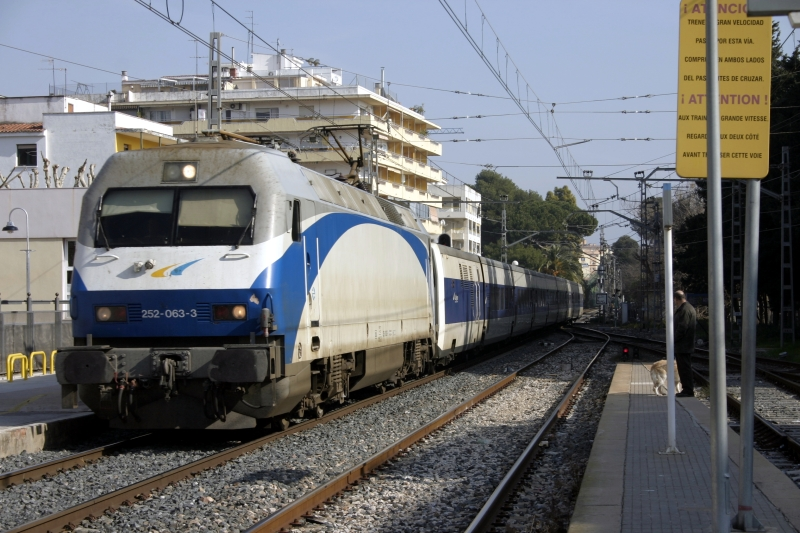
- A Talgo train in the station in 2006.

General information
- Location: Carrer de Carles Roig; Salou; Spain
- Coordinates: 41.0774°N 1.1293°E
- System: Rodalies de Catalunya commuter and regional rail station
- Owner: Adif
- Operator: Renfe Operadora
- Line: Valencia–Sant Vicenç de Calders (PK 263.6)
- Platforms: 1 side and island platform
- Tracks: 2

Construction
- Structure type: At-grade

Other information
- Station code: 65410

History
- Opened: 1865
- Closed: 13 January 2020
Location

Salou was a Rodalies de Catalunya railway station serving Salou, in Catalonia, Spain. It was served by Camp de Tarragona commuter rail service line RT2, as well as some trains on regional line R16.

The station ceased operations on 13 January 2020 due to the opening of a new line bypassing Salou and other stations in the area.
