= A. T. M. Shamsuddin =

Bangladeshi Author

- Born: 1927; Chittagong, Bengal Presidency, British India
- Died: 2009 (aged 81–82)
- Other names: Taher Shamsuddin; Charubak
- Occupation: Journalist

A. T. M. Shamsuddin (1927–2009), also known by the pen name Charubak, was a Bangladeshi author, journalist, translator, communist and union organizer. He served as the general secretary of the East Pakistan Journalists Union and as a member of the Chittagong All Party Language Movement Committee.

== Early life ==
Abu Taher Muhammad Shamsuddin, also known as Taher Shamsuddin, was born in Chittagong in southern Bengal, later Bangladesh. His father, Ahmedur Rahman, was an employee of the Kolkata port commission, and his mother died when he was three years old. His father remarried to Shamsuddin's mother's cousin, who also later died; he was raised in his maternal uncle's household.

== Active in politics ==
Shamsuddin was active against British colonial power and was jailed. When studying in class nine, he was assistant secretary of Zila Muslim Chatra League. He never graduated. Later, he was a strict communist and worked for the party while it remained underground. He joined the Pakistan Movement.

== Editor ==
Shamsuddin first joined the weekly The Daily Ittefaq. In 1961, he joined the Dhaka daily newspaper The Sangbad as an assistant editor. He served as editor for Udayan, Jubobarta, Soviet Somikkha, Soviet Review.

== Career in Soviet Embassy ==
He worked at the Soviet embassy in Dhaka and was the general manager of the press information department. He retired after 21 years.

== Works ==
He wrote many satire and adventure stories. In 1966, his first novel Bonanir Buke was published. Qazi Anwar Hussain inspired him and beginning in 1987, he wrote stories of Batamul in Rohosho Potrika. His first translation was Hoja Nasiruddin. He made many translations including Pakistan Jakhan Bhanglo, the memoirs of Lt. Gen. Gul Hassan Khan.
