= ATM (method) =

Approach to product creation in Indonesia

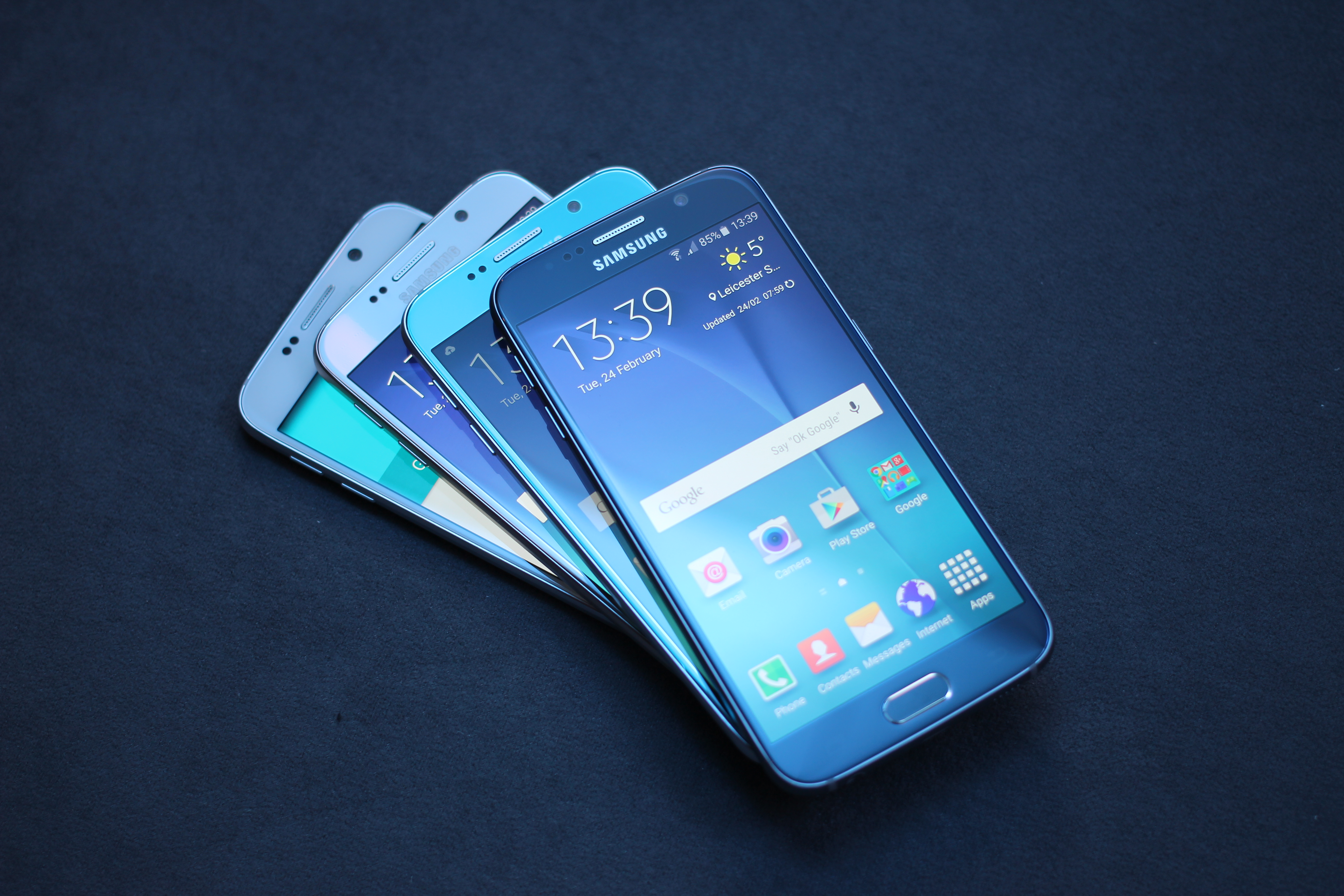
Samsung, often known for imitating innovation of Apple

ATM (Indonesian: amati, tiru, modifikasi, lit. 'observe, imitate, modify') alternately known as observe, copy, and modify (OCM) is a widely used approach in Indonesia's creative industries and business sector. It is designed to help businesses continuously develop fresh, creative, unique and competitive products or strategies. This method follows three key steps: observing (competitors, media or other sources of inspiration), imitating or copying, and modifying. At its core, this method acknowledges that no idea is truly 100% original, every innovation builds upon existing concepts. While it first gained popularity in creative industries and business, this approach has also spread to other fields, including research and literature.

The difference between this method and plagiarism is the element of modification or innovation, therefore making it legal. This method includes creativity progress to change or transform an object to imitate for unique thing.

== Observe ==
This step involves carefully studying the object to replicate, either by direct observation or through media. The goal is to evaluate and analyze its strengths, weaknesses, and areas for improvement. This process can also be approached as a small research project, such as conducting a SWOT analysis.

== Copy ==
Once the observation is complete, the next step is to replicate the object. This requires a solid understanding of how it was created, along with any legal considerations, such as patents or copyrights. Copying without adequate knowledge can lead to accusations of plagiarism or even legal violations.

== Modify ==
The object to be imitated has its deficiencies patched and its unexplored potential developed.

== Case study ==
The Samsung Galaxy Tab is believed to have been inspired by the success of the iPad. However, by introducing improvements and added value, Samsung managed to capture a significant market share and even outperformed Apple products in several countries.

== See also ==
- SWOT analysis
- Threshold of originality
- Kaizen
- PDCA
- Invention
- Innovation
- Improvement
- General line of merchandise
