= Autoritat Territorial de la Mobilitat de l'Àrea de Girona =

Autoritat Territorial de la Mobilitat de l'Àrea de Girona (ATM) or Àrea de Girona ('Territorial Mobility Authority of the region of Girona') is one of the five transport authority corporations in Catalonia responsible of coordinating the public transport system in the Àrea de Girona.

ATM is coordinating public transport in the comarques (counties) of Gironès, Pla de l'Estany and la Selva.

ATM ticketing integrated area
