= Comarques Gironines =

Vegueria (region) of Catalonia

Coordinates: 42°04′01″N 2°38′26″E

- Vegueria
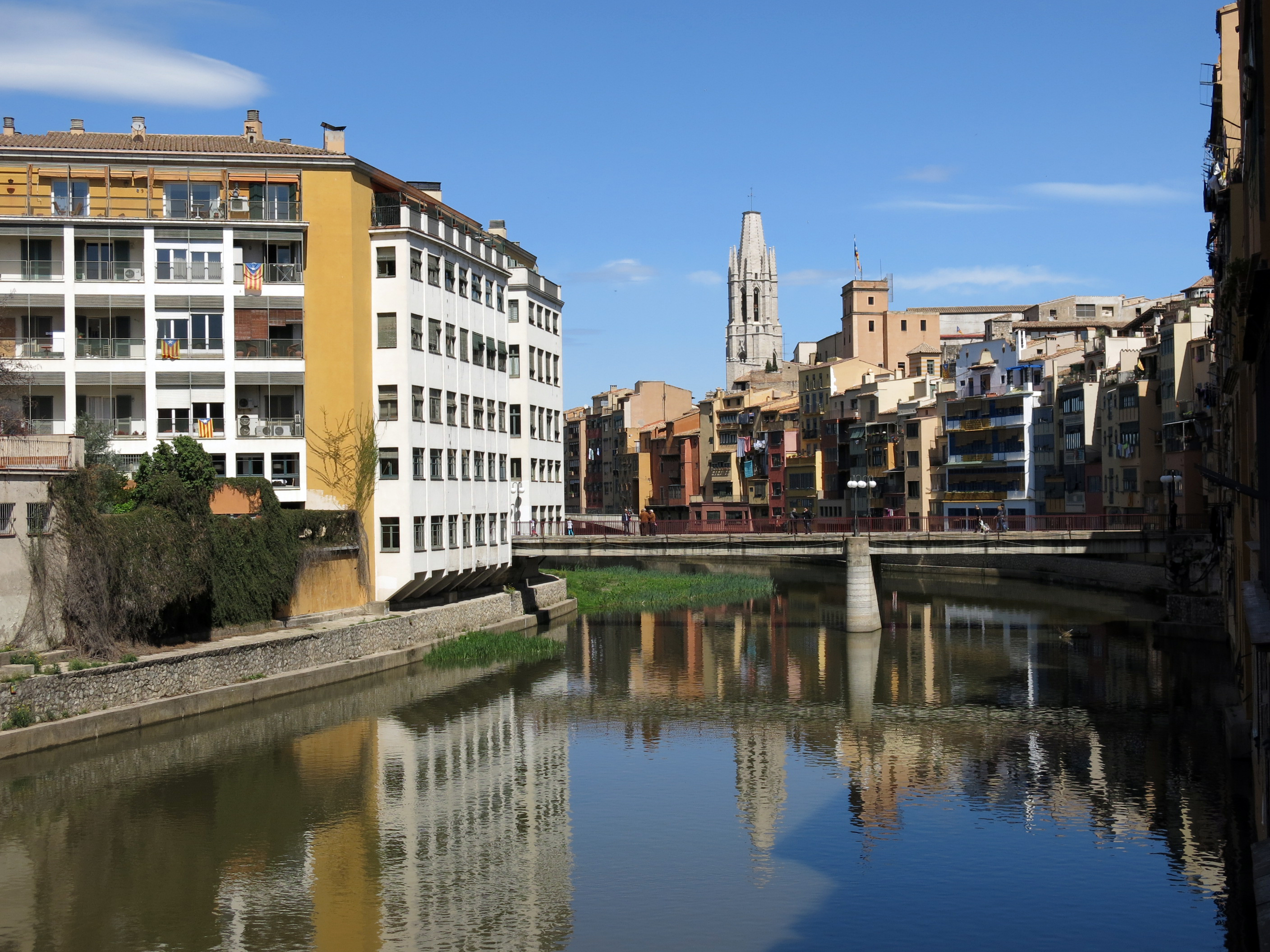
- The River Onyar in the city of Girona

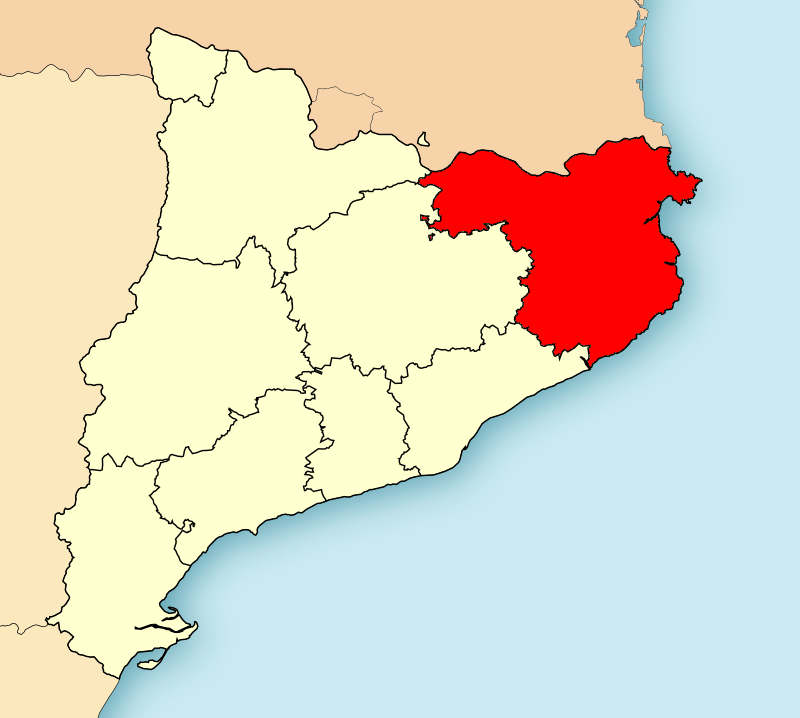
- Sovereign state: Spain
- Community: Catalonia
- Capital: Girona
- Counties: Gironès; Alt Empordà; Baix Empordà; Garrotxa; Pla de l'Estany; Ripollès; Selva

Area
  - Total: 5,584 km^{2} (2,156 sq mi)

Population (2023)
  - Total: 814,218
  - Density: 145.8/km^{2} (377.7/sq mi)

Comarques Gironines (Catalan pronunciation: [kuˈmar.kəs ʒi.ɾuˈni.nəs]; English: Girona counties) or the Girona region is the northeasternmost of the nine regions (vegueries) of Catalonia. It has an area of 5,558 km² and 814,218 inhabitants as of 2025.

Located by the border with Northern Catalonia in France, the region includes the counties of Gironès, Alt Empordà, Baix Empordà, Garrotxa, Pla de l'Estany, Ripollès and Selva. Within Catalonia, it borders Alt Pirineu to the west, Central Catalonia to the south-west and Barcelona to the south.

Its demarcation is similar to that of the Spanish province of Girona, which differs from the vegueria in that it also includes part of Baixa Cerdanya and the municipalities of Espinelves, Vidrà and Viladrau, which belong to Osona.

The county of Ripollès, along with Lluçanès and Osona in Central Catalonia, comprise the natural region and proposed separate vegueria of Alt Ter.

The region's capital is the city of Girona.

== Demography ==
Comarques Gironines is composed of seven different comarques.

Comarca	Capital	Population (2025)	Area (km^{2})	Map
Alt Empordà	Figueres	150,044	1,358	
Baix Empordà	La Bisbal d'Empordà	144,818	702	
Garrotxa	Olot	63,339	735	
Gironès	Girona	208,967	576	
Pla de l'Estany	Banyoles	33,828	263	
Ripollès	Ripoll	25,914	957	
Selva	Santa Coloma de Farners	187,308	995	

== See also ==
- Dipsalut, the region's health body
- Ter department
- Diocese of Girona
