= Autoritat Territorial de la Mobilitat de les Comarques Centrals =

Autoritat Territorial de la Mobilitat de les Comarques Centrals or ATM Comarques Centrals (Territorial Mobility Authority of Comarques Centrals) is one of the five transport authorities corporations in Catalonia responsible of coordinate public transport system in Comarques Centrals.

ATM will start to coordinate public transport in comarca of Bages (2009) and in a nearly future in other parts of Comarques Centrals.
