= Autoritat Territorial de la Mobilitat del Camp de Tarragona =

Catalonian transport authority

Autoritat Territorial de la Mobilitat del Camp de Tarragona or ATM Camp de Tarragona (Territorial Mobility Authority of Camp de Tarragona) is one of the five transport authorities corporations in Catalonia responsible of coordinate public transport system in Camp de Tarragona.

ATM is coordinating public transport in comarca of Alt Camp, Baix Camp, Baix Penedès, Conca de Barberà, Priorat and Tarragonès.

ATM ticketing integrated area
