= Autoritat Territorial de la Mobilitat de l'Àrea de Lleida =

ATM ticketing integrated area in summer 2009, including the comarques of (Garrigues, Pla d'Urgell, Segrià and Noguera).

Autoritat Territorial de la Mobilitat de l'Àrea de Lleida or ATM Àrea de Lleida (Lleida Area Territorial Mobility Authority) is one of the five transport authority corporations in Catalonia responsible for the coordination of public transport systems in Lleida and its surroundings, the Àrea de Lleida.

It's a consortium made up by the Lleida city council, the Generalitat of Catalonia and the comarcal council of el Segrià.

ATM is coordinating public transport in comarca of el Segrià and in three municipalities of la Noguera. In 2009 will incorporate to ATM comarca of les Garrigues and Pla d'Urgell and in 2010 la Segarra i l'Urgell.
