= C-1 (Cercanías Madrid) =

Spanish commuter rail service

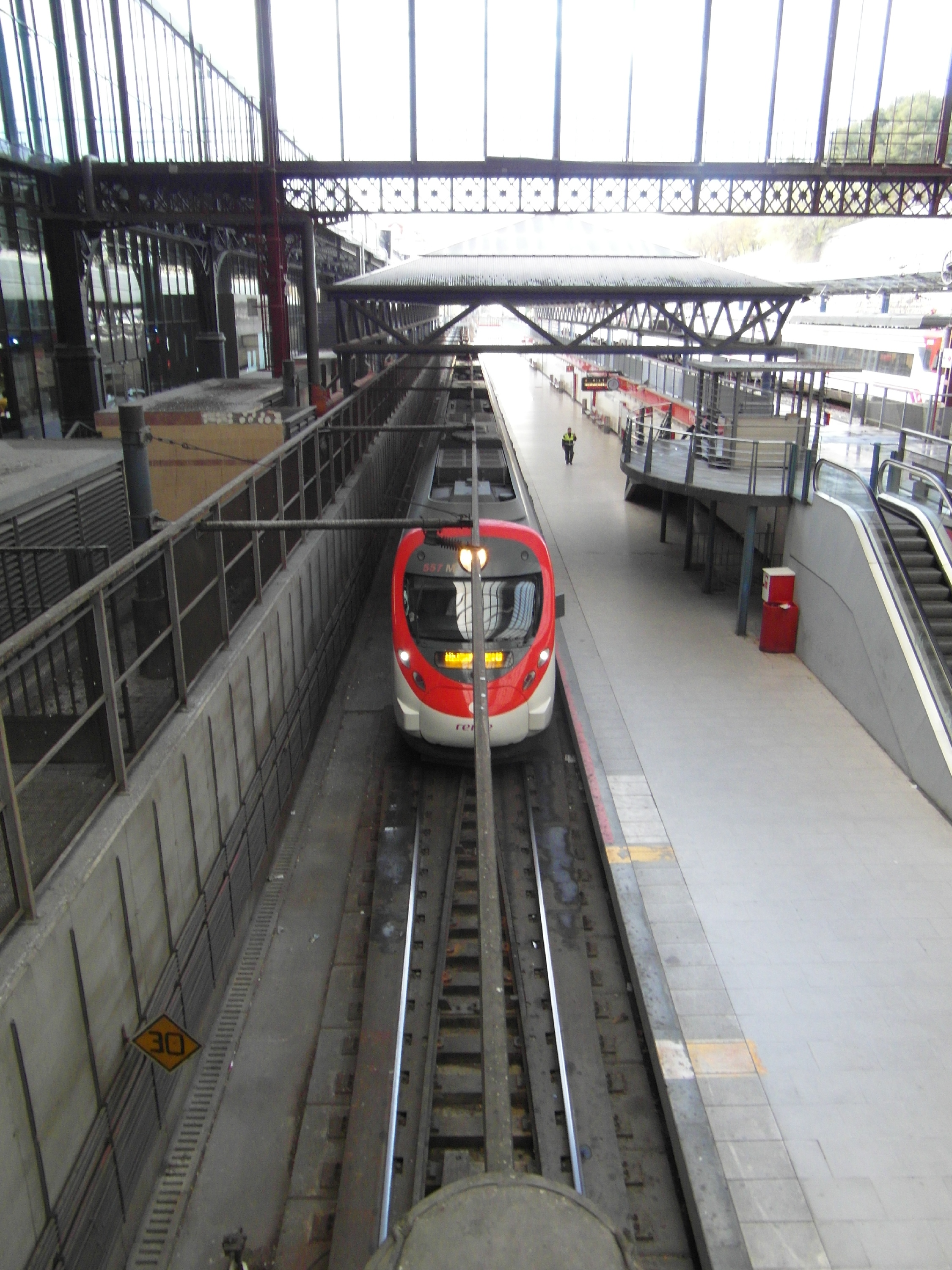
- A Civia train on a C-1 service awaiting departure towards Aeropuerto T4 at Príncipe Pío terminal station in 2012.

Overview
- Service type: Commuter rail
- System: Cercanías Madrid
- Status: Operational
- Locale: Madrid, Community of Madrid, Spain
- First service: 23 September 2011; 13 years ago
- Current operator(s): Renfe Operadora

Route
- Termini: Príncipe Pío; Aeropuerto T4
- Stops: 11
- Distance travelled: 23.6 km
- Line(s) used: Madrid Príncipe Pío–Pinar railway Madrid–Barcelona railway Madrid–Barajas Airport railway

Technical
- Rolling stock: Civia EMUs
- Track gauge: 1,668 mm (5 ft 5 21/32 in) Iberian gauge
- Electrification: 3kV AC overhead line
- Track owner(s): Adif
Route map
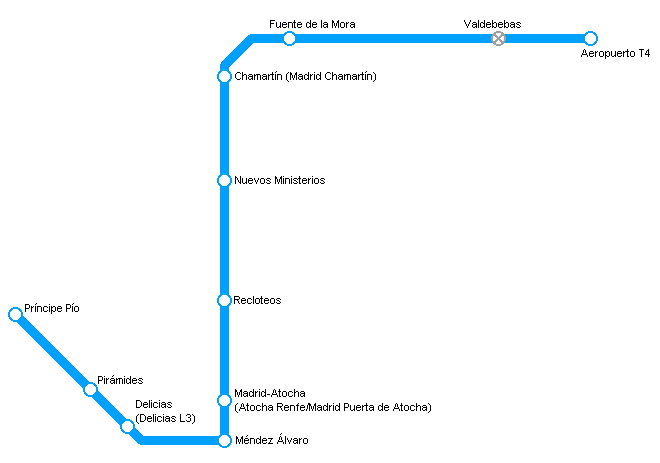

The C-1 is a rail service of Cercanías Madrid commuter rail network, operated by Renfe Operadora. It runs from Príncipe Pío station in western Madrid to Madrid Barajas Airport Terminal 4, through the city center of Madrid. The C-1 shares tracks for the majority of its length with services C-7 and C-10 (thus of which serving as a complementary line) while it also shares large parts with C-2, and C-8. The service has existed in its current form since 2011, when it opened.

== Infrastructure ==
Like the rest of Cercanías Madrid services, the C-1 runs on the Iberian gauge mainline railway system, which is owned by Adif, an agency of the Spanish government. All of the railway lines carrying Cercanias Madrid services are electrified at 3,000 volts (V) direct current (DC) using overhead lines. The C-1 operates on a total length of 23.6 kilometres (14.7 mi), which is entirely double-track. The trains on the line call at up to 11 stations, using the following railway lines, in order from north to south:

From	To	Railway line	Route number
Príncipe Pío (PK 0.1)	Madrid Atocha (PK 7.4)	Madrid-Príncipe Pío–Pinar	910
Madrid Atocha (PK 0.0)	Madrid Chamartín (PK 7.0)	Risa Tunnel	900
Madrid Chamartín (PK 0.0)	Fuente de la Mora (PK 2.8)	Madrid–Barcelona	200
Fuente de la Mora (PK 0.0)	Aeropuerto T4 (PK 5.3)	Madrid–Barajas Airport	908

== List of stations ==
The following table lists the name of each station served by C-1 in order from west to east; the station's service pattern offered by C-1 trains; the transfers to other Cercanías Madrid lines; remarkable transfers to other transport systems; the municipality in which each station is located; and the fare zone each station belongs to according to the Madrid Metro fare zone system.

#	Terminal of a service
*	Transfer station to other transport systems
#*	Transfer station and terminal
●	Station served by all trains running through it
○	Limited service station

Station	Service	Cercanías Madrid transfers	Other transfers	Municipality	Fare zone
Príncipe Pío#*	●	C-7, C-10	Madrid Metro lines 6, 10 and Ramal; National coach services	Madrid	
Pirámides*	●	C-10	Madrid Metro line 5	Madrid	
Delicias	●	C-10	—	Madrid	
Méndez Álvaro*	●	C-5, C-10	Madrid Metro line 6	Madrid	
Atocha*	●	C-2, C-3, C-3a, C-4, C-5, C-7, C-8, C-10	Renfe Operadora-operated high-speed and long-distance rail services Madrid Metro line 1 at Atocha Renfe station National and international coach services	Madrid	
Recoletos	●	C-2, C-7, C-8, C-10	—	Madrid	
Nuevos Ministerios*	●	C-2, C-3, C-3a, C-4, C-7, C-8, C-10	Madrid Metro lines 6, 8 and 10	Madrid	
Chamartín*	●	C-2, C-3, C-3a, C-4, C-7, C-8, C-10	Renfe Operadora-operated high-speed and long-distance rail services Madrid Metro lines 1 and 10; National and international coach services	Madrid	
Fuente de la Mora*	●	C-2, C-10	Madrid Metro Ligero line ML-1	Madrid	
Valdebebas	●	C-10	—	Madrid	
Aeropuerto T4#*	●	C-10	Madrid Metro line 8	Madrid	
