= C-7 (Cercanías Madrid) =

Spanish commuter rail service

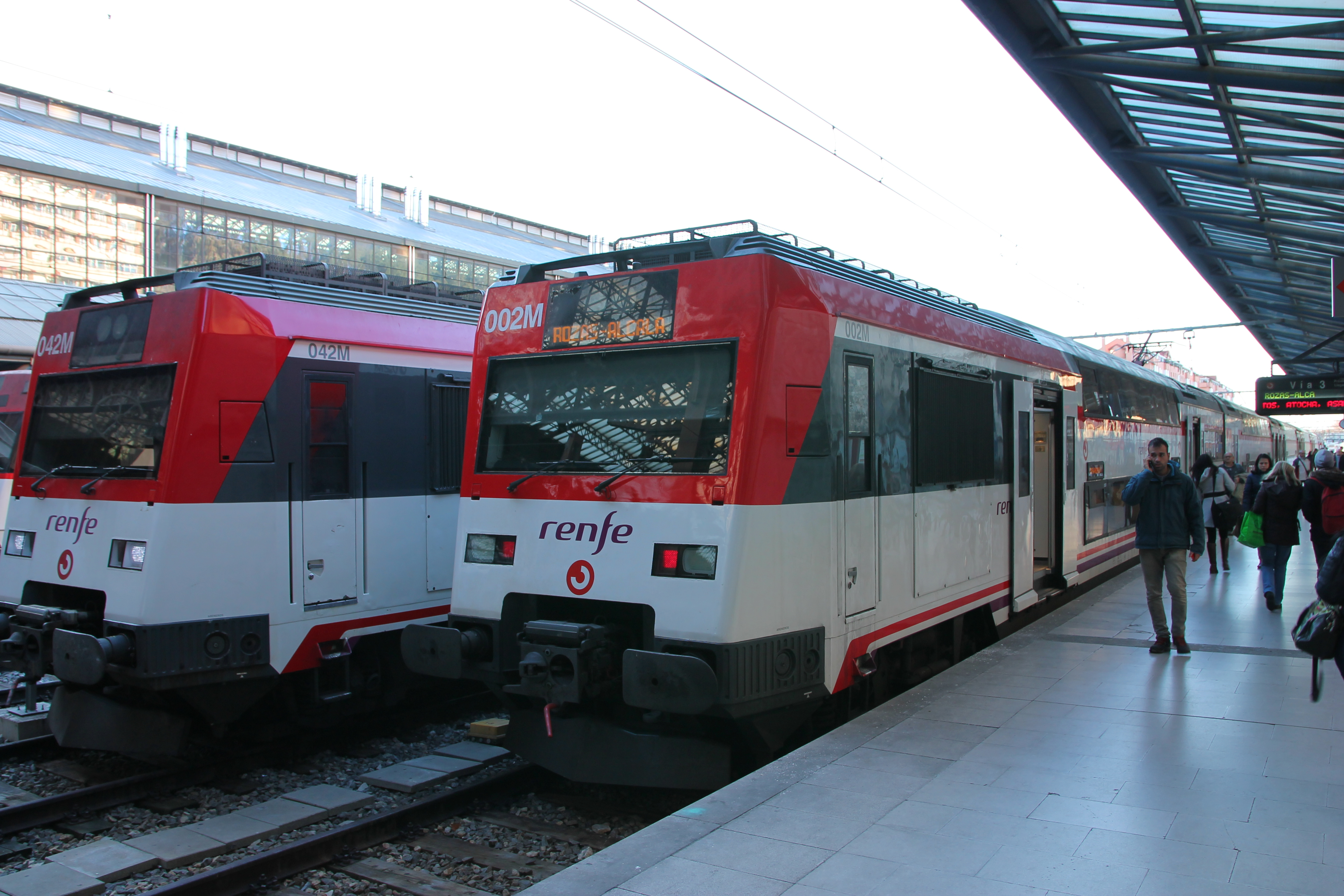
- A 450 Series train on a C-7 service towards Alcalá de Henares at Príncipe Pío station in 2017.

Overview
- Status: Operational
- Owner: Adif
- Locale: Community of Madrid, Spain
- Termini: Príncipe Pío; Alcalá de Henares
- Stations: 24

Service
- Type: Commuter rail
- System: Cercanías Madrid
- Services: Madrid-Príncipe Pío-Pinar railway Madrid-Hendaye railway Madrid-San Fernando de Henares railway Madrid-Barcelona railway
- Operator: Renfe Operadora
- Rolling stock: Civia, 446 Series, 447 Series and 450 Series EMUs

History
- Opened: 1989; 37 years ago

Technical
- Line length: 71.6 km (44.5 mi)
- Number of tracks: Double
- Track gauge: 1,668 mm (5 ft 5 21/32 in) Iberian gauge
- Electrification: 3kV AC overhead line

The C-7 is a line and rail service of Cercanías Madrid commuter rail network, operated by Renfe Operadora. It runs from Alcalá de Henares to Fuente de la Mora. It's composed of two sections: the western side is a loop around Madrid and its western suburbs, ending at Fuente de la Mora station, while the eastern side (from Atocha) runs to Alcalá de Henares.

== Infrastructure ==
Like the rest of Cercanías Madrid lines, the C-7 runs on the Iberian gauge mainline railway system, which is owned by Adif, an agency of the Spanish government. The C-7 operates on a total line length of 71.6 kilometres (44.5 mi), which is entirely double-track. The trains on the line call at up to 24 stations, using the following railway lines, in order from west to east:

From	To	Railway line	Route number
Príncipe Pío (PK 0.0)	Pinar Junction (before Pinar station) (PK 18.8)	Madrid-Príncipe Pío-Pinar	910
Pinar Junction (before Pinar station) (PK 18.8)	Madrid Chamartín (PK 0.0)	Madrid−Hendaye	100
Madrid Chamartín (PK 0.0)	Madrid Atocha (PK 7.0)	Risa Tunnel	900
Madrid Atocha (PK 0.0)	San Fernando de Henares (PK 18.3)	Madrid-San Fernando de Henares	930
San Fernando de Henares (PK 15.9)	Alcalá de Henares (PK 33.5)	Madrid-Barcelona	200

== List of stations ==
The following table lists the name of each station served by line C-7 in order from west to east; the station's service pattern offered by C-10 trains; the transfers to other Cercanías Madrid lines; remarkable transfers to other transport systems; the municipality in which each station is located; and the fare zone each station belongs to according to the Madrid Metro fare zone system.

#	Terminal of a service
*	Transfer station to other transport systems
#*	Transfer station and terminal
●	Station served by all trains running through it
○	Limited service station

Station	Service	Cercanías Madrid transfers	Other transfers	Municipality	Fare zone
Príncipe Pío #*	●	C-1, C-10	Madrid Metro lines 6, 10 and Ramal; National coach services	Madrid	
Aravaca*	●	C-10	Madrid Metro Ligero line ML-2 at Estación de Aravaca station	Madrid	
Pozuelo	●	C-10	—	Pozuelo de Alarcón	
El Barrial-Centro Comercial Pozuelo	●	C-10	—	Madrid	
Las Rozas	●	C-10	—	Las Rozas de Madrid	
Pitis*	●	C-3a, C-8	Madrid Metro line 7	Madrid	
Mirasierra-Paco de Lucía*	●	C-3a, C-8	Madrid Metro line 9	Madrid	
Ramón y Cajal	●	C-3a, C-8	—	Madrid	
Chamartín*	●	C-1, C-2, C-3, C-3a, C-4, C-8, C-10	Renfe Operadora-operated high-speed and long-distance rail services Madrid Metro lines 1 and 10; National and international coach services	Madrid	
Nuevos Ministerios*	●	C-1, C-2, C-3, C-3a, C-4, C-8, C-10	Madrid Metro lines 6, 8 and 10	Madrid	
Recoletos	●	C-1, C-2, C-8, C-10	—	Madrid	
Atocha*	●	C-1, C-2, C-3, C-3a, C-4, C-5, C-8, C-10	Renfe Operadora-operated high-speed and long-distance rail services Madrid Metro line 1 at Atocha Renfe station National and international coach services	Madrid	
Asamblea de Madrid-Entrevías	●	C-2, C-8	—	Madrid	
El Pozo	●	C-2, C-8	—	Madrid	
Vallecas*	●	C-2, C-8	Madrid Metro line 1 at Sierra de Guadalupe station	Madrid	
Santa Eugenia	●	C-2, C-8	—	Madrid	
Vicálvaro*	●	C-2, C-8	Madrid Metro line 9 at Puerta de Arganda station	Madrid	
Coslada*	●	C-2, C-8	Madrid Metro line 7 at Coslada Central station	Coslada	
San Fernando de Henares	●	C-2, C-8	—	Coslada	
Torrejón de Ardoz	●	C-2, C-8	—	Torrejón de Ardoz	
Soto del Henares	●	C-2, C-8	—	Torrejón de Ardoz	
La Garena	●	C-2, C-8	—	Alcalá de Henares	
Alcalá de Henares#*	●	C-2, C-8	Renfe Operadora-operated rail services	Alcalá de Henares	
