= C-10 (Cercanías Madrid) =

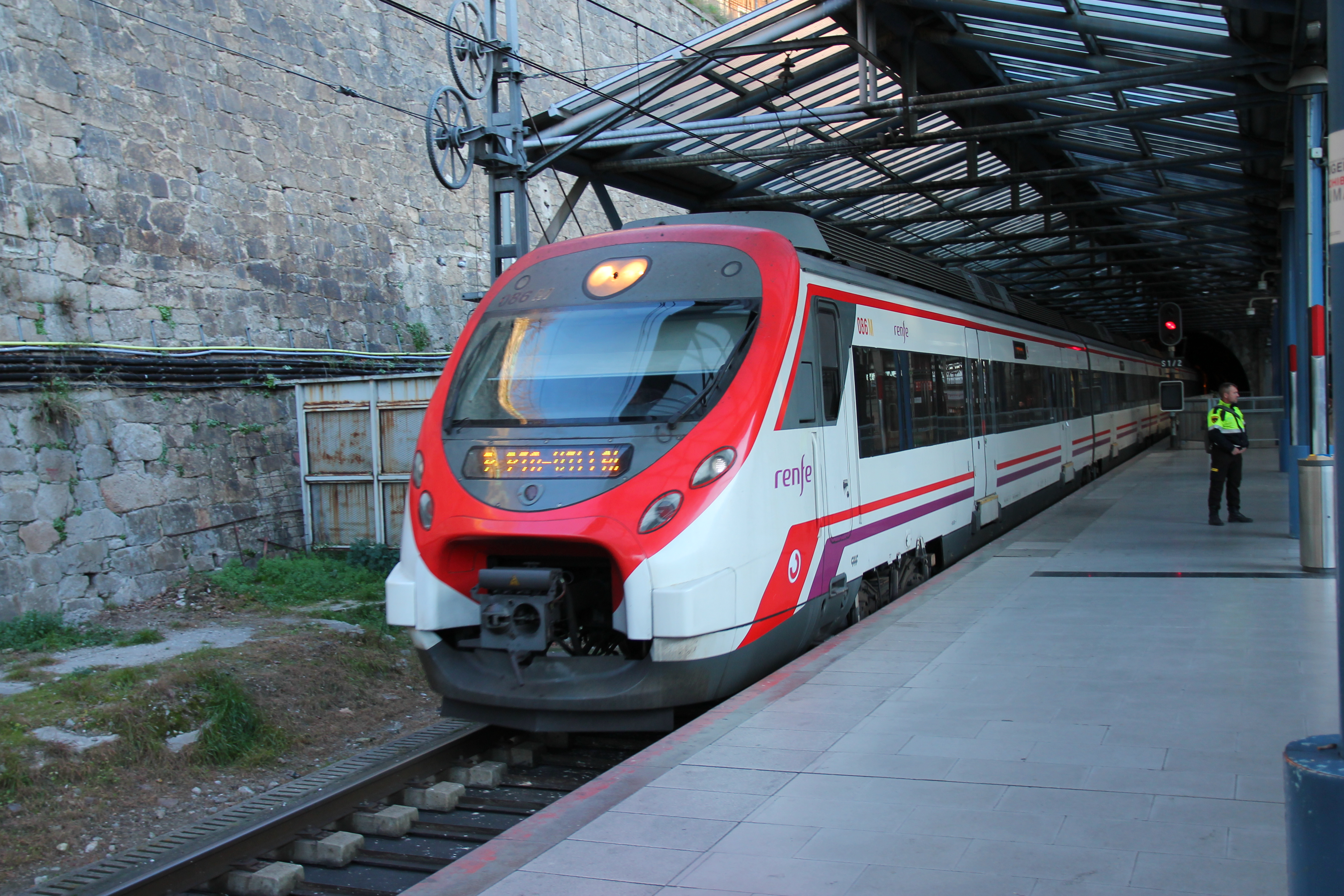
- A Civia train on a C-10 service towards Villalba pulling int Príncipe Pío station in 2017.

Overview
- Status: Operational
- Owner: Adif
- Locale: Community of Madrid, Spain
- Termini: Villalba; Aeropuerto T4
- Stations: 19 or 21(to Aeropuerto T4)

Service
- Type: Commuter rail
- System: Cercanías Madrid
- Services: Madrid-Hendaye railway Madrid-Príncipe Pío-Pinar railway Madrid-Barcelona railway Madrid-Barajas Airport railway
- Operator(s): Renfe Operadora
- Rolling stock: Civia 446 Series, 447 Series and 450 Series EMUs

History
- Opened: 2001; 25 years ago

Technical
- Line length: 71.6 km (44.5 mi)
- Number of tracks: Double
- Track gauge: 1,668 mm (5 ft 5 21/32 in) Iberian gauge
- Electrification: 3kV AC overhead line

The C-10 is a line and rail service of Cercanías Madrid commuter rail network, operated by Renfe Operadora. It runs from Villalba northwest Madrid to Fuente de la Mora, through the city center of Madrid, while trains can continue onwards to Madrid Barajas Airport. The C-10 shares tracks for the majority of its length with Madrid commuter rail service lines C-3, C-7 and C-8 while it also shares parts with C-1, and C-2. The line has been in operation since 2001.

== Infrastructure ==
Like the rest of Cercanías Madrid lines, the C-10 runs on the Iberian gauge mainline railway system, which is owned by Adif, an agency of the Spanish government. All of the railway lines carrying Cercanías services are electrified at 3,000 volts (V) direct current (DC) using overhead lines. The C-10 operates on a total line length of 71.6 kilometres (44.5 mi), which is entirely double-track. The trains on the line call at up to 21 stations, using the following railway lines, in order from west to east:

From	To	Railway line	Route number
Villalba (PK 37.8)	Pinar (PK 20.4)	Madrid−Hendaye	100
Pinar (PK 20.4)	Madrid Atocha (PK 0.0)	Madrid-Príncipe Pío-Pinar	910
Madrid Atocha (PK 0.0)	Madrid Chamartín (PK 7.0)	Risa Tunnel	900
Madrid Chamartín (PK 0.0)	Fuente de la Mora (PK 2.8)	Madrid-Barcelona	200
Fuente de la Mora (PK 0.0)	Aeropuerto T4 (PK 5.3)	Madrid-Barajas Airport	908

== List of stations ==
The following table lists the name of each station served by line C-10 in order from northwest to east; the station's service pattern offered by C-10 trains; the transfers to other Cercanías Madrid lines; remarkable transfers to other transport systems; the municipality in which each station is located; and the fare zone each station belongs to according to the Madrid Metro fare zone system.

#	Terminal of a service
*	Transfer station to other transport systems
#*	Transfer station and terminal
●	Station served by all trains running through it
○	Limited service station

Station	Service		Cercanías Madrid transfers	Other transfers	Municipality	Fare zone
Station	Regular	CIVIS	Cercanías Madrid transfers	Other transfers	Municipality	Fare zone
Villalba#*	●	●	C-3, C-8	Renfe Operadora-operated rail services National and international coach services	Collado Villalba	
Galapagar-La Navata	●		C-3, C-8	—	Galapagar	
Torrelodones	●		C-3, C-8	—	Torrelodones	
Las Matas	●		C-3, C-8	—	Las Rozas de Madrid	
Pinar	●	●	C-3, C-8	—	Las Rozas de Madrid	
Las Rozas	●	●	C-7	—	Las Rozas de Madrid	
Majadahonda	●		C-7	—	Majadahonda	
El Barrial-Centro Comercial Pozuelo	●		C-7	—	Madrid	
Pozuelo	●	●	C-7	—	Pozuelo de Alarcón	
Aravaca*	●	●	C-7	Madrid Metro Ligero line ML-2 at Estación de Aravaca station	Madrid	
Príncipe Pío*	●	●	C-1	Madrid Metro lines 6, 10 and Ramal; National coach services	Madrid	
Pirámides*	●	●	C-1	Madrid Metro line 5	Madrid	
Delicias	●	●	C-1	—	Madrid	
Méndez Álvaro*	●	●	C-1, C-5	Madrid Metro line 6	Madrid	
Atocha*	●	●	C-1, C-2, C-3, C-4, C-5, C-7, C-8	Renfe Operadora-operated high-speed and long-distance rail services Madrid Metro line 1 at Atocha Renfe station National and international coach services	Madrid	
Recoletos	●	●	C-1, C-2, C-7, C-8	—	Madrid	
Nuevos Ministerios*	●	●	C-1, C-2, C-3, C-4, C-7, C-8	Madrid Metro lines 6, 8 and 10	Madrid	
Chamartín#*	●	●	C-1, C-2, C-3, C-4, C-7, C-8	Renfe Operadora-operated high-speed and long-distance rail services Madrid Metro lines 1 and 10; National and international coach services	Madrid	
