= C-3 (Cercanías Madrid) =

Commuter rail line of Cercanías Madrid

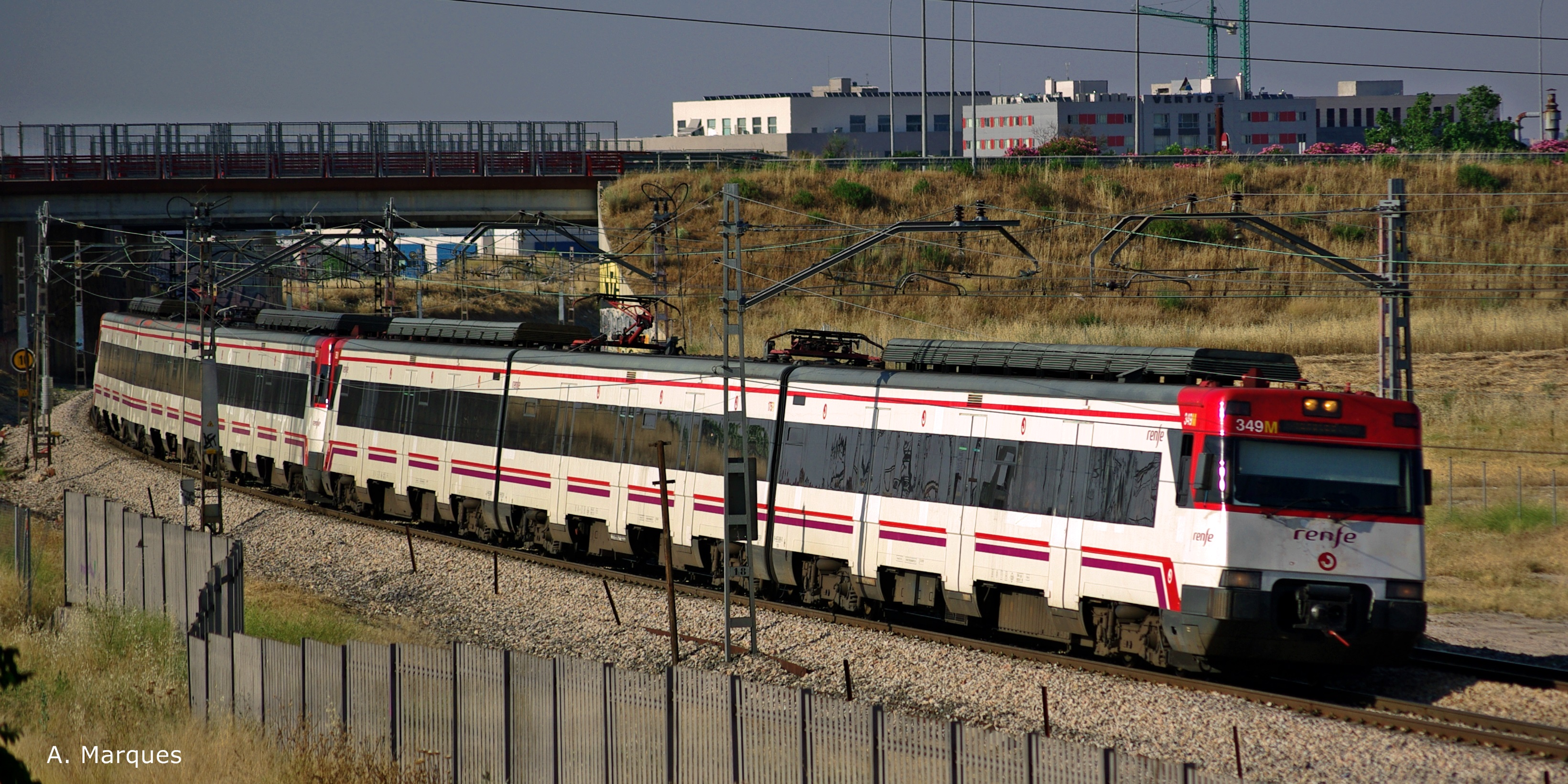
- A Class 447 train on a C-3 service near El Casar in June 2013.

Overview
- Status: Operational
- Owner: Adif
- Locale: Community of Madrid, Spain
- Termini: El Escorial; Aranjuez
- Stations: 24

Service
- Type: Commuter rail
- System: Cercanías Madrid
- Services: Madrid–Hendaye railway Madrid–Valencia railway
- Operator: Renfe Operadora
- Rolling stock: Civia 446 Series and 447 Series EMUs

History
- Opened: 1980; 46 years ago

Technical
- Line length: 106.5 km (66.2 mi)
- Number of tracks: Double
- Track gauge: 1,668 mm (5 ft 5 21/32 in) Iberian gauge
- Electrification: 3kV AC overhead line

The C-3 is a line and rail service of Cercanías Madrid commuter rail network, operated by Renfe Operadora. It runs from El Escorial northwest of Madrid to Aranjuez south of Madrid. The C-3 shares tracks for half of its length with Madrid commuter rail service line C-8 while it also shares significant parts with lines C-4, and C-7. The line has been in operation since 1980, with its current incarnation in operation since 22 September 2011.

On 5 November 2018, the C-3a service was introduced as a separation of former extended C-3 services terminating at either El Escorial or Santa María de la Alameda. The C-3a designation was formerly used for the now-closed Pinto–San Martín de la Vega branch line (es:Línea Pinto-San Martín de la Vega) branching off from Pinto to Parque Warner Madrid and San Martín de la Vega, which operated between 2002 and 2012.

== List of stations ==
The following table lists the name of each station served by line C-3 in order from northwest to south; the station's service pattern offered by C-3 trains; the transfers to other Cercanías Madrid lines; remarkable transfers to other transport systems; the municipality in which each station is located; and the fare zone each station belongs to according to the Madrid Metro fare zone system.

#	Terminal of a service
*	Transfer station to other transport systems
#*	Transfer station and terminal
●	Station served by all trains running through it
○	Limited service station

Station	Service			Cercanías Madrid transfers	Other transfers	Municipality	Fare zone
Station	C-3	C-3a	CIVIS	Cercanías Madrid transfers	Other transfers	Municipality	Fare zone
Santa María de la Alameda#*		○		—	Renfe Operadora-operated rail services	Santa María de la Alameda	
Robledo de Chavela		○		—	—	Robledo de Chavela	
Zarzalejo		○		—	—	Robledo de Chavela	
El Escorial#*		●		—	Renfe Operadora-operated rail services	El Escorial	
Las Zorreras		●		—	—	El Escorial	
San Yago		●		—	—	Galapagar	
Villalba*		●		C-8, C-10	Renfe Operadora-operated rail services National and international coach services	Collado Villalba	
Galapagar-La Navata		●		C-8, C-10	—	Galapagar	
Torrelodones		●		C-8, C-10	—	Torrelodones	
Las Matas		●		C-8, C-10	—	Las Rozas de Madrid	
Pinar		●		C-8, C-10	—	Las Rozas de Madrid	
Pitis*		●		C-7, C-8	Madrid Metro line 7	Madrid	
Mirasierra-Paco de Lucía*		●		C-7, C-8	Madrid Metro line 9	Madrid	
Ramón y Cajal		●		C-7, C-8	—	Madrid	
Chamartín#*	●	●	●	C-1, C-2, C-4, C-7, C-8	Renfe Operadora-operated high-speed and long-distance rail services Madrid Metro lines 1 and 10; National and international coach services	Madrid	
Nuevos Ministerios*	●	●	●	C-1, C-2, C-4, C-7, C-8, C-10	Madrid Metro lines 6, 8 and 10	Madrid	
Sol*	●	●	●	C-4	Madrid Metro lines 1, 2 and 3	Madrid	
Atocha*	●	●	●	C-1, C-2, C-4, C-5, C-7, C-8, C-10	Renfe Operadora-operated high-speed and long-distance rail services Madrid Metro line 1 at Atocha Renfe station National and international coach services	Madrid	
Villaverde Bajo	●	●		C-4	—	Madrid	
San Cristóbal de Los Ángeles	●	●		—	—	Madrid	
San Cristóbal Industrial	●	●		—	—	Madrid	
El Casar*	●	●	●	—	Madrid Metro lines 3 and 12	Getafe	
Getafe Industrial	●	●		—	—	Getafe	
Pinto	●	●	●	—	—	Pinto	
Valdemoro	●	●	●	—	—	Valdemoro	
Ciempozuelos	●	●	●	—	—	Ciempozuelos	
Aranjuez#*	●	●	●	—	Renfe Operadora-operated rail services National and international coach services	Aranjuez	
