= Nuevos Ministerios (Madrid Metro) =

Madrid Metro station

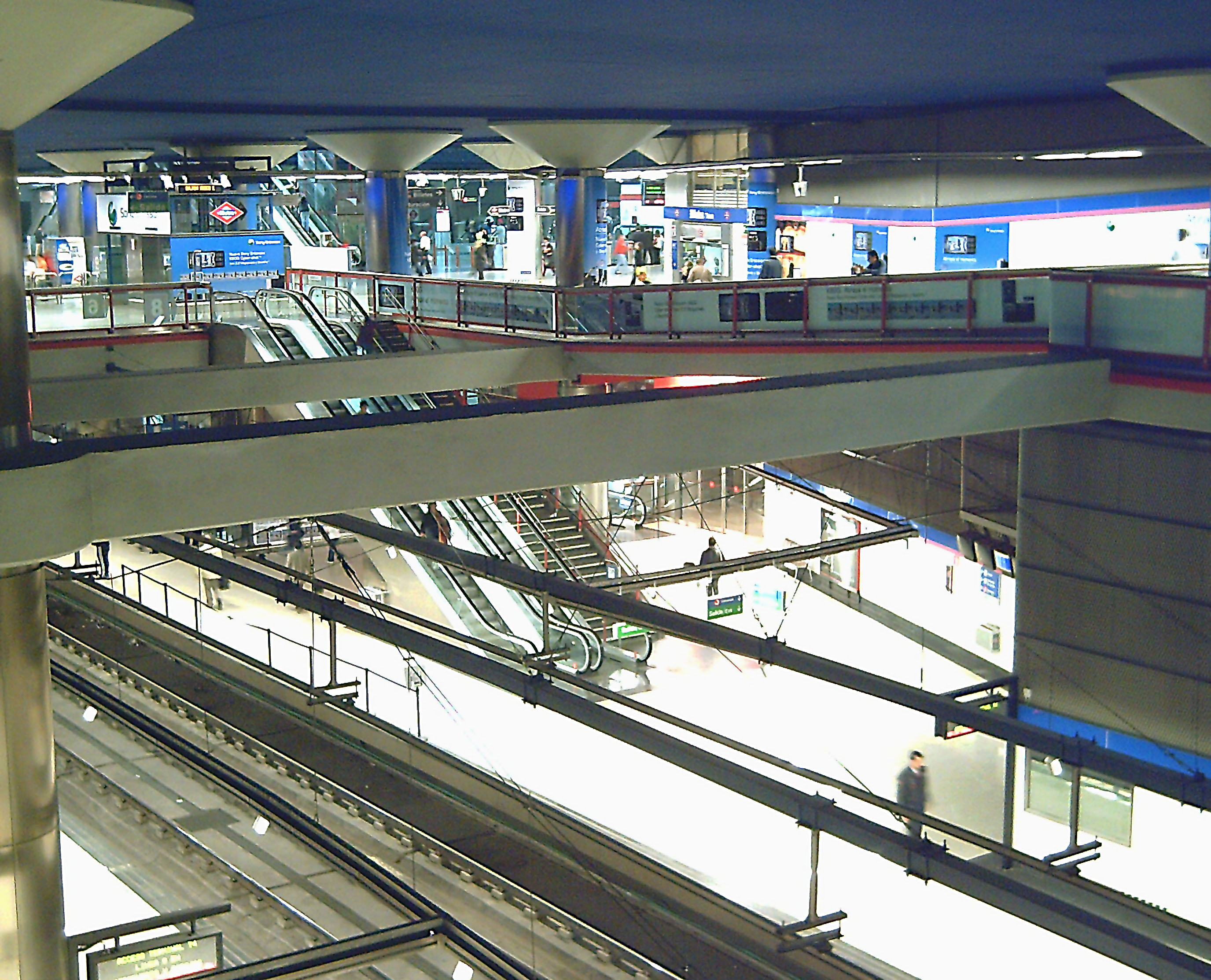

General information
- Location: Chamartín / Chamberí / Tetuán, Madrid; Spain
- Coordinates: 40.4466221°N 3.6924595°W
- System: Madrid Metro station
- Owner: CRTM
- Operator: CRTM

Construction
- Structure type: Underground
- Accessible: yes

Other information
- Fare zone: A

History
- Opened: 11 October 1979; 46 years ago

Services
Preceding station	Madrid Metro	Following station
República Argentina clockwise / outer	Line 6	Cuatro Caminos anticlockwise / inner
Terminus	Line 8	Colombia towards Aeropuerto T4
Santiago Bernabéu towards Hospital Infanta Sofía	Line 10	Gregorio Marañón towards Puerta del Sur
Out of system interchange
Preceding station	Renfe Operadora	Following station
Madrid Chamartín towards Segovia	Media Distancia 53	Recoletos towards Madrid Atocha
Preceding station	Cercanías Madrid	Following station
Chamartín Terminus	C-2	Recoletos towards Guadalajara
Chamartín Terminus	C-3	Sol towards Aranjuez
Chamartín towards Alcobendas-San Sebastián de los Reyes or Colmenar Viejo	C-4	Sol towards Parla
Chamartín towards Príncipe Pío	C-7	Recoletos towards Alcalá de Henares
Chamartín towards Santa María de la Alameda or Cercedilla	C-8	Recoletos towards Guadalajara
Chamartín Terminus	C-10	Recoletos towards Villalba
Location
- Location within Madrid

Nuevos Ministerios [ˈnweβos minisˈteɾjos] is a major multimodal rail station on the Madrid Metro and the Cercanías Madrid commuter rail network. It is located beneath the Nuevos Ministerios (New Ministries) government complex and the AZCA financial centre at the junction of the Paseo de la Castellana and Joaquín Costa and Raimundo Fernández Villaverde streets in Madrid, Spain. It services the districts of Tetuán, Chamberí, and Chamartín. The station serves Metro Line 6, Line 8, and Line 10, as well as Cercanías Lines C-2, C-3, C-4, C-7, C-8, and C-10. It is located in Metro fare zone A and Cercanías fare zone 0.

== History ==
The railway station currently used by Cercanías Madrid was inaugurated on 18 July 1967 as part of the original Atocha–Chamartín Rail Tunnel. The tunnel connected the long-distance rail stations of Chamartín and Atocha, and was popularly called the Túnel de la risa (Laughing Tunnel) due to its perceived similarity to an amusement park attraction.

The Metro station opened twelve years later on 10 October 1979 when the first segment of Line 6 was inaugurated, running from Cuatro Caminos to Pacífico and including a stop at Nuevos Ministerios. The Metro and Cercanías stations are connected underground with hallways.

On 10 June 1982, a second set of platforms was added to the Metro station when the first segment of the old Line 8 was inaugurated, running from Fuencarral to Nuevos Ministerios. In 1986, the old Line 8 was extended from Nuevos Ministerios to Avenida de América. However, in 1996, work began on a project to connect Line 10 and Line 8, absorbing Line 8 into Line 10, and Line 8 service between Nuevos Ministerios and Avenida de América was suspended. On 22 January 1998, the new combined Line 10 was opened, connecting the station to Fuencarral in the north and Aluche in the south.

In 2001, the Line 10 platforms were closed while Line 10 was converted from narrow-profile to wide-profile trains. Also in 2001, work began on a project to extend the current Line 8 to Nuevos Ministerios, providing more direct access from downtown Madrid to the Adolfo Suárez Madrid–Barajas Airport, which is located on Line 8. The Line 8 platforms were inaugurated in 2002. Between 2002 and 2006, the station featured a service allowing passengers to check in for selected flights at Nuevos Ministerios and then board a train to the airport. The service was ultimately abandoned for security reasons.

On 9 July 2008, a second tunnel was added to the Atocha–Chamartín Rail Tunnel, increasing the number of Cercanías platforms to six. From 2011 to 2024, the station offered service on the Cercanías C-1 Line to Aeropuerto T4, meaning there were two direct rail services between Nuevos Ministerios and Barajas Airport. Due to construction work at Chamartín station, the service was cut back to a Chamartin - Airport shuttle in 2024.

The Cercanías station currently serves lines C-2, C-3, C-4, C-7, C-8, and C-10.

The vestibule between Metro Line 8 and 10 and the Cercanías station is large enough that it is occasionally used for events and shows.
