= Class 465 =

Class 465 may refer to:

- British Rail Class 465
- Cercanias Class 463 & 465
