= C-8 (Cercanías Madrid) =

Commuter rail line of Cercanías Madrid

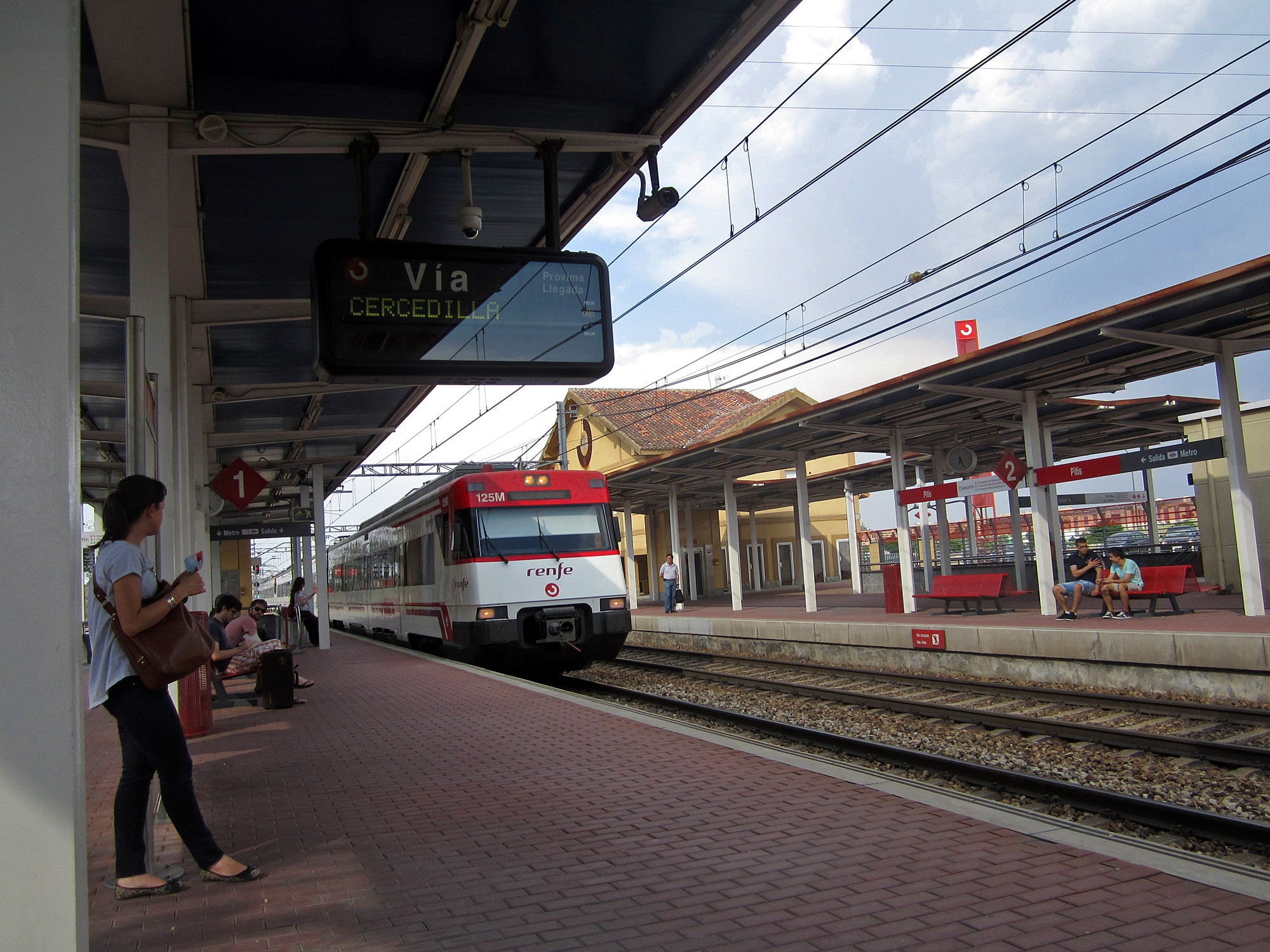
- A 446 Series train on a C-8 service towards Cercedilla pulling into Pitis station in 2013.

Overview
- Status: Operational
- Owner: Adif
- Locale: Community of Madrid, Spain
- Termini: Cercedilla; Guadalajara
- Stations: 32

Service
- Type: Commuter rail
- System: Cercanías Madrid
- Services: Villalba-Segovia railway Madrid-Hendaye railway Madrid-San Fernando de Henares railway Madrid-Barcelona railway
- Operator(s): Renfe Operadora
- Rolling stock: 446 Series, 447 Series and 450 Series EMUs

History
- Opened: 1989; 37 years ago

Technical
- Line length: 135 km (84 mi)
- Number of tracks: Double
- Track gauge: 1,668 mm (5 ft 5 21/32 in) Iberian gauge
- Electrification: 3kV AC overhead line

The C-8 is a line and rail service of Cercanías Madrid commuter rail network, operated by Renfe Operadora. It runs from Cercedilla northwest of Madrid to Guadalajara railway station. The C-8 shares tracks for the majority its length with Madrid commuter rail service line C-3 while it also shares significant parts with lines C-7, and C-10.

== Infrastructure ==
Like the rest of Cercanías Madrid lines, the C-8 runs on the Iberian gauge mainline railway system, which is owned by Adif, an agency of the Spanish government. All of the railway lines carrying Cercanías Madrid services are electrified at 3,000 volts (V) direct current (DC) using overhead lines. The C-8 operates on a total line length of 135 kilometres (84 mi), which is entirely double-track. The trains on the line call at up to 32 stations, using the following railway lines, in order from west to east:

From	To	Railway line	Route number
Cercedilla (PK 19.7)	Villalba (PK 0.0)	Villalba-Segovia	110
Villalba (PK 37.8)	Madrid Chamartín (PK 0.0)	Madrid−Hendaye	100
Madrid Chamartín (PK 0.0)	Madrid Atocha (PK 7.0)	Risa Tunnel	900
Madrid Atocha (PK 0.0)	San Fernando de Henares (PK 18.3)	Madrid-San Fernando de Henares	930
San Fernando de Henares (PK 15.9)	Guadalajara (PK 56.8)	Madrid-Barcelona	200

== List of stations ==
The following table lists the name of each station served by line C-8 in order from west to east; the station's service pattern offered by C-8 trains; the transfers to other Cercanías Madrid lines; remarkable transfers to other transport systems; the municipality in which each station is located; and the fare zone each station belongs to according to the Madrid Metro fare zone system.

#	Terminal of a service
*	Transfer station to other transport systems
#*	Transfer station and terminal
●	Station served by all trains running through it
○	Limited service station

Station	Service	Cercanías Madrid transfers	Other transfers	Municipality	Fare zone
Cercedilla#*	●	C-9	Renfe Operadora-operated rail services	Cercedilla	
Los Molinos	●	—	—	Los Molinos	
Collado Mediano	●	—	—	Collado Mediano	
Alpedrete	●	—	—	Alpedrete	
Los Negrales	●	—	—	Alpedrete	
Villalba*	●	C-3a, C-10	Renfe Operadora-operated rail services	Collado Villalba	
Galapagar-La Navata	●	C-3a, C-10	—	Galapagar	
Torrelodones	●	C-3a, C-10	—	Torrelodones	
Las Matas	●	C-3a, C-10	—	Las Rozas de Madrid	
Pinar	●	C-3a, C-10	—	Las Rozas de Madrid	
Pitis*	●	C-3a, C-7	Madrid Metro line 7	Madrid	
Mirasierra-Paco de Lucía*	●	C-3a, C-7	Madrid Metro line 9	Madrid	
Ramón y Cajal	●	C-3a, C-7	—	Madrid	
Chamartín*	●	C-1, C-2, C-3, C-3a, C-4, C-7, C-10	Renfe Operadora-operated high-speed and long-distance rail services Madrid Metro lines 1 and 10; National and international coach services	Madrid	
Nuevos Ministerios*	●	C-1, C-2, C-3, C-3a, C-4, C-7, C-10	Madrid Metro lines 6, 8 and 10	Madrid	
Recoletos	●	C-1, C-2, C-7, C-10	—	Madrid	
Atocha*	●	C-1, C-2, C-3, C-3a, C-4, C-5, C-7, C-10	Renfe Operadora-operated high-speed and long-distance rail services Madrid Metro line 1 at Atocha Renfe station National and international coach services	Madrid	
Asamblea de Madrid-Entrevías	●	C-2, C-7	—	Madrid	
El Pozo	●	C-2, C-7	—	Madrid	
Vallecas*	●	C-2, C-7	Madrid Metro line 1 at Sierra de Guadalupe station	Madrid	
Santa Eugenia	●	C-2, C-7	—	Madrid	
Vicálvaro*	●	C-2, C-7	Madrid Metro line 9 at Puerta de Arganda station	Madrid	
Coslada*	●	C-2, C-7	Madrid Metro line 7 at Coslada Central station	Coslada	
San Fernando de Henares	●	C-2, C-7	—	Coslada	
Torrejón de Ardoz	●	C-2, C-7	—	Torrejón de Ardoz	
Soto del Henares	●	C-2, C-7	—	Torrejón de Ardoz	
La Garena	●	C-2, C-7	—	Alcalá de Henares	
Alcalá de Henares*	●	C-2, C-7	Renfe Operadora-operated rail services	Alcalá de Henares	
Alcalá de Henares Universidad	●	C-2	—	Alcalá de Henares	
Meco	●	C-2	—	Meco	
Azuqueca	●	C-2	—	Azuqueca de Henares	
Guadalajara#*	●	C-2	Renfe Operadora-operated rail services	Guadalajara	
