= Méndez Álvaro (Madrid Metro) =

Madrid Metro station

- Platforms of the station

General information
- Location: Arganzuela, Madrid; Spain
- Coordinates: 40.3956°N 3.678226°W
- System: Madrid Metro station
- Owner: CRTM
- Operator: CRTM

Construction
- Accessible: No

Other information
- Fare zone: A

History
- Opened: 11 October 1979

Services
| Preceding station | Madrid Metro | Following station |
|---|---|---|
| Arganzuela-Planetario clockwise / outer | Line 6 | Pacífico anticlockwise / inner |
Out of system interchange
| Preceding station | Cercanías Madrid | Following station |
| Delicias towards Príncipe Pío | C-1 | Atocha towards Aeropuerto T4 |
| Doce de Octubre towards Humanes | C-5 | Atocha towards Móstoles-El Soto |
| Delicias towards Villalba | C-10 | Atocha towards Chamartín |
Location
- Location within Madrid

Méndez Álvaro [ˈmendeθ ˈalβaɾo] is a Madrid Metro, Cercanías and international bus station in Madrid city center. It was opened on 7 May 1981 and is near Atocha railway station in fare Zone A. It is named for the Calle de Méndez Álvaro, named in turn for former mayor Francisco Méndez Álvaro (1806–1883).
