= C-2 (Cercanías Madrid) =

Spanish commuter rail service

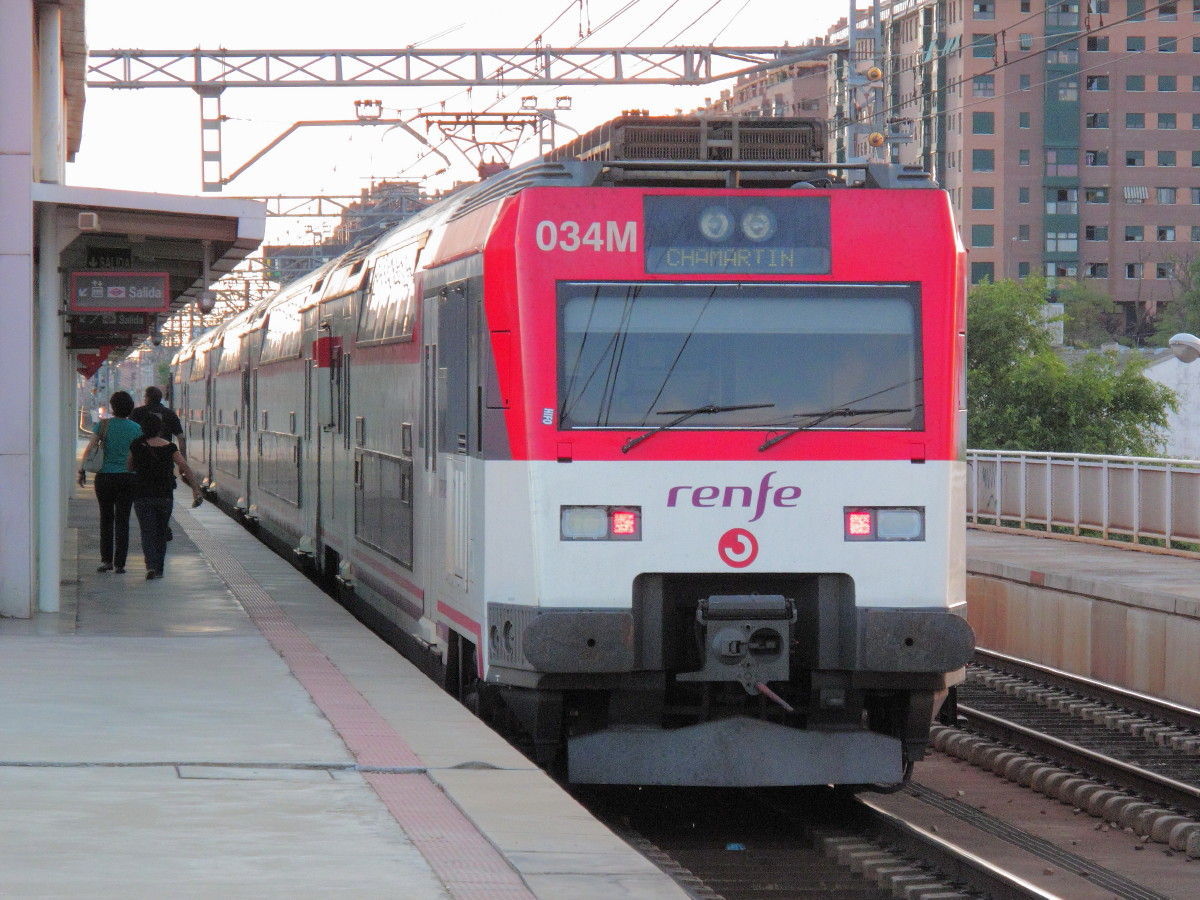
- A 450 Series train on a C-2 service towards Chamartín calling at Vallecas station in 2012.

Overview
- Status: Operational
- Owner: Adif
- Locale: Community of Madrid, Spain
- Termini: Chamartín; Guadalajara
- Stations: 19

Service
- Type: Commuter rail
- System: Cercanías Madrid
- Services: Madrid-Barcelona railway Madrid-San Fernando de Henares railway
- Operator(s): Renfe Operadora
- Rolling stock: 446 Series and 450 Series EMUs

History
- Opened: 1989; 37 years ago

Technical
- Line length: 65 km (40 mi)
- Number of tracks: Double
- Track gauge: 1,668 mm (5 ft 5 21/32 in) Iberian gauge
- Electrification: 3kV AC overhead line

The C-2 is a rail service of the Cercanías Madrid commuter rail network, operated by Renfe Operadora. It runs from Guadalajara to Chamartín.

== Infrastructure ==
Like the rest of Cercanías Madrid services, the C-2 runs on the Iberian gauge mainline railway system, which is owned by Adif, an agency of the Spanish government. The C-2 operates on a total length of 65.8 kilometres (40.9 mi), which is entirely double-track. The trains of the C-2 service call at up to 19 stations, using the following railway lines, in order from west to east:

From	To	Railway line	Line number
Madrid Chamartín (PK 0.0)	San Fernando de Henares (PK 15.9)	Madrid–Barcelona	200
Madrid Chamartín (PK 0.0)	Madrid Atocha (PK 7.0)	Risa Tunnel	900
Madrid Atocha (PK 0.0)	San Fernando de Henares (PK 18.3)	Madrid–San Fernando de Henares	930
San Fernando de Henares (PK 15.9)	Guadalajara (PK 56.8)	Madrid–Barcelona	200

== List of stations ==
The following table lists the name of each station served by the C-2 in order from west to east; the station's service pattern offered by C-8 trains; the transfers to other Cercanías Madrid services; remarkable transfers to other transport systems; the municipality in which each station is located; and the fare zone each station belongs to according to the Madrid Metro fare zone system.

#	Terminal of a service
*	Transfer station to other transport systems
#*	Transfer station and terminal
●	Station served by all trains running through it
○	Limited service station

Station	Service		Cercanías Madrid transfers	Other transfers	Municipality	Fare zone
Station	Regular	CIVIS	Cercanías Madrid transfers	Other transfers	Municipality	Fare zone
Chamartín#*	●	●	C-1, C-3, C-3a, C-4, C-7, C-8, C-10	Renfe Operadora-operated high-speed and long-distance rail services Madrid Metro lines 1 and 10; National and international coach services	Madrid	
Fuente de la Mora*		●	C-1, C-10	Madrid Metro Ligero line ML-1	Madrid	
Nuevos Ministerios*	●		C-1, C-3, C-3a, C-4, C-7, C-8, C-10	Madrid Metro lines 6, 8 and 10	Madrid	
Recoletos	●		C-1, C-7, C-8, C-10	—	Madrid	
Atocha*	●		C-1, C-3, C-3a, C-4, C-5, C-7, C-8, C-10	Renfe Operadora-operated high-speed and long-distance rail services Madrid Metro line 1 at Atocha Renfe station National and international coach services	Madrid	
Asamblea de Madrid-Entrevías	●		C-7, C-8	—	Madrid	
El Pozo	●		C-7, C-8	—	Madrid	
Vallecas*	●		C-7, C-8	Madrid Metro line 1 at Sierra de Guadalupe station	Madrid	
Santa Eugenia	●		C-7, C-8	—	Madrid	
Vicálvaro*	●		C-7, C-8	Madrid Metro line 9 at Puerta de Arganda station	Madrid	
Coslada*	●		C-7, C-8	Madrid Metro line 7 at Coslada Central station	Coslada	
San Fernando de Henares	●		C-7, C-8	—	Coslada	
Torrejón de Ardoz	●	●	C-7, C-8	—	Torrejón de Ardoz	
Soto del Henares	●		C-7, C-8	—	Torrejón de Ardoz	
La Garena	●		C-7, C-8	—	Alcalá de Henares	
Alcalá de Henares*	●	●	C-7, C-8	Renfe Operadora-operated rail services	Alcalá de Henares	
Alcalá de Henares Universidad	●	●	C-8	—	Alcalá de Henares	
Meco	●		C-8	—	Meco	
Azuqueca	●	●	C-8	—	Azuqueca de Henares	
Guadalajara#*	●	●	C-8	Renfe Operadora-operated rail services	Guadalajara	
