= Madrid–Hendaye railway =

Spanish railway line

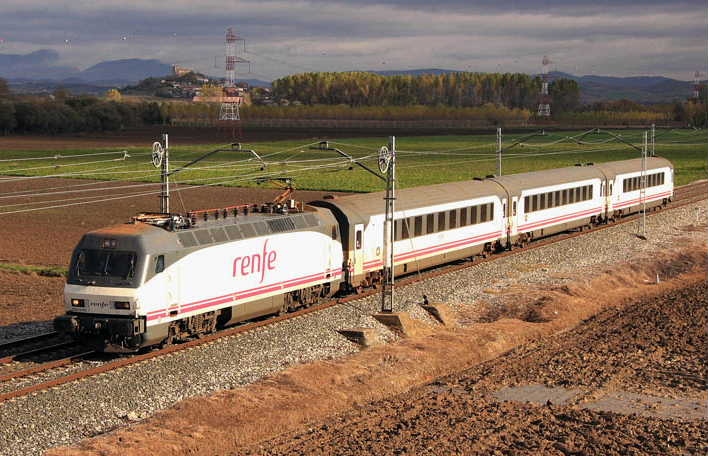
- A Renfe Class 252 train on the line near Vitoria-Gasteiz, in the Basque Country.

Overview
- Status: Operational
- Owner: Adif
- Termini: Madrid Chamartín; Hendaye

Service
- Operator(s): Renfe Operadora

History
- Opened: 1864

Technical
- Line length: 641.6 km (398.7 mi)
- Track gauge: 1,668 mm (5 ft 5 21/32 in) Iberian gauge
- Operating speed: 200 km/h (120 mph)

The Madrid–Hendaye railway, also known as the Madrid-Irún railway, General del Norte Line or Imperial Line, is a 641.6 km railway line linking the Spanish capital of Madrid with the French border at Irún and Hendaye, serving important northern Spanish cities including San Sebastián, Vitoria-Gasteiz and Valladolid.

== Services ==
The line is used by the Cercanías San Sebastián commuter rail line between San Sebastián and Irún, and Cercanías Madrid lines C-3, C-8 and C-10. Direct Madrid to Irun services often use the Madrid–León high-speed rail line between Madrid and Valladolid-Campo Grande and switching to the Madrid-Hendaye line for the rest of the journey as Alvia services. Various Renfe Media Distancia services operate on different stretches of track, mostly in Castile and León, and an Intercity service operates between A Coruña and Hendaye.

The mostly single-track Casetas–Bilbao railway to Bilbao-Abando forms a junction with the Madrid–Hendaye route at Miranda de Ebro. At Venta de Baños, the line to Gijón begins.
