= Príncipe Pío (Madrid Metro) =

Railway station in Spain

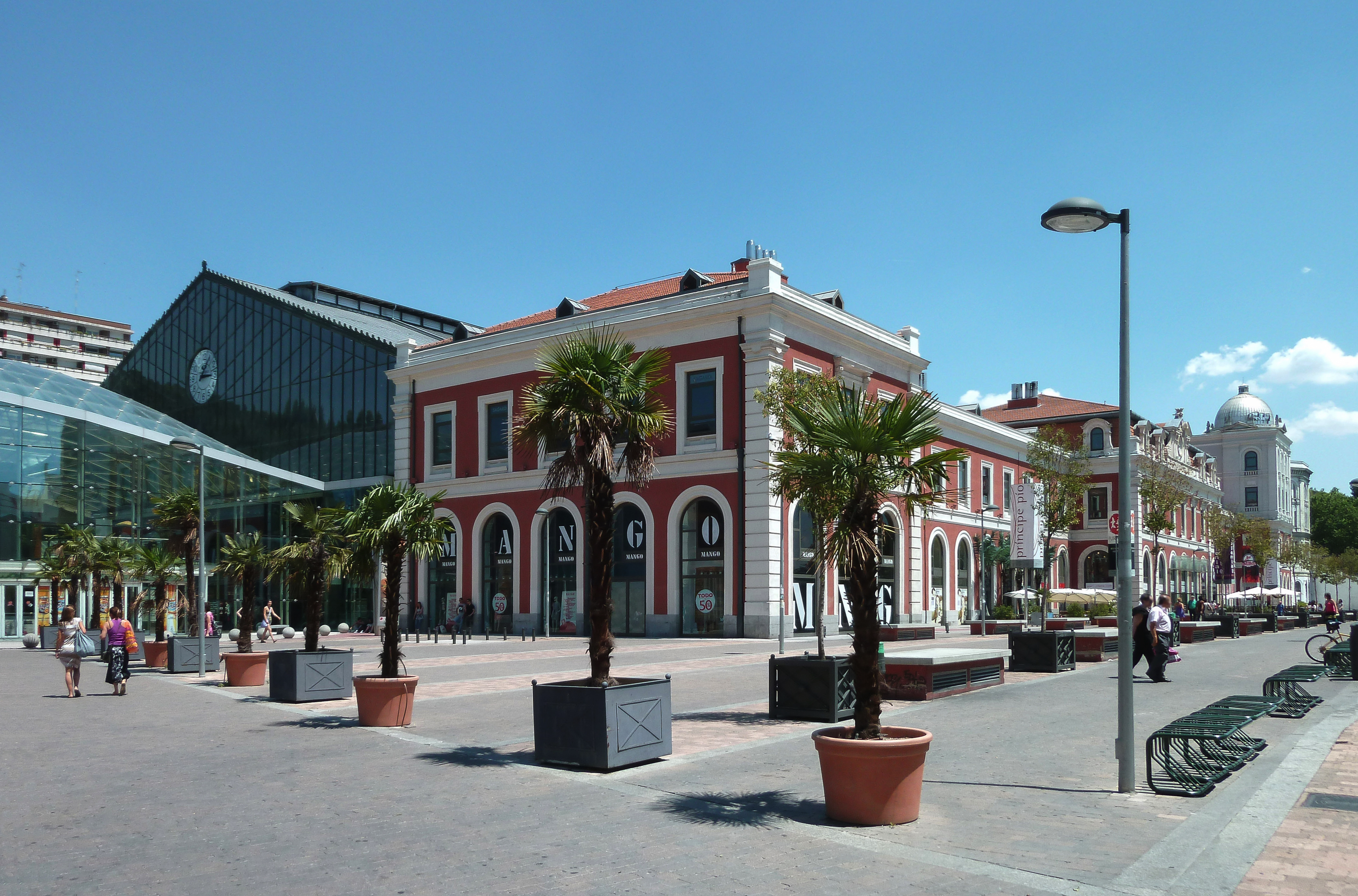
- Príncipe Pío station exterior

General information
- Location: Moncloa-Aravaca, Madrid; Spain
- Coordinates: 40.4210681°N 3.7203687°W
- System: Madrid Metro station
- Owner: CRTM
- Operator: CRTM
- Platforms: 3 island platforms (Cercanías); 2 island platforms and 2 side platforms (Metro)
- Tracks: 13

Construction
- Structure type: Open-cut
- Accessible: yes

Other information
- Fare zone: A

History
- Opened: 27 December 1925; 100 years ago (original station); 10 May 1995; 31 years ago (current station)
- Closed: 31 January 1993 (original station)
- Rebuilt: 1993–1995

Services
Preceding station	Renfe Operadora	Following station
Terminus	Media Distancia 13	Villalba towards Salamanca
Terminus	Media Distancia 16	Villalba towards Valladolid-Campo Grande
Preceding station	Cercanías Madrid	Following station
Terminus	C-1	Pirámides towards Aeropuerto T4
Aravaca towards Alcalá de Henares	C-7	Terminus
Aravaca towards Villalba	C-10	Pirámides towards Chamartín
Preceding station	Madrid Metro	Following station
Argüelles clockwise / outer	Line 6	Puerta del Ángel anticlockwise / inner
Plaza de España towards Hospital Infanta Sofía	Line 10	Lago towards Puerta del Sur
Ópera Terminus	Ramal	Terminus
Location
- Location within Madrid

Príncipe Pío ([ˈpɾinθipe ˈpi.o], formerly Estación del Norte) is a multimodal train station in Madrid, Spain that services Madrid Metro's Line 6, Line 10, and Ramal; Cercanías Madrid's commuter rail lines C-1, C-7, and C-10; and city buses and intercity and long-distance coaches. It is located next to the River Manzanares between the San Vicente roundabout and the streets of Cuesta de San Vicente, Paseo de la Florida, and Paseo del Rey in the district of Moncloa-Aravaca. It is one of the busiest stations in the Madrid Metro and Cercanías systems.

Príncipe Pío's train station has three levels. The highest level, which is used by Cercanías trains, is elevated and has an island platform. The middle level, which is used by Madrid Metro Lines 6 and 10, is partially underground and has a dual-island platform with four tracks arranged to facilitate cross-platform transfers. The lowest level, which is used by Madrid Metro Ramal trains, is underground and uses two side platforms. An underground bus terminal is located next to the train station. Additionally, the station houses a shopping center and a theater.

== History ==
=== Estación del Norte (1861–1993) ===
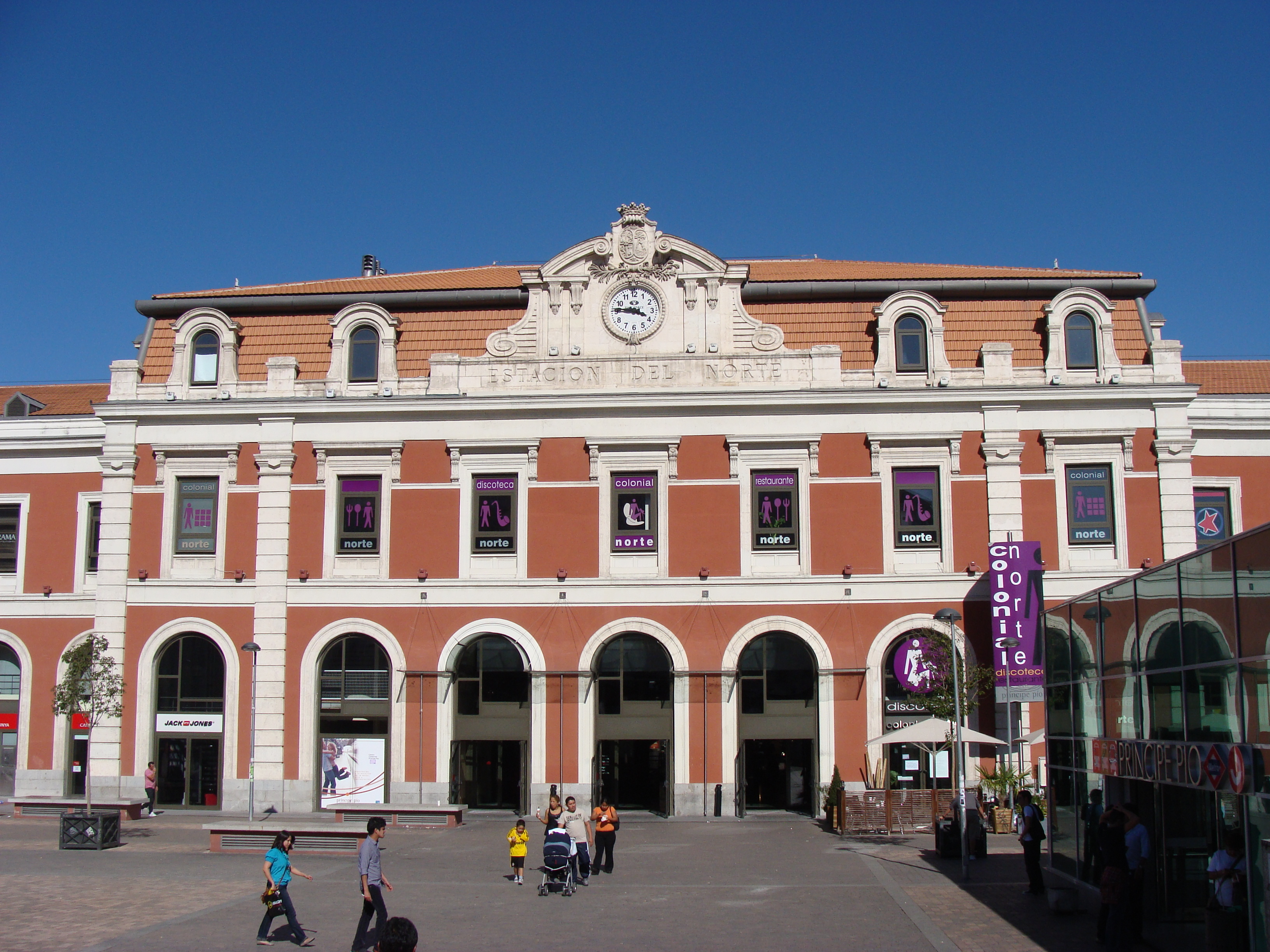
1882 passenger hall

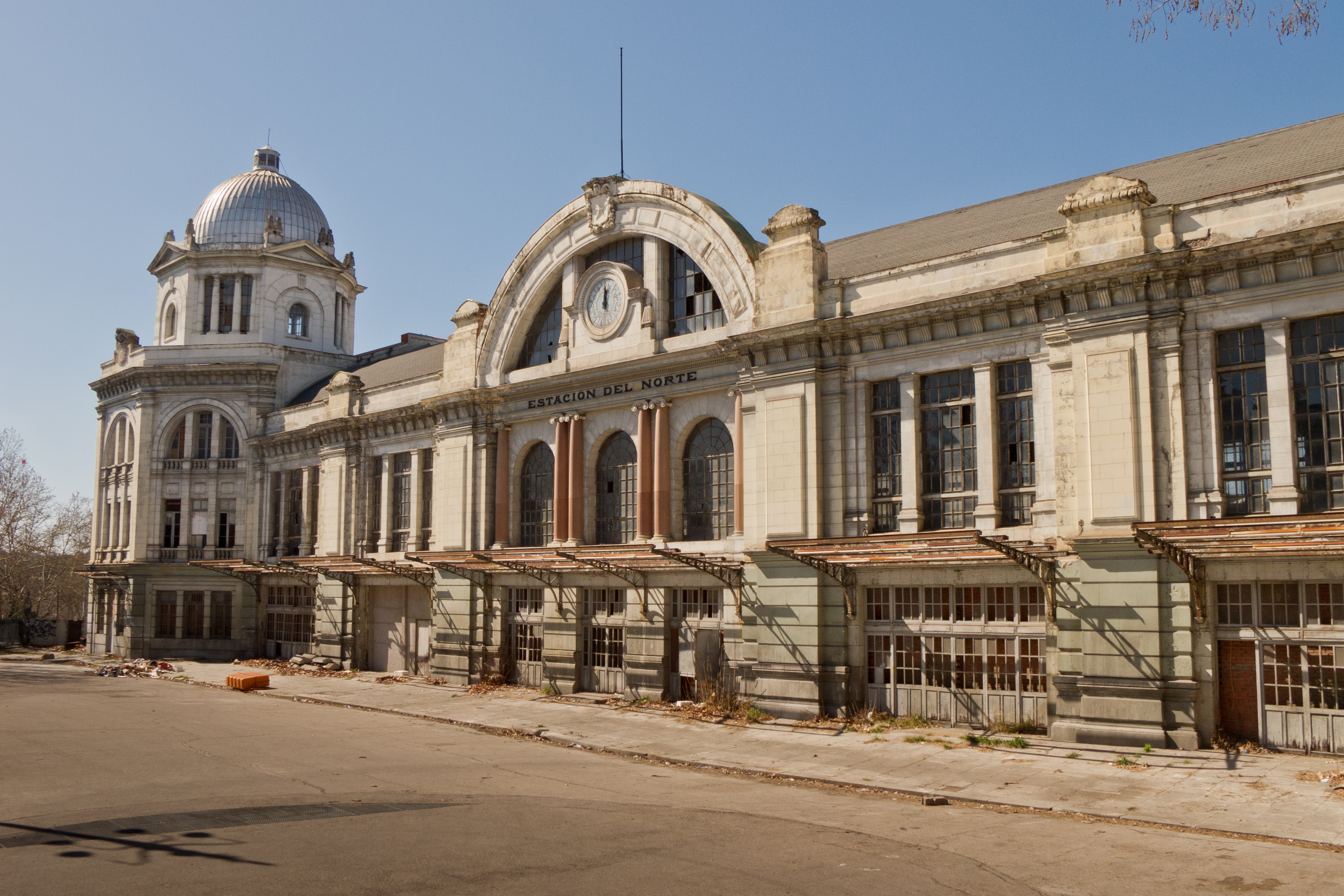
1928 passenger hall before recent renovations

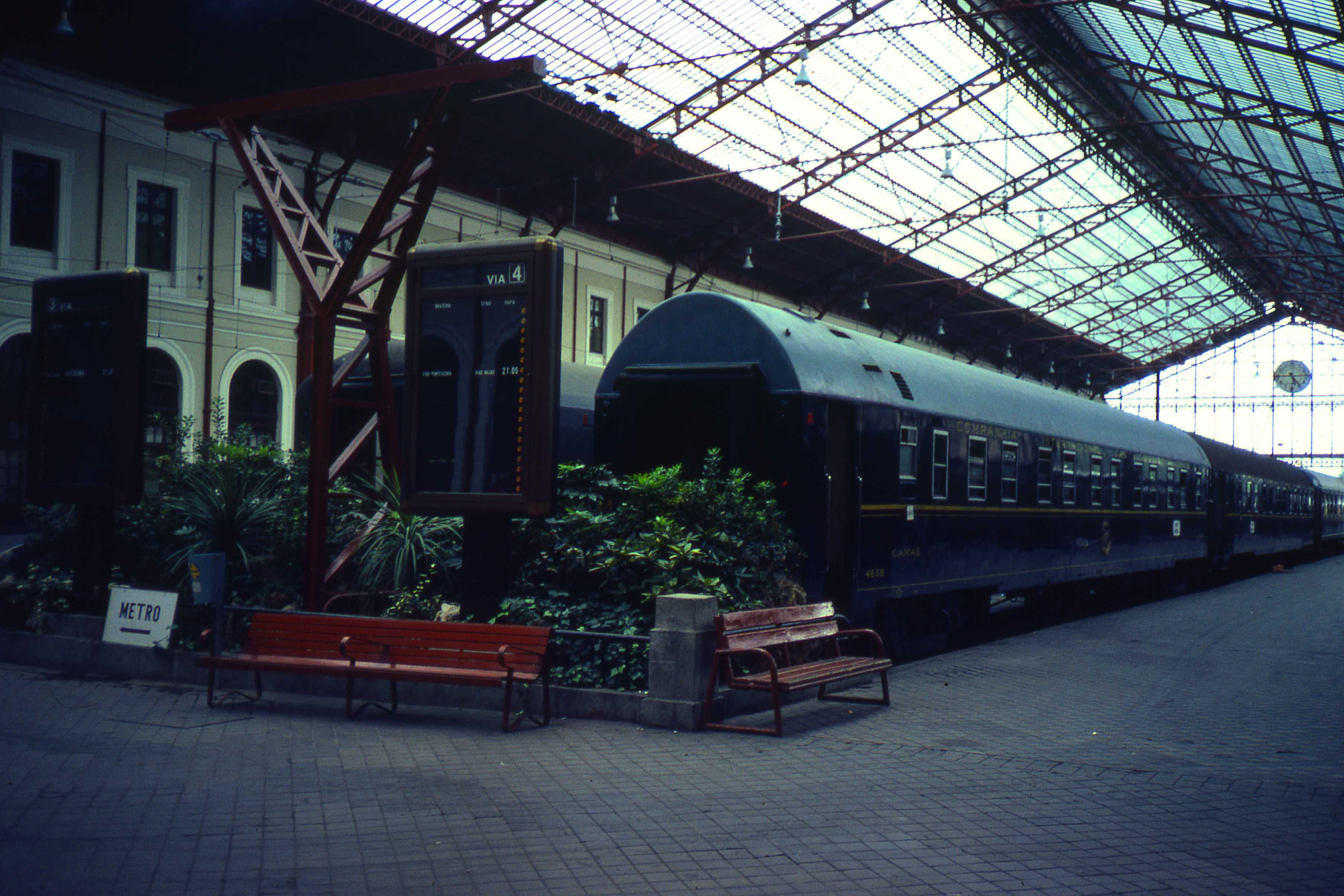
Interior of the trainshed in 1981

==== Construction ====
Príncipe Pío station was originally known as the Estación del Norte (North Station), which was built as the Madrid terminus for the Compañía de los Caminos de Hierro del Norte de España (Railway Company of Northern Spain). The company operated a line northward to Irun on the French border, where passengers could continue on to the rest of Europe. Work began on the Madrid-Irun line in 1856, and work began on the station in 1859. Around the same time, surface-level tracks were built to connect the Estación del Norte with Atocha station. The Madrid-Irun line was built by French engineers, and a nearby railway bridge over the River Manzanares, the Puente de los Franceses (Bridge of the Frenchmen), was named after them. The original station had a simple construction and opened in June 1861, although the line initially only offered service to El Escorial near Madrid.

Due to a lack of space, maintenance facilities were built alongside the track between the station and the Puente de los Franceses. On 16 July 1882, the first of the station's two passenger halls was inaugurated, located parallel to the tracks and facing the Paseo de la Florida. At the end of the tracks, a garden was planted between the station and the Cuesta de San Vicente.

In 1928, a second passenger hall was inaugurated, located at the end of the tracks and facing the Cuesta de San Vicente. After its construction, it was designated for departures, while the 1882 hall was designated for arrivals.

==== Madrid Metro Ramal service ====
The Estación del Norte was located on the banks of the River Manzanares at a lower elevation than the city center, and travelers initially had to climb the steep Cuesta de San Vicente street to get to the city center. In order to solve this difficulty, on 26 December 1925, Madrid Metro opened a branch of its Line 2 between the Estación del Norte and Isabel II station (today Ópera), allowing travelers to take the subway rather than climb the hill. Service between these two stations is now considered a separate line from Line 2 and is known as Ramal (Branch).

==== Post-war years ====
The Estación del Norte was badly damaged during the Spanish Civil War. The war caused severe damage throughout the Spanish railway system, and the Compañía de los Caminos de Hierro del Norte and other railroads went bankrupt. Because of this, the government had to rescue the rail network, creating a state rail agency, the Red Nacional de los Ferrocarriles Españoles (National Network of Spanish Railways) or RENFE. In those years, the Estación del Norte became the second busiest railway station in Madrid after Atocha with service to northwestern Spain, Castile and León, and Portugal.

==== Decline in use ====
The station declined in importance in the 1960s and 1970s. In 1967, the Chamartín station was built north of the city. The station served as the terminus for a new direct line to Burgos that offered a shorter trip to Irun and the French border than the older route through Valladolid. The same year, the so-called Túnel de la Risa ("Tunnel of Laughter") opened, connecting Atocha and Chamartín stations and allowing trains to pass underneath the city center. The new tunnel bypassed the Estación del Norte. Little by little, rail lines were moved to Chamartín, and by 1976 the only remaining non-Metro trains were the Cercanías commuter rail lines. However, in 1979, the Estación del Norte recovered some rail service when it became a terminus for express trains to Galicia.

Between 1985 and 1992, Atocha was closed for renovations, and trains from southern Spain and the Mediterranean coast were rerouted to Chamartín via the Túnel de la Risa. To avoid overcrowding at Chamartín, some of the lines to Galicia, Asturias, and Cantabria were rerouted to the Estación del Norte.

=== Príncipe Pío station (1995) ===
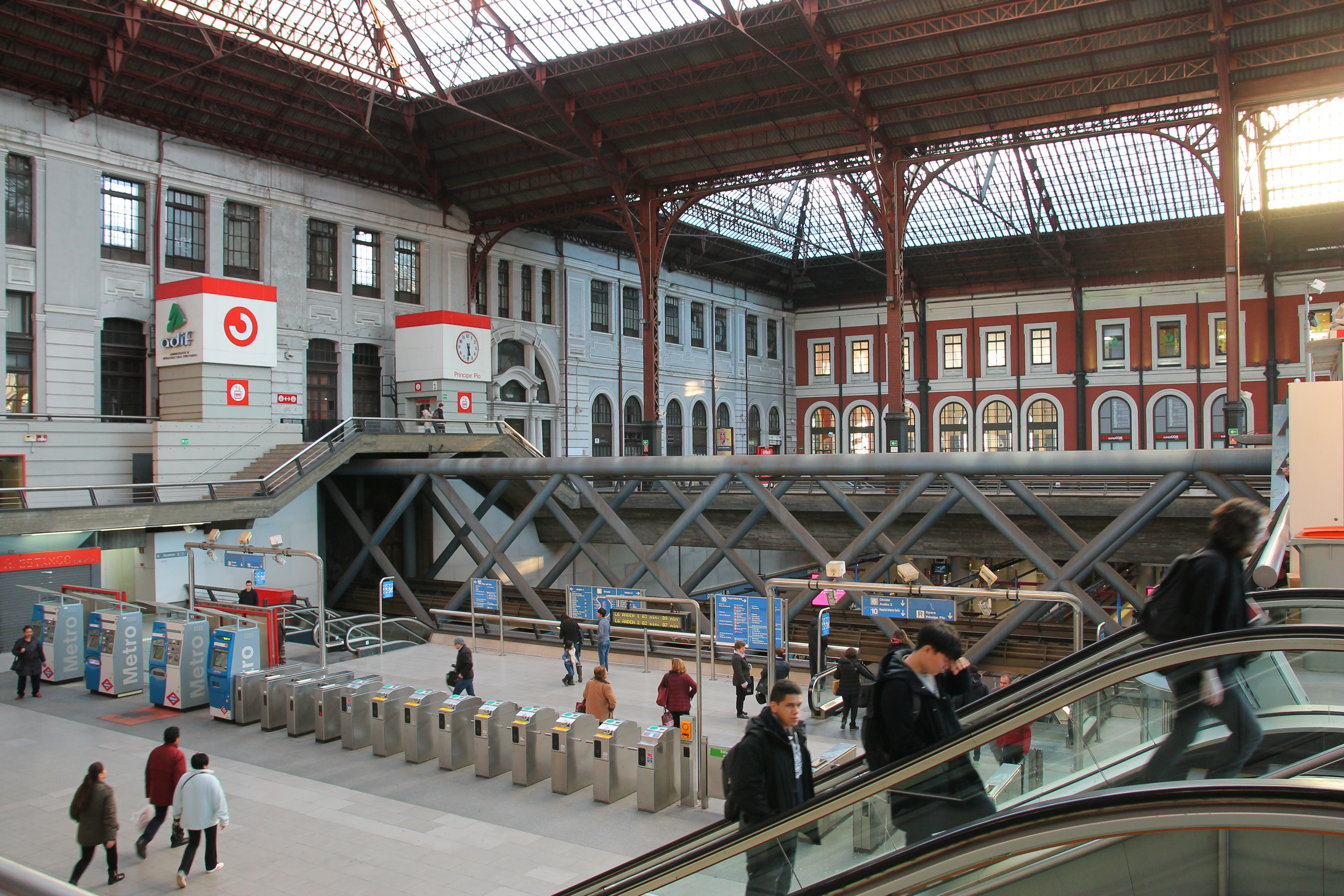
Interior of Príncipe Pío station

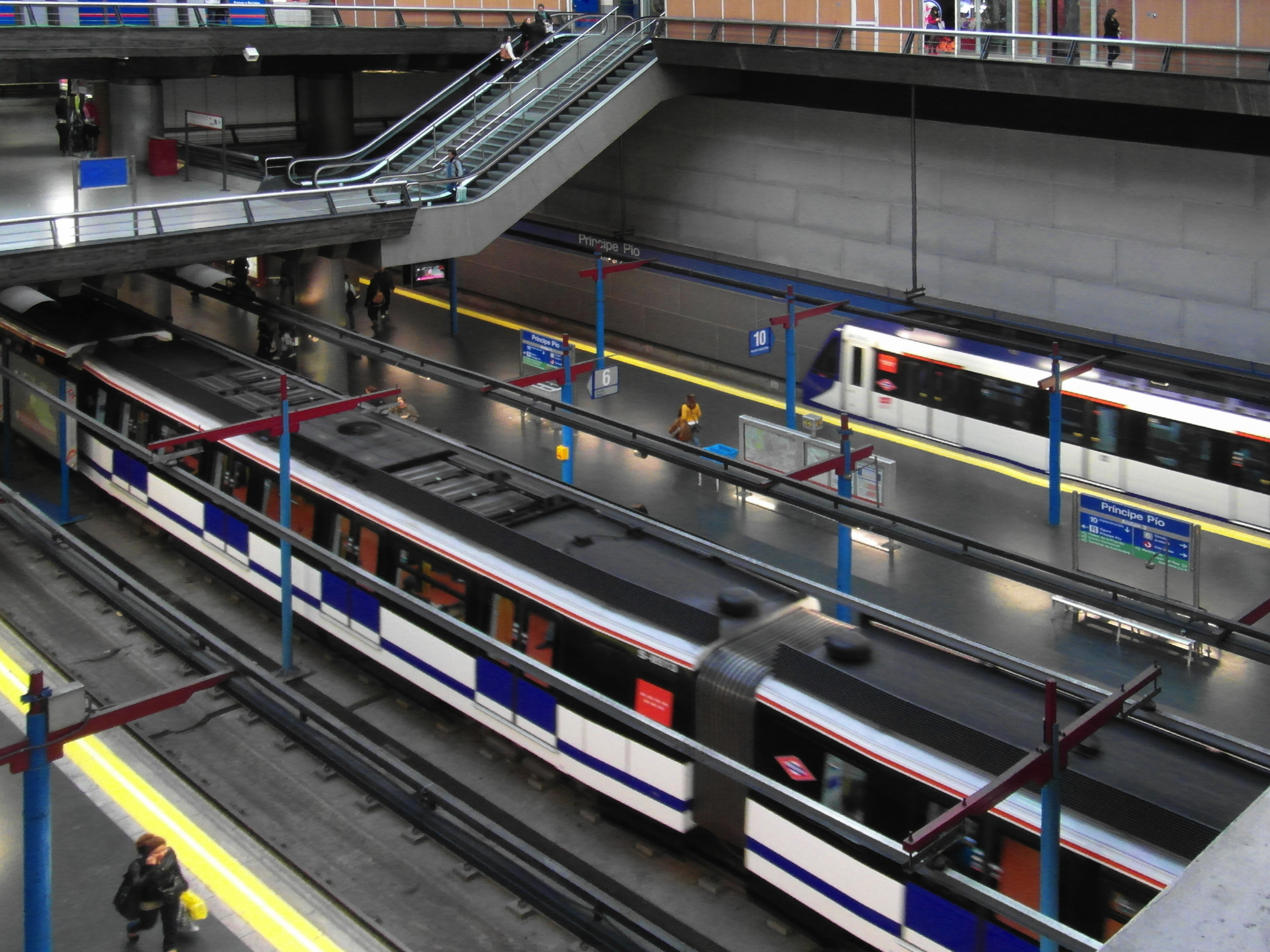
Line 6 and 10 platforms

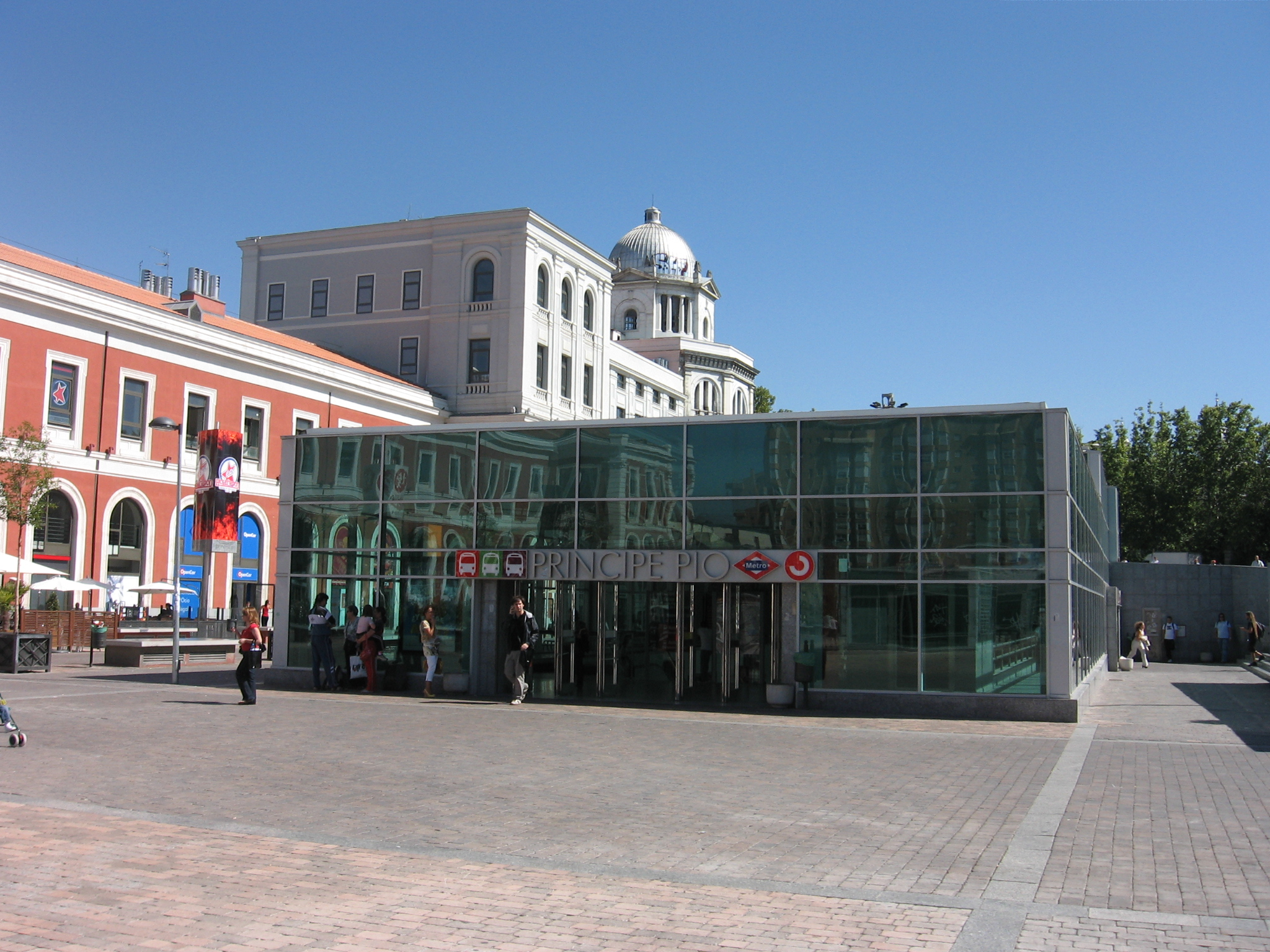
Bus station headhouse

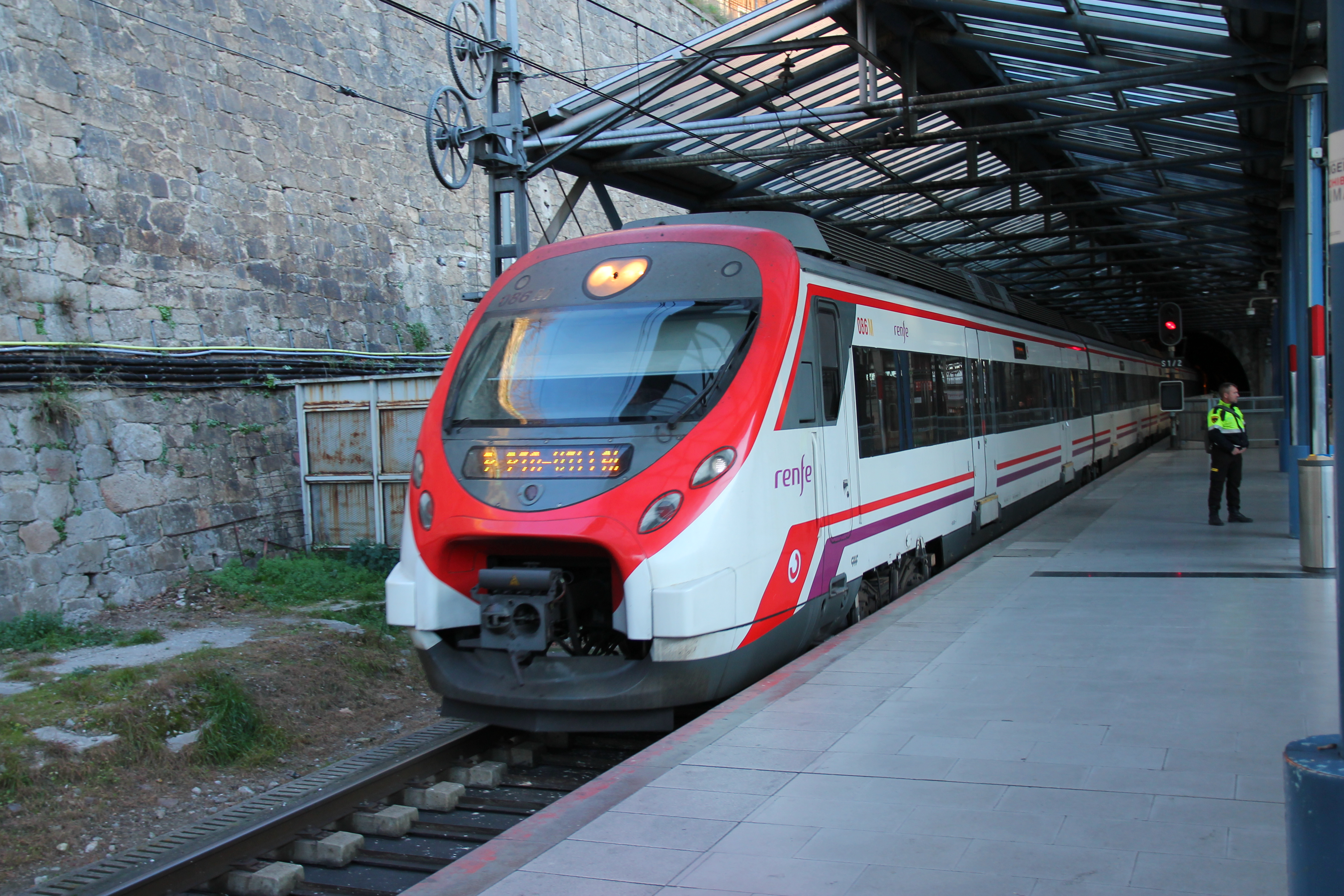
Cercanías train at Príncipe Pío

==== Renovations ====
On 30 January 1993, the last long-distance train departed the Estación del Norte, and it closed for an extensive renovation planned by engineer Javier Bustinduy. These renovations changed the station's layout completely in order to turn it into a major intermodal station for the Metro and Cercanías. The floor underneath the trainshed was excavated, opening a partially underground space for Madrid Metro Lines 6 and 10. At the same time, the track layout was modified to accommodate Cercanías commuter rail services. The renovated station was renamed Príncipe Pío station after the nearby Príncipe Pío hill, which in turn was named for its former owner, Italian nobleman Francesco Pio di Savoia.

The renovation coincided with the Pasillo Verde Ferroviario (Green Rail Corridor) project, which was intended to improve the Cercanías ring route around Madrid. The project replaced a neglected surface rail line with a tunnel between the Estación del Norte and Delicias station. The former rail corridor was then converted into green space and commercial and residential areas. The new tunnel allowed Cercanías trains from the northwest to stop at Príncipe Pío and then continue to Atocha.

On 10 May 1995, Príncipe Pío's Line 6 platforms were inaugurated. The opening coincided with the completion of the Metro segment between Laguna and Ciudad Universitaria, which converted Line 6 into a circular route. Cercanías service began the following year on 30 June 1996, and the Line 10 platforms were opened on 26 December 1996. When Line 10 was first built in 1961, its tracks passed under Príncipe Pío but did not stop there, so the Line 10 platforms are an infill station. The Line 6 and 10 tracks were designed to facilitate cross-platform transfers. They consist of four parallel tracks on the same level. Line 6 uses the inner two tracks and Line 10 uses the outer two tracks, simplifying transfers between the two lines.

==== Bus terminal ====
Príncipe Pío's location near the M-30 and A-5 highways and local routes made it a major stop for intercity buses. At first, a surface bus station was built between the 1882 passenger hall and the Paseo de la Florida. In the mid-2000s, a multi-level underground bus station was built with greater capacity and direct connection to the M-30 and A-5 highways. The new bus terminal was built under the Paseo de la Florida and opened on 8 May 2007.

==== Shopping center and theater ====
Much of the station's interior space went unused until 2000, when the old trainshed and the 1882 passenger hall were converted into a shopping center. Additional space was provided by a new building on land previously occupied by the railyard, and the shopping center was inaugurated on 22 October 2004.

In 2018, the 1928 passenger hall was converted into a theater and entertainment complex known as Gran Teatro Bankia Príncipe Pío.
