= Madrid–Barcelona railway =

Major Spanish train link

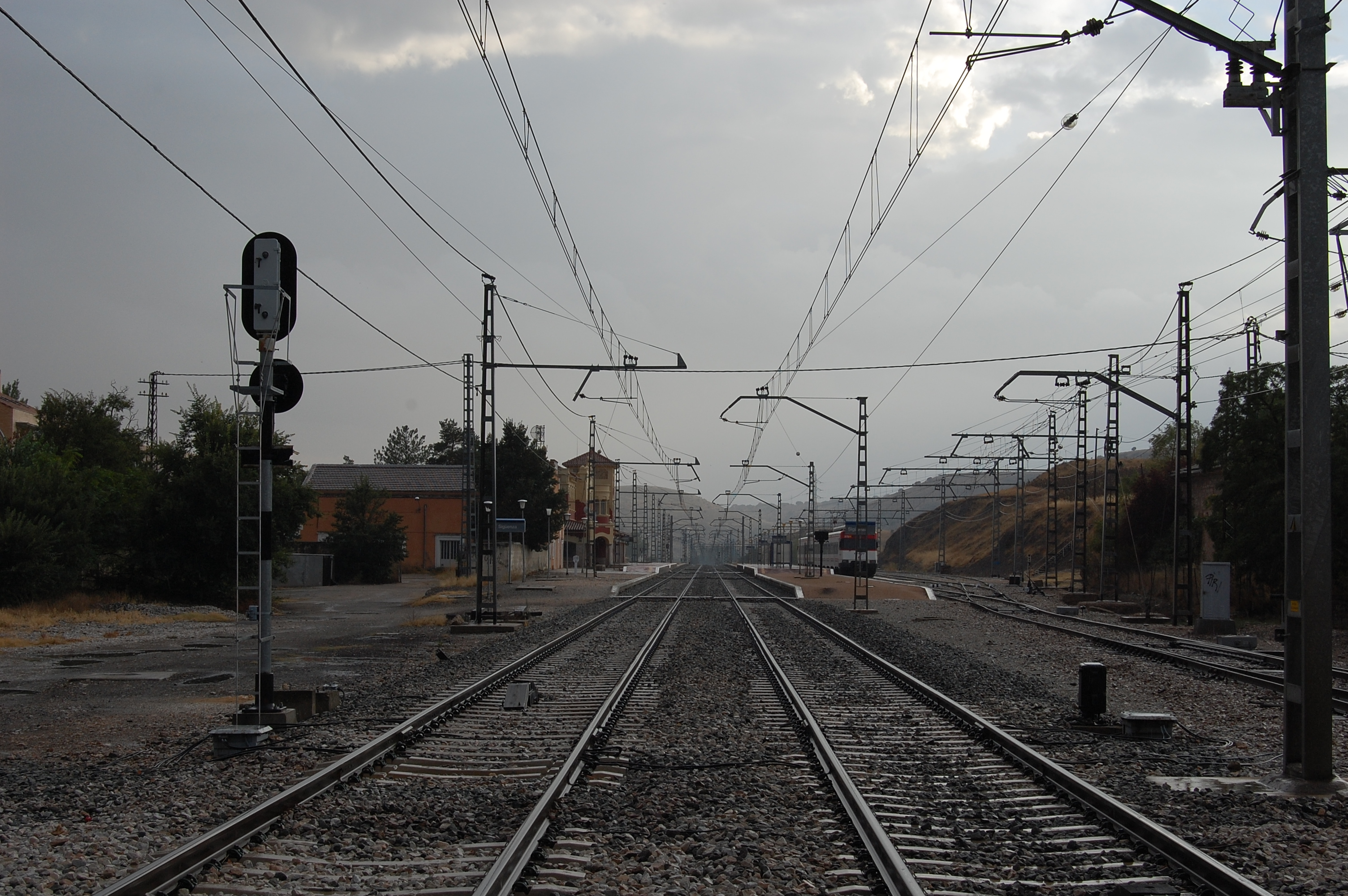
- Madrid–Barcelona railway

Overview
- Status: Operational
- Owner: Adif
- Termini: Madrid Chamartín; Barcelona França railway station

Service
- Operator(s): Renfe Operadora

History
- Opened: 2 June 1859

Technical
- Line length: 699.7 km (434.8 mi)
- Track gauge: 1,668 mm (5 ft 5 21/32 in) Iberian gauge
- Operating speed: 160 km/h (99 mph)

The Madrid–Barcelona railway is the conventional railway line linking the Spanish capital Madrid with the country's second largest city of Barcelona, Catalonia. It now primarily serves local commuter rail services and regional traffic since the opening of the Madrid–Barcelona high-speed rail line in 2008, prior to which only 1.98 million annual passengers travelled between the two cities.

== Route ==
The line serves important Spanish cities including Guadalajara, Zaragoza, Lleida, Reus and Tarragona. At Casetas the line forms a junction with the Casetas–Bilbao railway. Prior to the high-speed railway opening, journeys between Madrid and Barcelona on this railway took up to seven hours.

== Services ==
The line is used by Cercanías Madrid services C-2 and C-7, C-1 of Cercanías Zaragoza, and Rodalies de Catalunya's R2 line; along with numerous regional services along various stretches of the line. The Regional Express service runs the full distance between Madrid and Barcelona, taking 9 hours and 24 minutes; since the opening of the AVE high-speed rail line travel has been reduced to 2 hours and 30 minutes non-stop, freeing up the older slower line for other traffic.
