= Civia =

2003 CAF/Siemens commuter train class

Civia 462, 463, 464 and 465
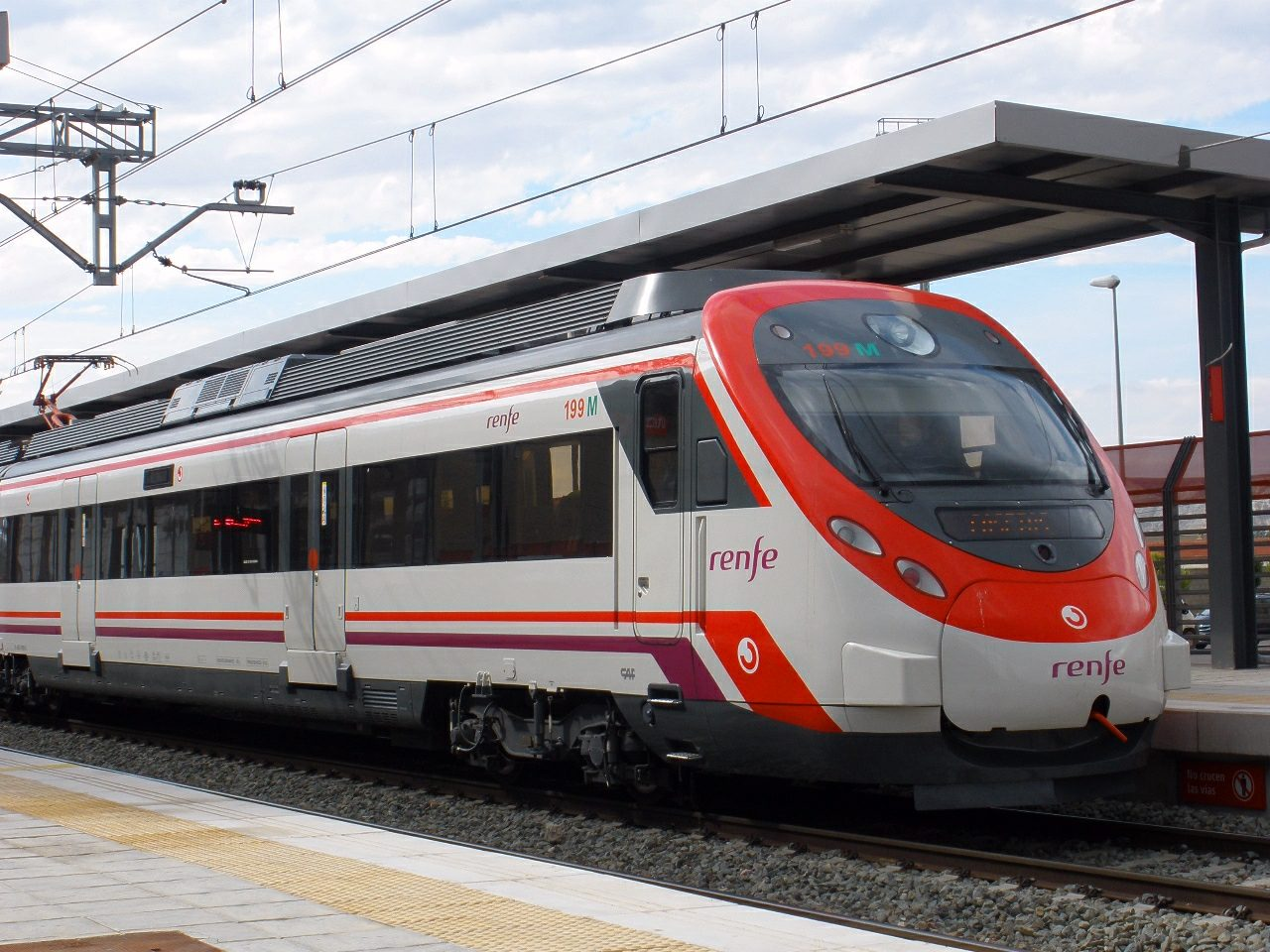
- Civia 463 EMU at Utebo operating under Cercanías Zaragoza.

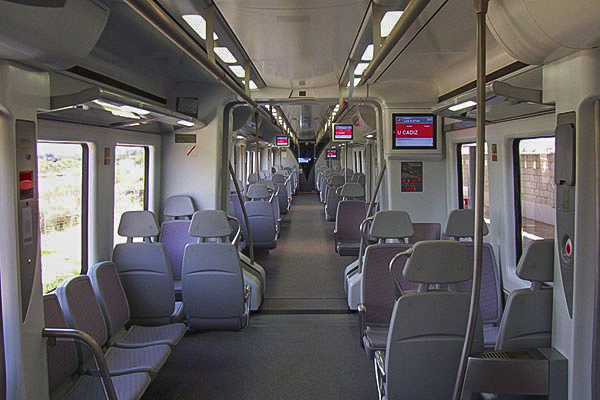
- The interior of a Civia train of Cercanías Cádiz.
- In service: 2003–present
- Manufacturers: CAF and Siemens
- Constructed: 2002–2003, 2004–2010
- Entered service: 2003
- Formation: 462: A1–A2 (2-car); 463: A1–A3–A2 (3-car); 464: A1–A4–A3–A2 (4-car); 465: A1–A4–A3–A5–A2 (5-car)
- Capacity: 462: 414 (124 seated); 463: 607 (169 seated); 464: 832 (223 seated); 465: 997 (277 seated)
- Operator: Renfe (2003–2005, 2007–present)

Specifications
- Car length: 22,788 mm (74 ft 9.2 in) (end cars); 17,643 mm (57 ft 10.6 in) (intermediate cars)
- Width: 2,940 mm (9 ft 7.75 in)
- Height: 4,265 mm (13 ft 11.91 in)
- Doors: 4 per car
- Maximum speed: 120 km/h (75 mph)
- Weight: 462: 80 t (78.7 long tons; 88.2 short tons); 463: 105.8 t (104.1 long tons; 116.6 short tons); 464: 131.5 t (129.4 long tons; 145.0 short tons); 465: 157.3 t (154.8 long tons; 173.4 short tons)
- Power output: 462: 1,270 kW (1,703.1 hp); 463: 1,400 kW (1,877.4 hp); 464: 2,100 kW (2,816.1 hp); 465: 2,200 kW (2,950.2 hp)
- Electric system: 3 kV DC (nominal) from overhead catenary
- Current collection: Pantograph
- Safety systems: ASFA, ASFA Digital, ERTMS
- Track gauge: 1,668 mm (5 ft 5 21/32 in) Iberian gauge

Civia is a class of electric multiple unit trains built by CAF and Siemens for the Renfe Cercanías commuter railway networks in Spain. The first units entered service in 2003.

The Civia train concept was created with passenger comfort and build quality in mind, and to meet the goals of reliability, frequency and punctuality. They have better provision for disabled passengers than older Cercanías trains.

== Technical details ==
Civia units use 3kV DC overhead electrification. The maximum speed of Civia units in service is 120 km/h (75 mph), but with modifications they will be able to reach 160 km/h (99 mph).

=== Modularity ===
Civias are modular units - trains can be formed from two, three, four or five cars as required. Renfe classifies various Civia configurations as Classes 462, 463, 464 and 465; or collectively as Classes 46*. There are four car types:

- A1 - end car with driving cab and normal floor.
- A2 - end car with driving cab and normal floor.
- A3 - intermediate car and downstairs WC.
- A4 - intermediate car with normal floor.

== Cities and routes ==
Civia units operate in the following cities and regions:

- Asturias
- Cádiz
- Catalonia
- Madrid
- Málaga
- Santander
- Seville
- Valencia
- Zaragoza

== Accident ==
On 28 July 2017, Class 465 unit 210M collided with a buffer stop at Barcelona França station, causing 54 injuries of which 5 were serious.

== Gallery ==
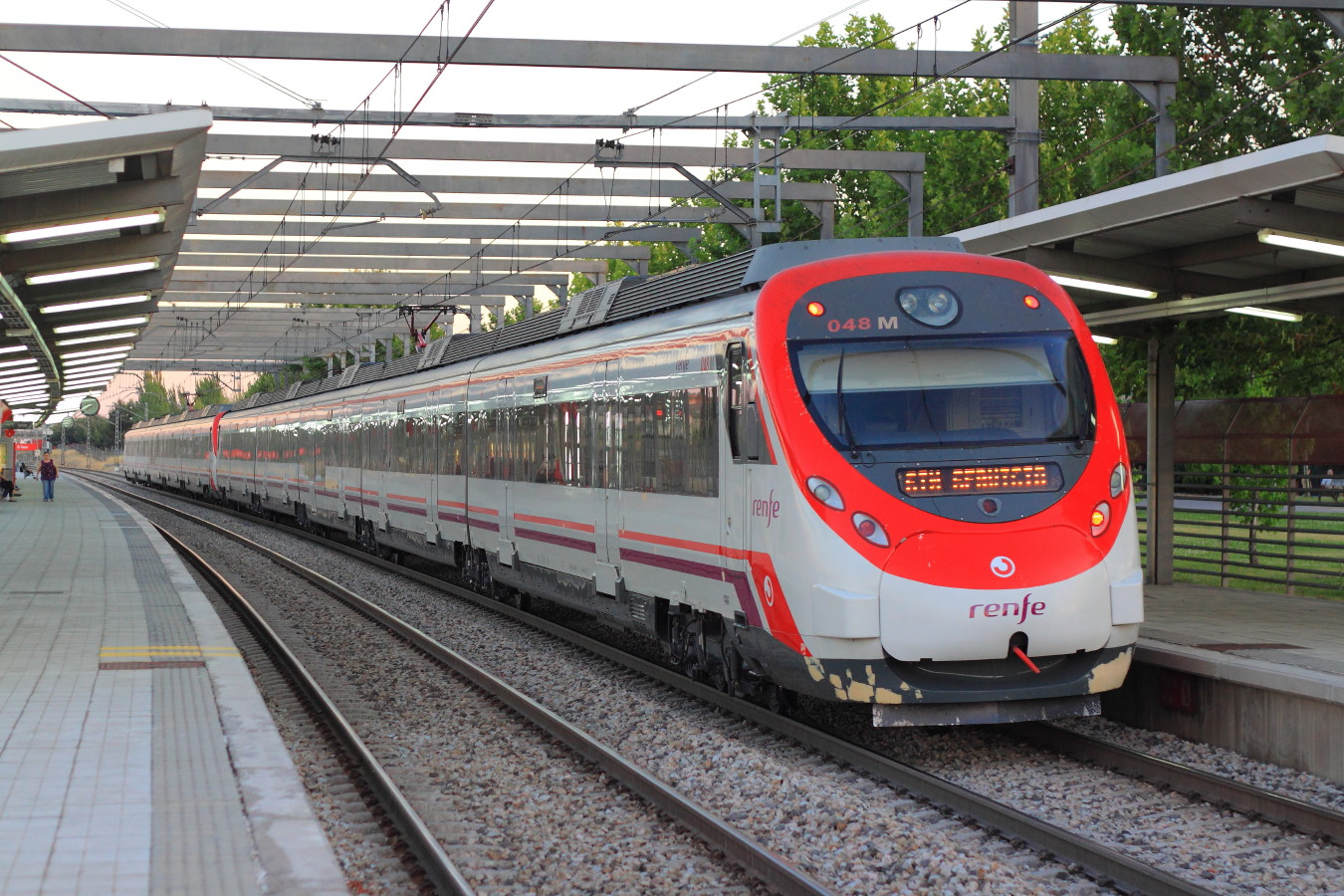
Civia 465 in El Casar, Getafe near Madrid

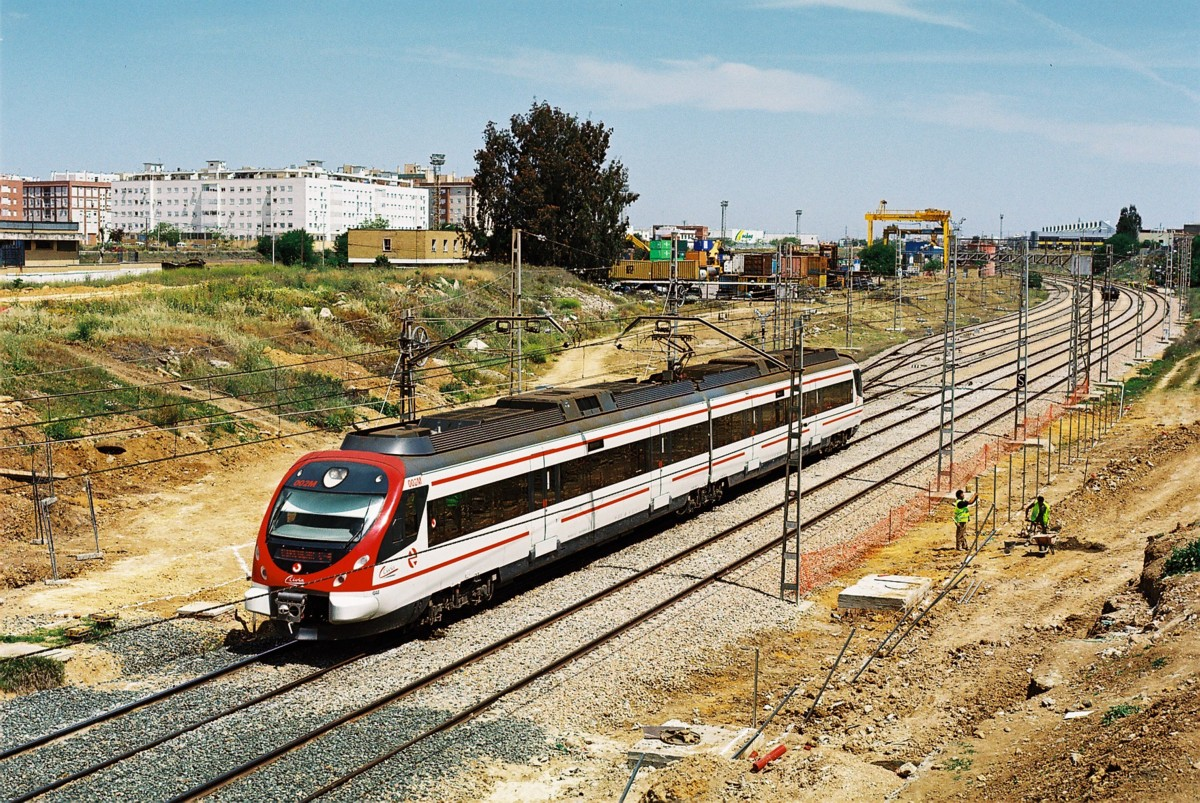
A rare Civia 462 near Padre Pío-Palmete, Seville

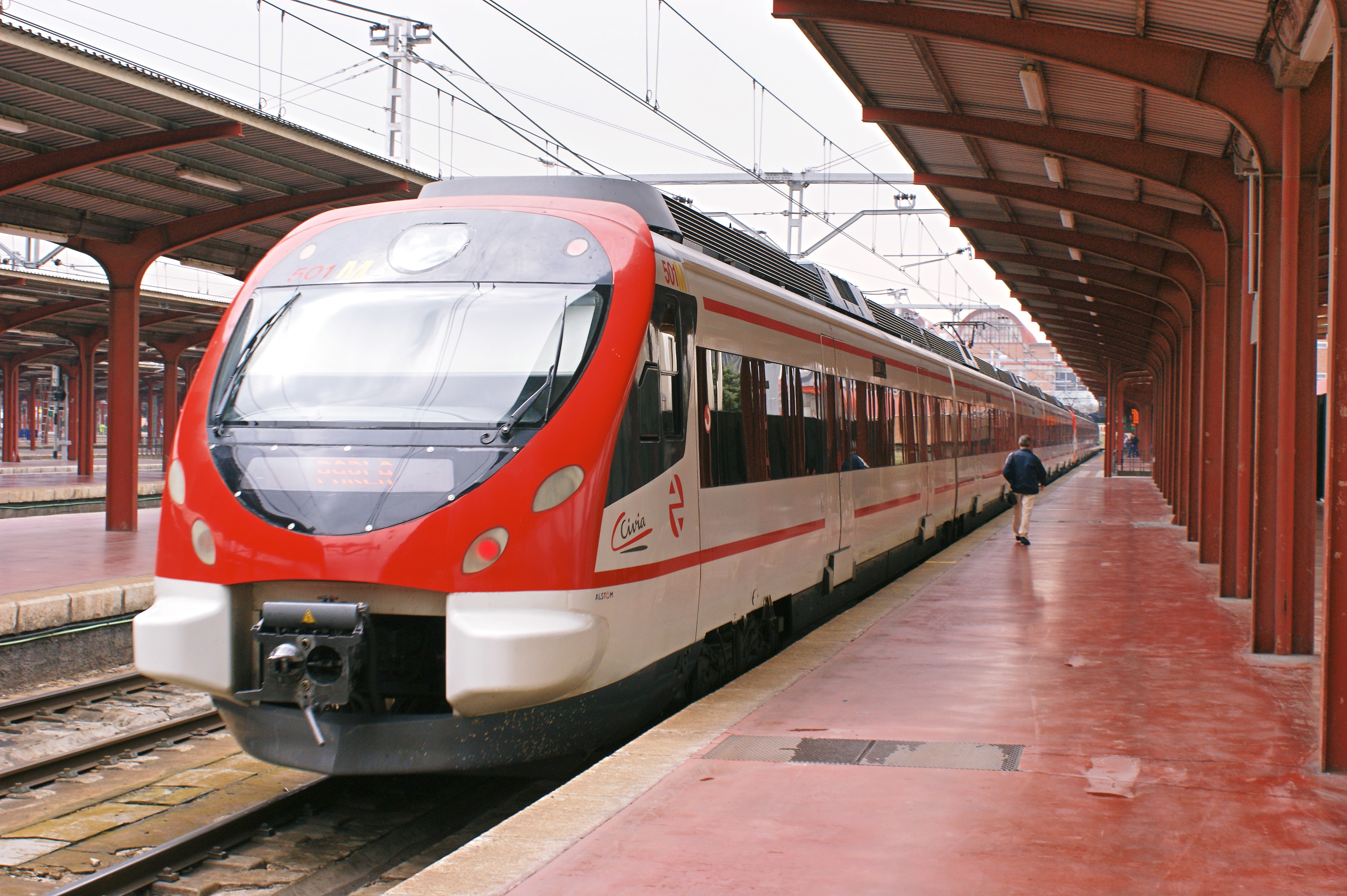
Civia 465 on its original livery in Chamartín station, Madrid

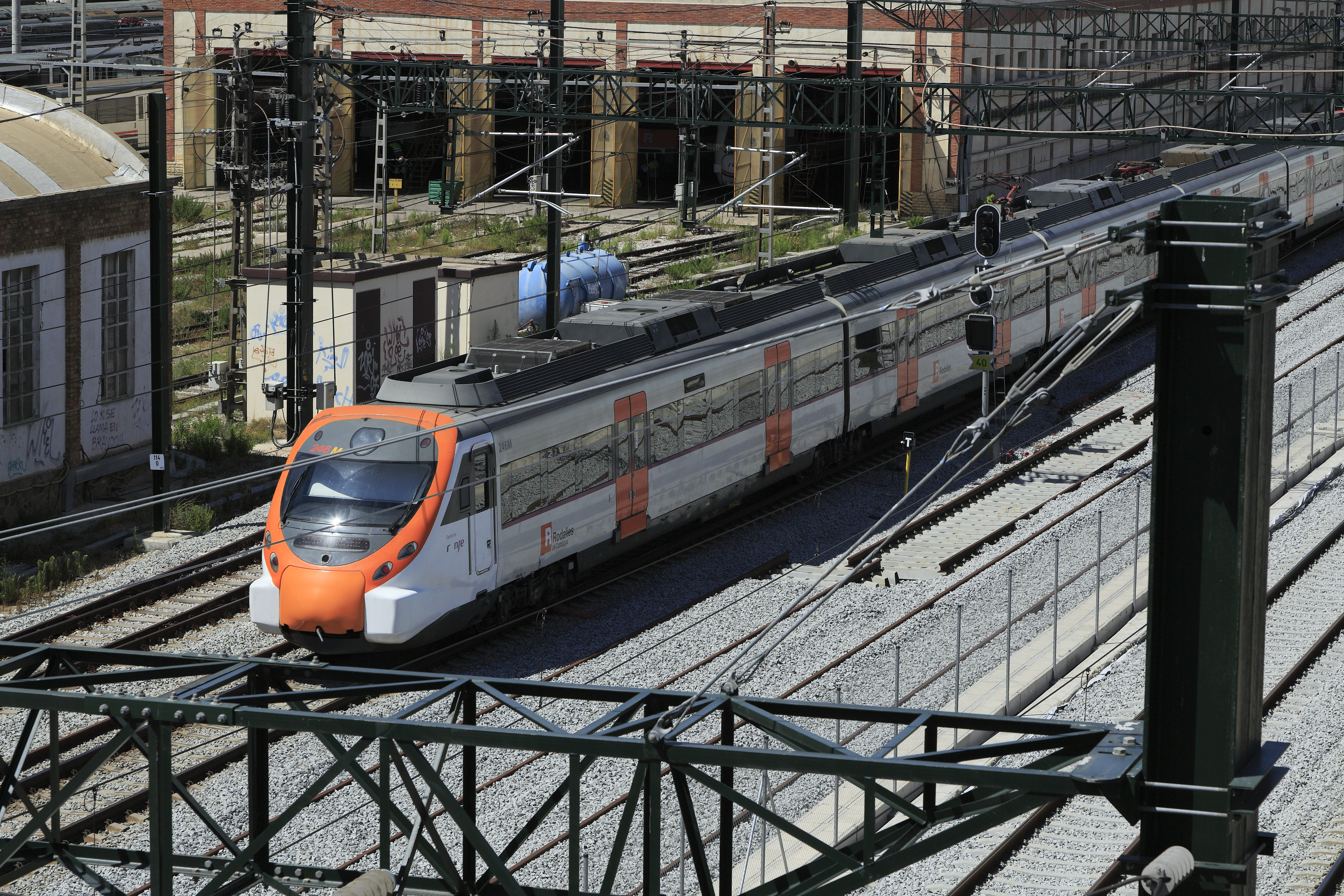
Civia 465 with the Rodalies de Catalunya livery near Sant Andreu Comtal, Barcelona

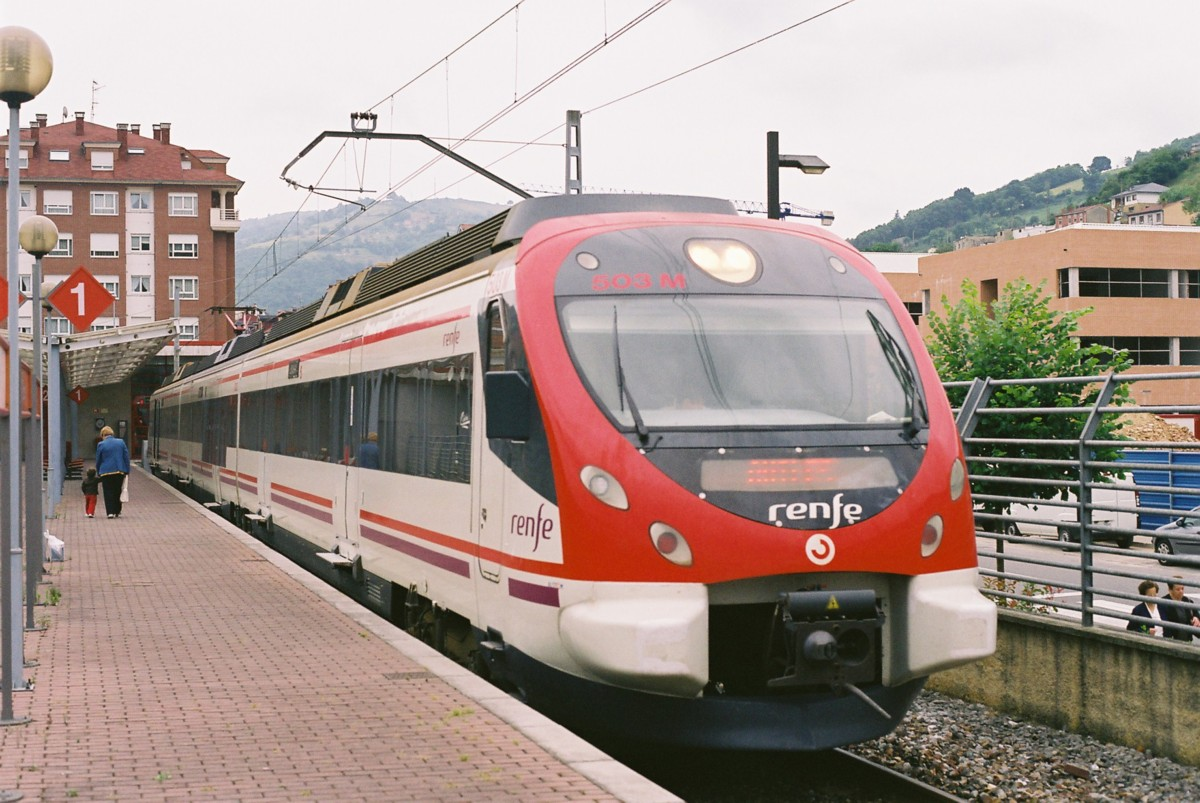
Civia 463 in El Entrego, Asturias

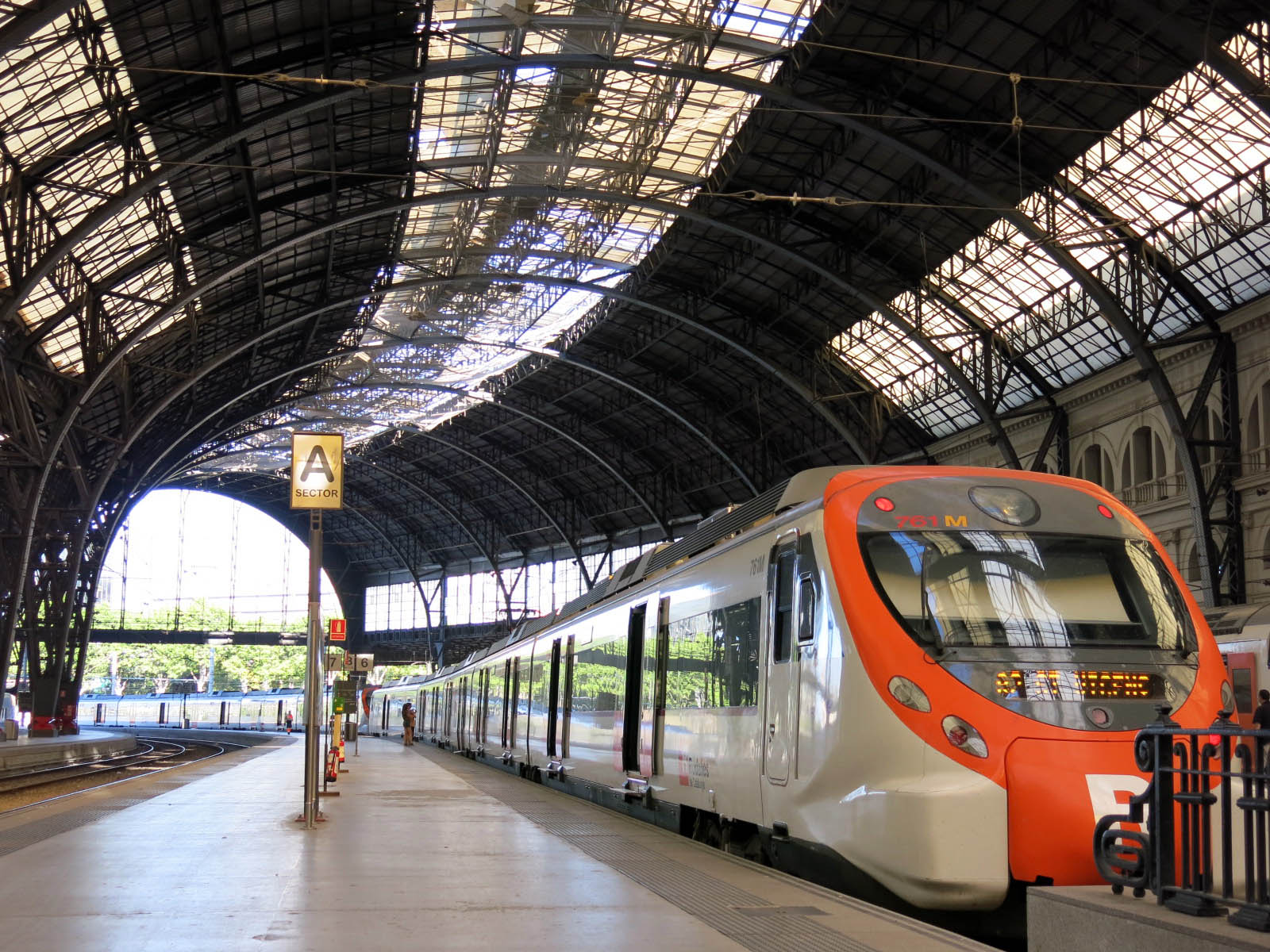
A Civia 465 with the Rodalies de Catalunya livery at Barcelona Estació de França

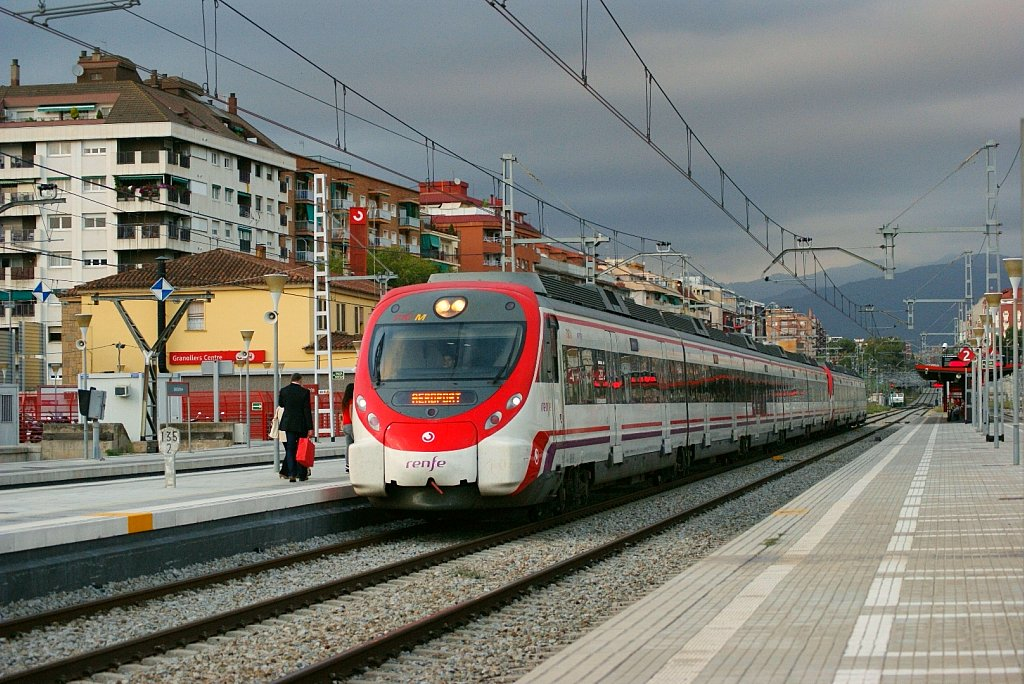
Coupled Civias 465 and 463 at Granollers Centre, Barcelona

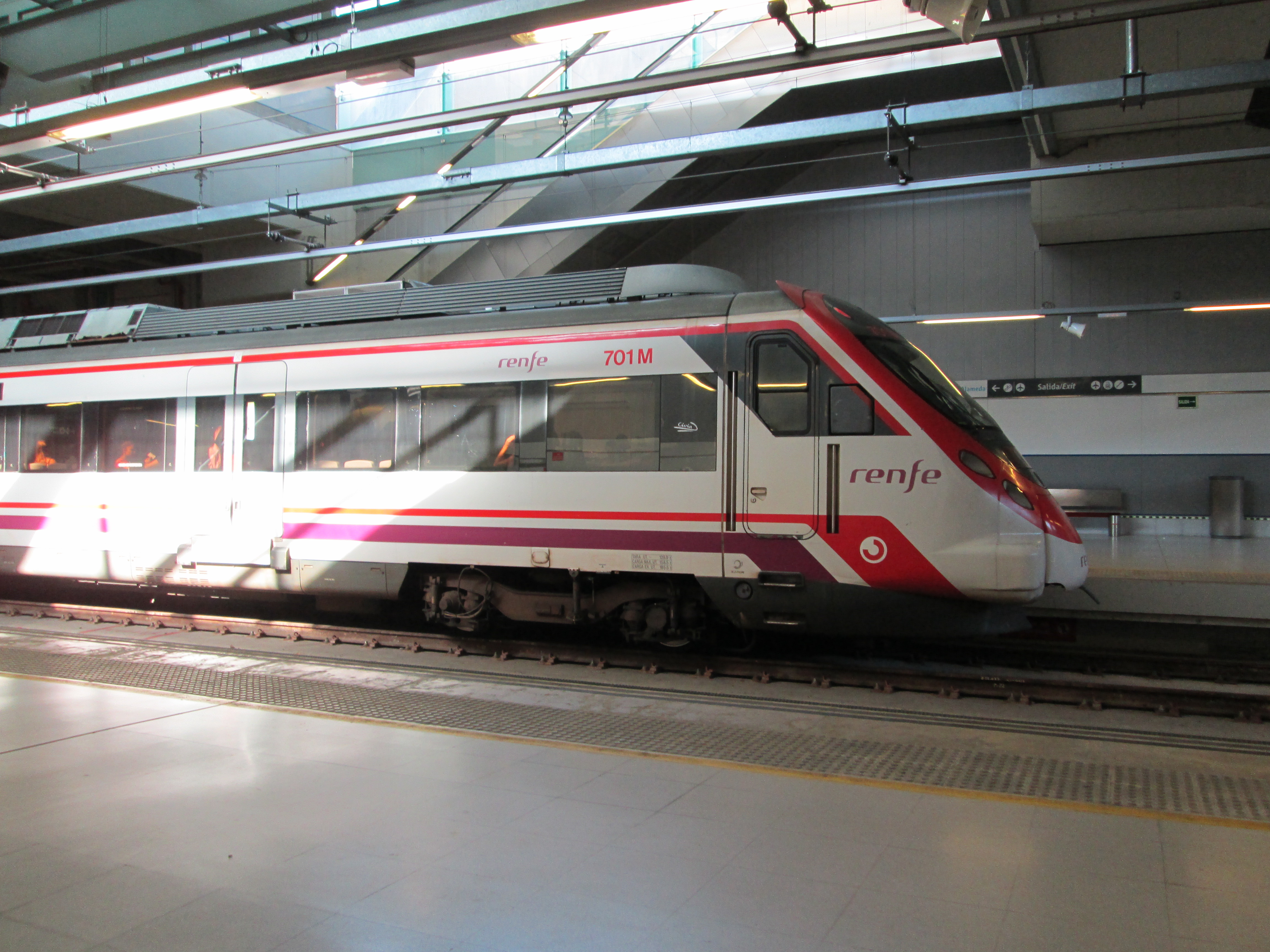
A Civia 464 in Málaga Airport

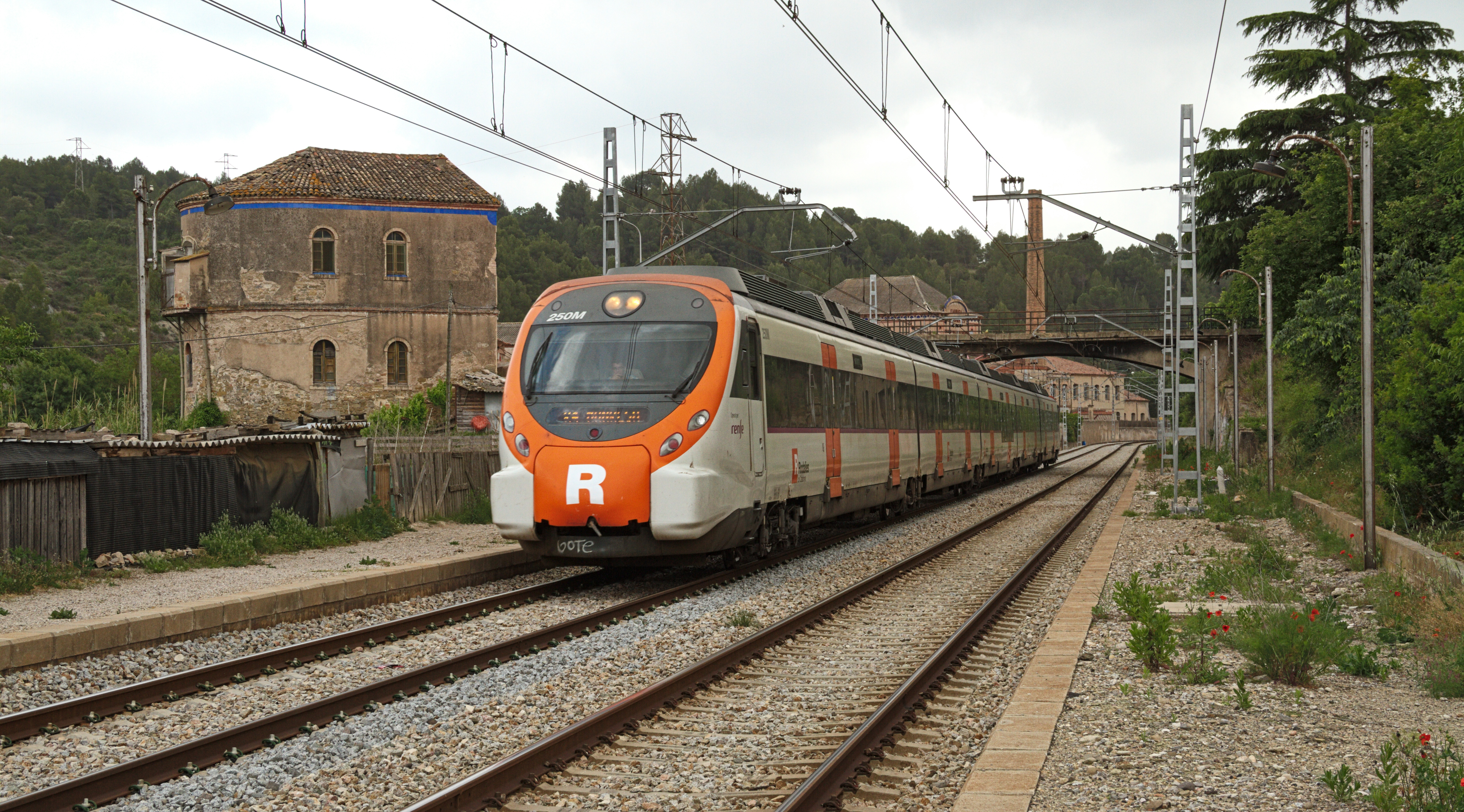
A Civia 465 with the Rodalies de Catalunya livery in Els Comtals, Catalonia

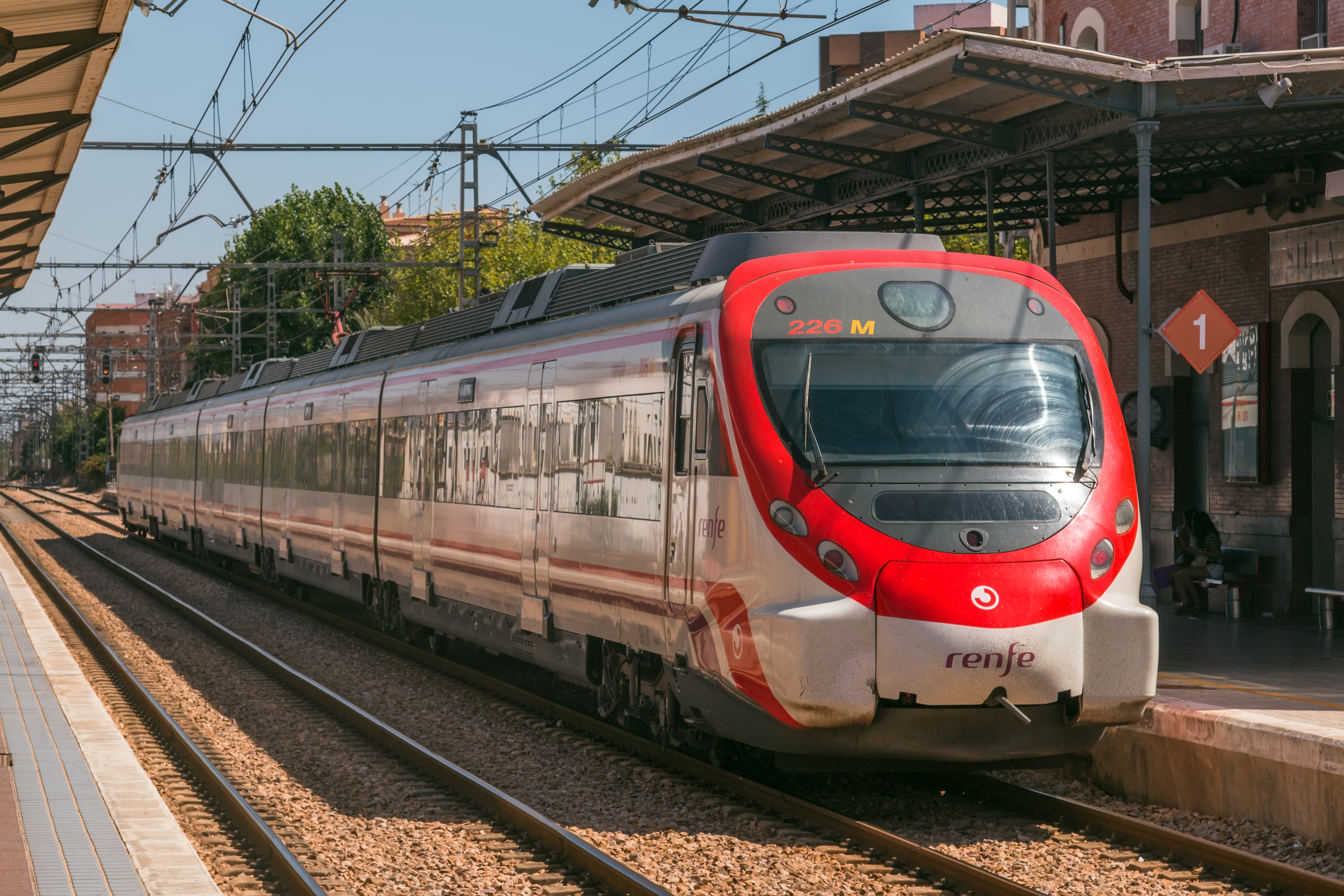
A Civia 465 in Silla, Valencia

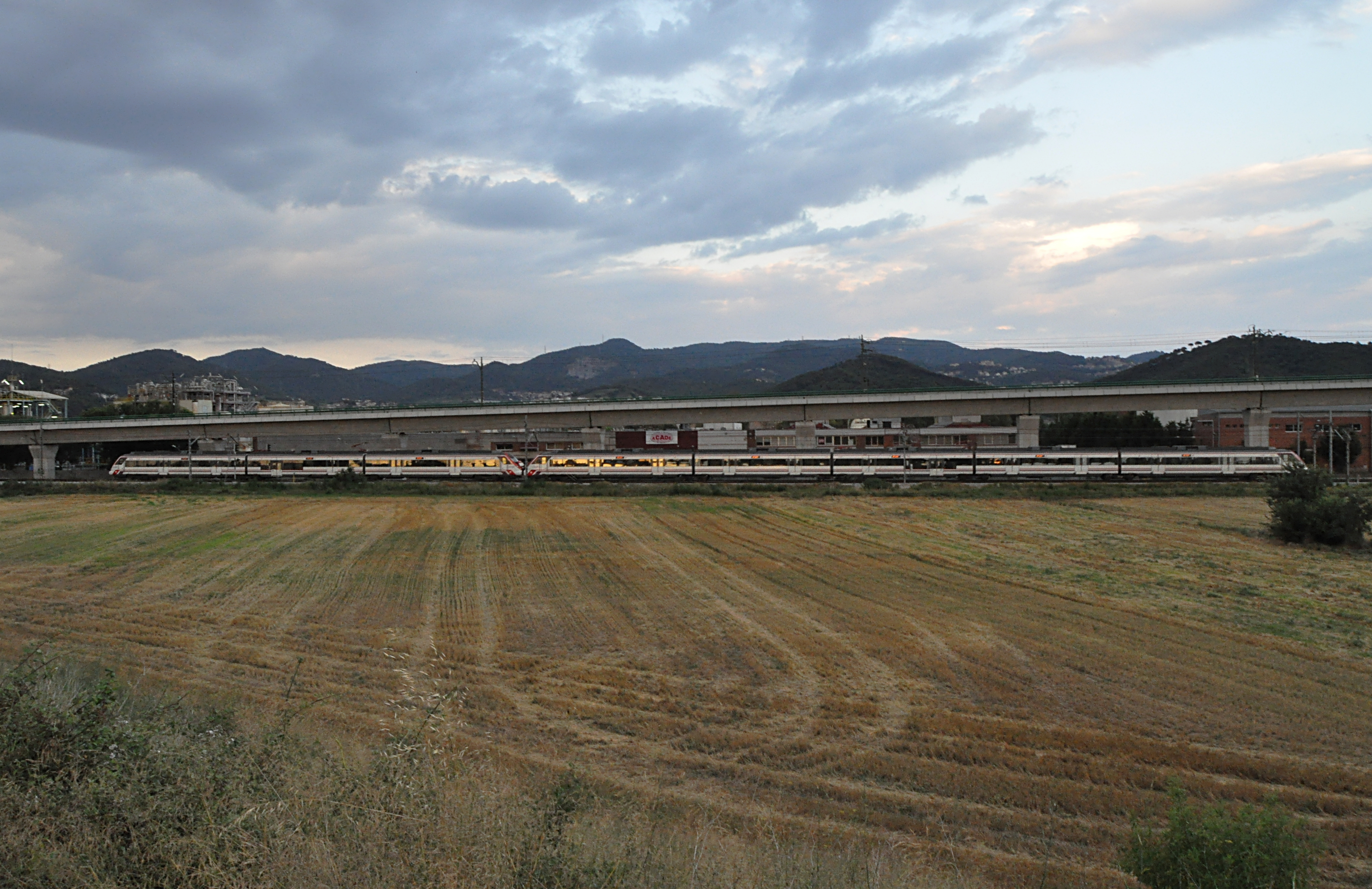
A Civia 465+463 near Mollet - Sant Fost train station (Catalonia).

== Scheme ==
Schematic diagram of a five-car (465) Civia unit.

== See also ==
- X'Trapolis Modular – Alstom commuter train design similar to the Civia, used mainly in Chile
- Ivolga (train)
- DBAG Class 422
- DBAG Class 423
- DBAG Class 424
- Cercanías
- Renfe
