= List of Cercanías Madrid stations =

This is a complete list of the railway stations served by Cercanías Madrid services.

== Stations ==
#	Terminal of a service
*	Transfer station to other transport systems
#*	Transfer station and terminal

Station	Railway line(s)	Served by	Transfers	Location	
Station	Railway line(s)	Served by	Transfers	Municipality	Zone
Aeropuerto T4 #*	Madrid–Barajas Airport	C-1	Madrid Metro line 8	Madrid	
Alcalá de Henares #	Madrid–Barcelona	C-2, C-7	—	Alcalá de Henares	
Alcalá de Henares Universidad	Madrid–Barcelona	C-2	—	Alcalá de Henares	
Alcobendas-San Sebastián de los Reyes #	Cantoblanco–Alcobendas-San Sebastián de los Reyes	C-4	—	Alcobendas/San Sebastián de los Reyes	
Alcorcón *	Móstoles-Parla	C-5	Madrid Metro line 12 at Alcorcón Central	Alcorcón	
Alpedrete	Villalba–Segovia	C-8	—	Alpedrete	
Aluche *	Móstoles-Parla	C-5	Madrid Metro line 5	Madrid	
Aranjuez #	Madrid–Valencia; Aranjuez−Cuenca−Valencia	C-3	—	Aranjuez	
Aravaca *	Madrid-Príncipe Pío-Pinar de las Rozas	C-7, C-10	Madrid Metro Ligero line ML-2 at Estación de Aravaca	Madrid	
Asamblea de Madrid-Entrevías	Madrid–San Fernando de Henares	C-2, C-7	—	Madrid	
Atocha #*	Madrid–San Fernando de Henares; Madrid-Príncipe Pío-Pinar de las Rozas; Madrid–Valencia; Madrid–Valencia de Alcántara; Móstoles-Parla	C-1, C-2, C-3, C-4, C-5, C-7, C-8, C-10	Renfe Operadora-operated high-speed, long-distance and regional rail services Madrid Metro line 1 at Atocha Renfe station	Madrid	
Azuqueca	Madrid–Barcelona	C-2	—	Azuqueca de Henares	
Cantoblanco Universidad	Madrid–Burgos; Cantoblanco–Alcobendas-San Sebastián de los Reyes	C-4	—	Madrid	
Cercedilla #	Villalba–Segovia; Cercedilla–Cotos	C-8, C-9	—	Cercedilla	
Chamartín #*	Madrid–Barcelona; Madrid–Burgos; Madrid–Hendaye	C-1, C-2, C-3, C-4, C-7, C-8, C-10	Renfe Operadora-operated high-speed, long-distance and regional rail services Madrid Metro line 1 and 10	Madrid	
Ciempozuelos	Madrid–Valencia	C-3	—	Ciempozuelos	
Collado Mediano	Villalba–Segovia	C-8	—	Collado Mediano	
Colmenar Viejo #	Madrid–Burgos	C-4	—	Colmenar Viejo	
Coslada *	Madrid–San Fernando de Henares	C-2, C-7	Madrid Metro line 7 at Coslada Central	Coslada	
Cotos #	Cercedilla–Cotos	C-9	—	San Ildefonso, Segovia Province	
Cuatro Vientos *	Madrid–Móstoles-El Soto	C-5	Madrid Metro line 10	Madrid	
Delicias	Madrid-Príncipe Pío-Pinar de las Rozas	C-1, C-7, C-10	—	Madrid	
Doce de Octubre	Móstoles-Parla	C-5	—	Madrid	
Embajadores *	Móstoles-Parla	C-5	Madrid Metro line 3, line 5 at Acacias	Madrid	
El Barrial-Centro Comercial Pozuelo	Madrid–Hendaye	C-7, C-10	—	Madrid	
El Casar *	Madrid–Valencia	C-3	Madrid Metro line 12	Getafe	
El Escorial #	Madrid–Hendaye; Villalba–Segovia	C-3	—	El Escorial	
El Goloso	Madrid–Burgos	C-4	—	Madrid	
El Pozo	Madrid–San Fernando de Henares	C-2, C-7	—	Madrid	
Fanjul	Móstoles-Parla	C-5	—	Madrid	
Fuencarral	Madrid–Burgos	C-4	—	Madrid	
Fuenlabrada *	Madrid–Valencia de Alcántara	C-5	Madrid Metro line 12 at Fuenlabrada Central	Fuenlabrada	
Fuente de la Mora #*	Madrid–Barcelona; Madrid–Barajas Airport	C-1, C-7, C-10	Madrid Metro Ligero line ML-1	Madrid	
Galapagar-La Navata	Madrid–Hendaye	C-3, C-8, C-10	—	Galapagar	
Getafe Centro *	Móstoles-Parla	C-4	Madrid Metro line 12 at Getafe Central	Getafe	
Getafe Industrial	Madrid–Valencia	C-3	—	Getafe	
Getafe Sector 3	Móstoles-Parla	C-4	—	Getafe	
Guadalajara #	Madrid–Barcelona	C-2	—	Guadalajara, Castilla-La Mancha	
Humanes #	Madrid–Valencia de Alcántara	C-5	—	Humanes de Madrid	
La Garena	Madrid–Barcelona	C-2, C-7	—	Alcalá de Henares	
La Serna	Madrid–Valencia de Alcántara	C-5	—	Fuenlabrada	
Laguna *	Móstoles-Parla	C-5	Madrid Metro line 6	Madrid	
Las Águilas	Móstoles-Parla	C-5	—	Madrid	
Las Margaritas Universidad	Móstoles-Parla	C-4	—	Getafe	
Las Matas	Madrid–Hendaye	C-3, C-8, C-10	—	Las Rozas	
Las Retamas	Móstoles-Parla	C-5	—	Alcorcón	
Las Rozas	Madrid-Príncipe Pío-Pinar de las Rozas	C-7, C-10	—	Las Rozas	
Las Zorreras	Madrid–Hendaye	C-3	—	El Escorial	
Leganés *	Madrid–Valencia de Alcántara	C-5	Madrid Metro line 12 at Leganés Central	Leganés	
Los Molinos	Villalba–Segovia	C-8	—	Los Molinos	
Los Negrales	Villalba–Segovia	C-8	—	Los Molinos	
Majadahonda	Madrid–Hendaye	C-7, C-10	—	Alpedrete	
Meco	Madrid–Barcelona	C-2	—	Meco	
Méndez Álvaro *	Madrid-Príncipe Pío-Pinar de las Rozas; Móstoles-Parla	C-1, C-5, C-7, C-10	Madrid Metro line 6	Madrid	
Móstoles *	Móstoles-Parla	C-5	Madrid Metro line 12 at Móstoles Central	Móstoles	
Móstoles-El Soto #	Móstoles-Parla	C-5	—	Móstoles	
Nuevos Ministerios *	Madrid City Tunnel; Madrid–Valencia	C-1, C-2, C-3, C-4, C-7, C-8, C-10	Madrid Metro lines 6, 8 and 10	Madrid	
Orcasitas	Móstoles-Parla	C-5	—	Madrid	
Paco de Lucía *	Madrid–Hendaye	C-3, C-7, C-8	Madrid Metro line 9	Madrid	
Parla #*	Móstoles-Parla	C-4	Parla Tram at Parla Centro-Bulevar Norte	Parla	
Parque Polvoranca	Madrid–Valencia de Alcántara	C-5	—	Leganés	
Pinar	Madrid–Hendaye; Madrid-Príncipe Pío-Pinar de las Rozas	C-3, C-8, C-10	—	Las Rozas	
Pinto	Madrid–Valencia	C-3	—	Pinto	
Pirámides *	Madrid-Príncipe Pío-Pinar de las Rozas	C-1, C-7, C-10	Madrid Metro line 5	Madrid	
Pitis *	Madrid–Hendaye	C-3, C-7, C-8	Madrid Metro line 7	Madrid	
Pozuelo	Madrid-Príncipe Pío-Pinar de las Rozas	C-7, C-10	—	Pozuelo de Alarcón	
Príncipe Pío #*	Madrid-Príncipe Pío-Pinar de las Rozas	C-1, C-7, C-10	Madrid Metro lines 6, 10 and Ramal	Madrid	
Puente Alcocer	Móstoles-Parla	C-5	—	Madrid	
Puerto de Navacerrada	Cercedilla–Cotos	C-9	—	Cercedilla	
Ramón y Cajal	Madrid–Hendaye	C-3, C-7, C-8	—	Madrid	
Recoletos	Madrid City Tunnel	C-1, C-2, C-7, C-8, C-10	—	Madrid	
San Cristóbal de Los Ángeles	Madrid–Valencia	C-3	—	Madrid	
San Cristóbal Industrial	Madrid–Valencia	C-3	—	Madrid	
San Fernando de Henares	Madrid–Barcelona; Madrid–San Fernando de Henares	C-2, C-7	—	Coslada	
San José de Valderas	Móstoles-Parla	C-5	—	Alcorcón	
San Yago	Madrid–Hendaye	C-3	—	Galapagar	
Santa Eugenia	Madrid–San Fernando de Henares	C-2, C-7	—	Madrid	
Soto de Henares	Madrid–Barcelona	C-2, C-7	—	Torrejón de Ardoz	
Sol *	Madrid–Valencia	C-3, C-4	Madrid Metro lines 1, 2 and 3	Madrid	
Torrejón de Ardoz	Madrid–Barcelona	C-2, C-7	—	Torrejón de Ardoz	
Torrelodones	Madrid–Hendaye	C-3, C-8, C-10	—	Torrelodones	
Tres Cantos	Madrid–Burgos	C-4	—	Tres Cantos	
Universidad Pontificia de Comillas	Cantoblanco–Alcobendas-San Sebastián de los Reyes	C-4	—	Madrid	
Valdebebas	Madrid–Barajas Airport	C-1	Madrid Metro line 8	Madrid	
Valdelasfuentes	Cantoblanco–Alcobendas-San Sebastián de los Reyes	C-4	—	Alcobendas	
Valdemoro	Madrid–Valencia	C-3	—	Valdemoro	
Vallecas *	Madrid–San Fernando de Henares	C-2, C-7	Madrid Metro line 1 at Sierra de Guadalupe	Madrid	
Vicálvaro *	Madrid–San Fernando de Henares	C-2, C-7	Madrid Metro line 9 at Puerta de Arganda	Madrid	
Villalba #	Madrid–Hendaye; Villalba–Segovia	C-3, C-8	—	Collado Villalba	
Villaverde Alto *	Madrid–Valencia de Alcántara; Móstoles-Parla	C-4, C-5	Madrid Metro line 3	Madrid	
Villaverde Bajo	Madrid–Valencia; Madrid–Valencia de Alcántara	C-3, C-4	—	Madrid	
Zarzaquemada	Madrid–Valencia de Alcántara	C-5	—	Leganés	
