= Villaverde Bajo railway station =

Railway station in Madrid, Spain

Villaverde Bajo
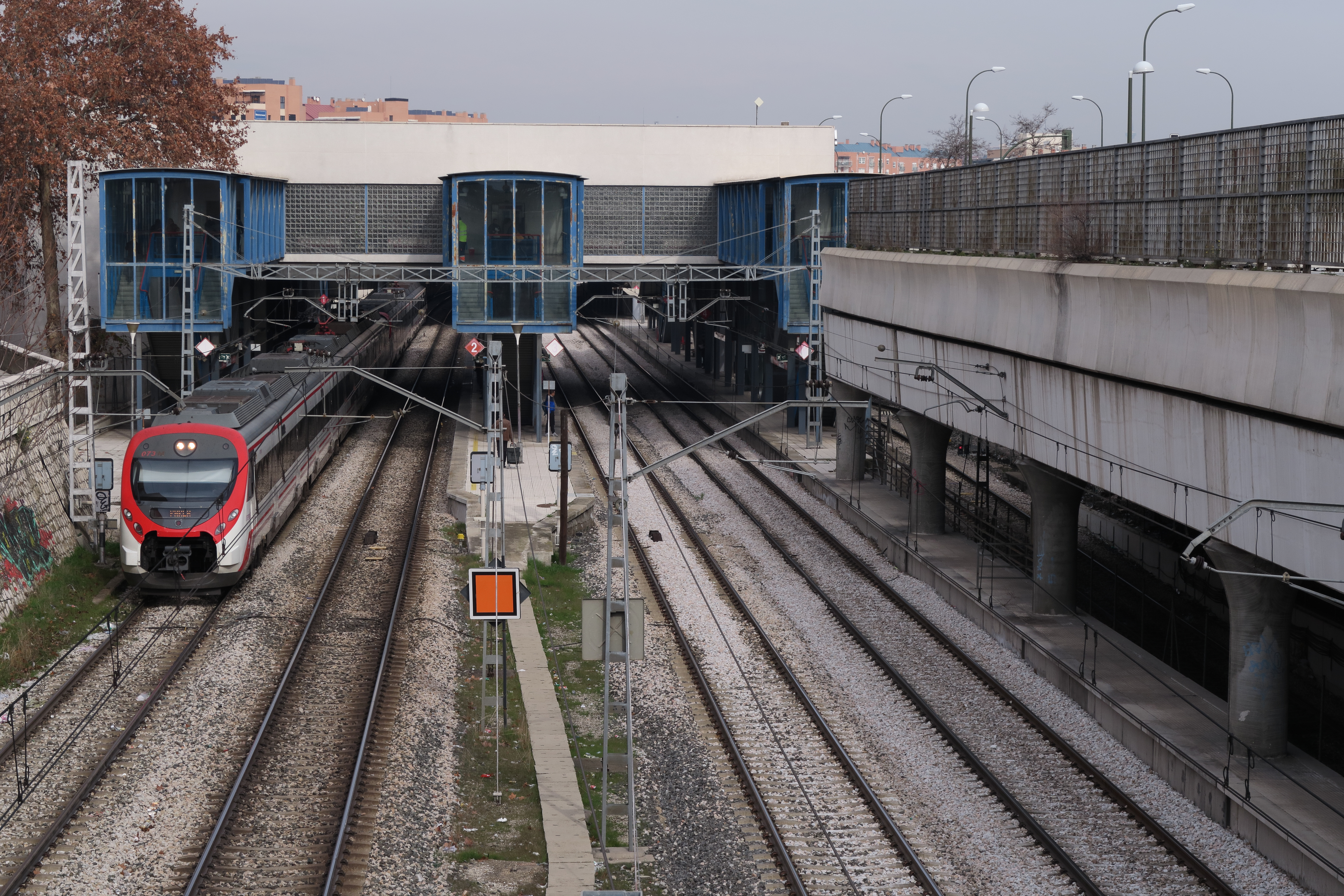

General information
- Location: Villaverde, Madrid
- Coordinates: 40°21′09″N 3°41′02″W
- Owner: Adif
- Operator: Renfe Operadora
- Lines: Madrid–Valencia; Madrid–Valencia de Alcántara

Other information
- Fare zone: A

History
- Opened: 9 February 1851
Location

Villaverde Bajo, is a railway station serving the area of Villaverde in Madrid, Spain. Is owned by Adif and operated by Renfe Operadora. The station is served by Cercanías Madrid line C-3 and C-4.

It should not be confused with the homonymous station of Madrid Metro, as there is no direct access between the two stations.

Preceding station	Renfe Operadora	Following station
Madrid Atocha Terminus	Media Distancia 48	Aranjuez towards Valencia Nord
Preceding station	Cercanías Madrid	Following station
Atocha towards Chamartín	C-3	San Cristóbal de Los Ángeles towards Aranjuez
Atocha towards Alcobendas-San Sebastián de los Reyes or Colmenar Viejo	C-4	Villaverde Alto towards Parla
