= C-4 (Cercanías Madrid) =

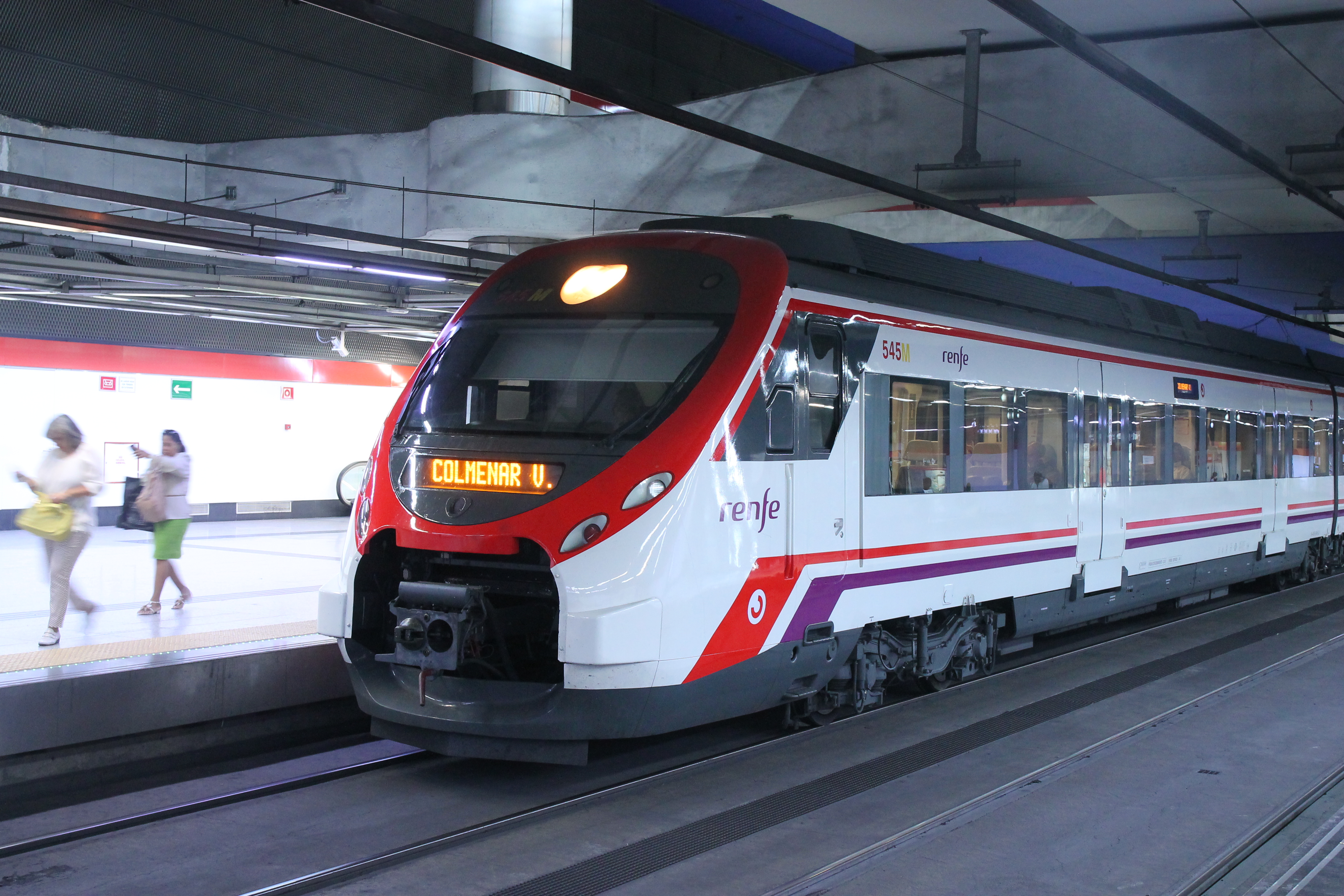
- A Civia train on a C-4 service towards Colmenar Viejo in Nuevos Ministerios station in 2016.

Overview
- Status: Operational
- Owner: Adif
- Locale: Madrid, Community of Madrid, Spain
- Termini: Colmenar Viejo/Alcobendas-San Sebastián de los Reyes; Parla
- Stations: 18

Service
- Type: Commuter rail
- System: Cercanías Madrid
- Services: Madrid-Burgos railway Cantoblanco-Alcobendas railway Madrid–Valencia railway Madrid–Valencia de Alcántara railway Móstoles-Parla railway
- Operator: Renfe Operadora
- Rolling stock: Civia and 446 Series (occasionally) EMUs

History
- Opened: 1981; 45 years ago

Technical
- Line length: 62.2 km (38.6 mi)
- Number of tracks: Double
- Track gauge: 1,668 mm (5 ft 5 21/32 in) Iberian gauge
- Electrification: 3kV DC overhead line

The C-4 is a line and rail service of Cercanías Madrid commuter rail network, operated by Renfe Operadora. It runs from Colmenar Viejo and Alcobendas – San Sebastián de los Reyes north of Madrid to Parla south of Madrid. The C-4 shares tracks for part of its length with Madrid commuter rail service line C-3 through the city of Madrid. The line has been in operation since 1981.

== Infrastructure ==
Like the rest of Cercanías Madrid lines, the C-4 runs on the Iberian gauge mainline railway system, which is owned by Adif, an agency of the Spanish government. All of the railway lines carrying Rodalies de Catalunya services are electrified at 3000 volts V direct current (DC) using overhead lines. The C-4 operates on a total line length of 62.2 kilometres (38.6 mi), which is entirely double-track. The trains on the line call at up to 18 stations, using the following railway lines, in order from north to south:

From	To	Railway line	Route number
Colmenar Viejo (PK 25.9)	Madrid Chamartín (PK 0.0)	Madrid–Burgos	102
Alcobendas–San Sebastián de los Reyes (PK 6.9)	Cantoblanco Universidad (PK 0.0)	Cantoblanco–Alcobendas	104
Madrid Chamartín (PK 0.0)	Villaverde Bajo (PK 7.2)	Madrid–Valencia	300
Villaverde Bajo (PK 7.2)	Villaverde Alto (PK 10.1)	Madrid–Valencia de Alcántara	500
Villaverde Alto (PK 10.1)	Parla (PK 24.6)	Móstoles–Parla	920

== List of stations ==
The following table lists the name of each station served by line C-4 in order from north to south; the station's service pattern offered by C-3 trains; the transfers to other Cercanías Madrid lines; remarkable transfers to other transport systems; the municipality in which each station is located; and the fare zone each station belongs to according to the Madrid Metro fare zone system.

#	Terminal of a service
*	Transfer station to other transport systems
#*	Transfer station and terminal
●	Station served by all trains running through it
○	Limited service station

Station	Service		Cercanías Madrid transfers	Other transfers	Municipality	Fare zone
Station	Colmenar Viejo branch	Alcobendas branch	Cercanías Madrid transfers	Other transfers	Municipality	Fare zone
Colmenar Viejo#	●		—	—	Colmenar Viejo	
Tres Cantos	●		—	—	Tres Cantos	
El Goloso	●		—	—	Madrid	
Alcobendas-San Sebastián de los Reyes#		●	—	—	Alcobendas; San Sebastián de los Reyes	
Valdelasfuentes		●	—	—	Alcobendas	
Universidad Pontificia Comillas		●	—	—	Madrid	
Cantoblanco Universidad	●	●	—	—	Madrid	
Fuencarral	●	●	—	—	Madrid	
Chamartín#*	●	●	C-1, C-2, C-3, C-7, C-8, C-10	Renfe Operadora-operated high-speed and long-distance rail services Madrid Metro lines 1 and 10; National and international coach services	Madrid	
Nuevos Ministerios*	●	●	C-1, C-2, C-3, C-7, C-8, C-10	Madrid Metro lines 6, 8 and 10	Madrid	
Sol*	●	●	C-3	Madrid Metro lines 1, 2 and 3	Madrid	
Atocha*	●	●	C-1, C-2, C-3, C-5, C-7, C-8, C-10	Renfe Operadora-operated high-speed and long-distance rail services Madrid Metro line 1 at Atocha Renfe station National and international coach services	Madrid	
Villaverde Bajo	●	●	C-3	—	Madrid	
Villaverde Alto*	●	●	C-5	Madrid Metro line 3	Madrid	
Las Margaritas Universidad	●	●	—	—	Getafe	
Getafe Centro*	●	●	—	Madrid Metro line 12 at Getafe Central station	Getafe	
Getafe Sector 3	●	●	—	—	Getafe	
Parla#*	●	●	—	Parla Tram	Parla	
