= Alcalá de Henares Universidad railway station =

Railway station in Alcalá de Henares, Spain

Coordinates: 40.5053°N 3.3353°W

Alcalá de Henares Universidad
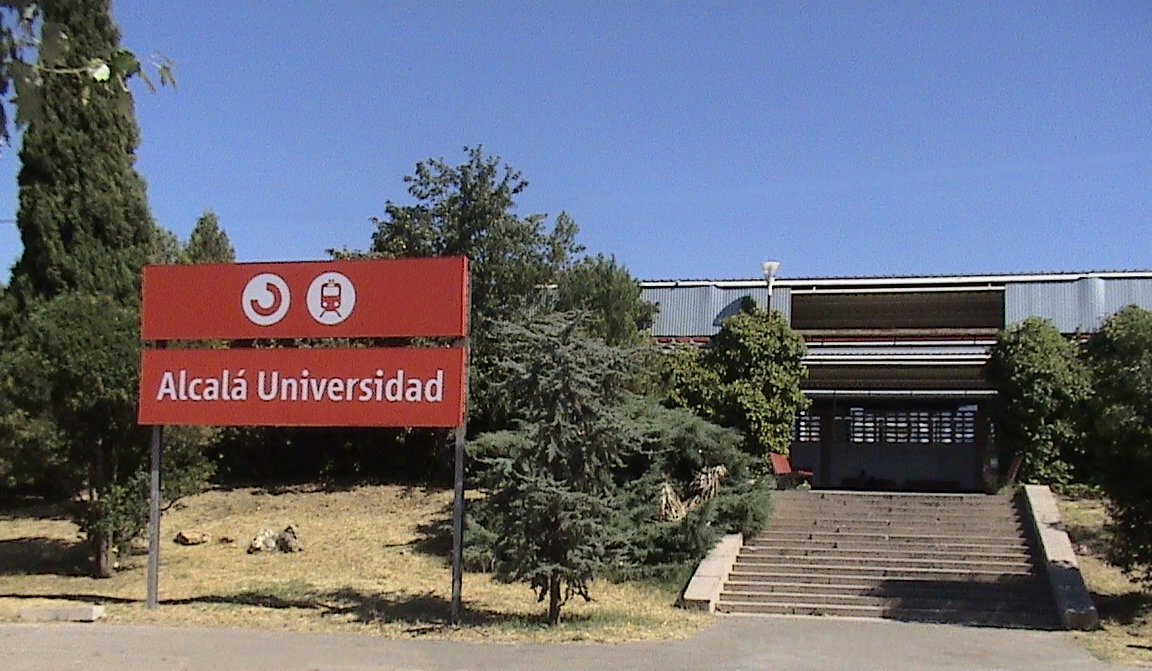
- Main entrance in 2007

General information
- Location: University of Alcalá, Alcalá de Henares, Community of Madrid; Spain
- Owner: Adif
- Operator: Renfe Operadora
- Line: Madrid–Barcelona (PK 36.7)
- Platforms: 2 side platforms
- Tracks: 2

Construction
- Structure type: At-grade
- Accessible: Yes

History
- Opened: 1 December 1975

Services
Preceding station	Cercanías Madrid	Following station
Alcalá de Henares towards Chamartín	C-2	Meco towards Guadalajara
Alcalá de Henares towards Santa María de la Alameda or Cercedilla	C-8	Meco towards Guadalajara
Location

Alcalá de Henares Universidad is a railway station serving the University of Alcalá in the Community of Madrid, Spain. It is situated on the Madrid–Barcelona railway and is owned by Adif. The station is served by Cercanías Madrid lines C-2 and C-8.
