= Red Nacional de los Ferrocarriles Españoles =

Defunct state railway of Spain, 1941–2004

National Network of Spanish Railways
- Red Nacional de los Ferrocarriles Españoles

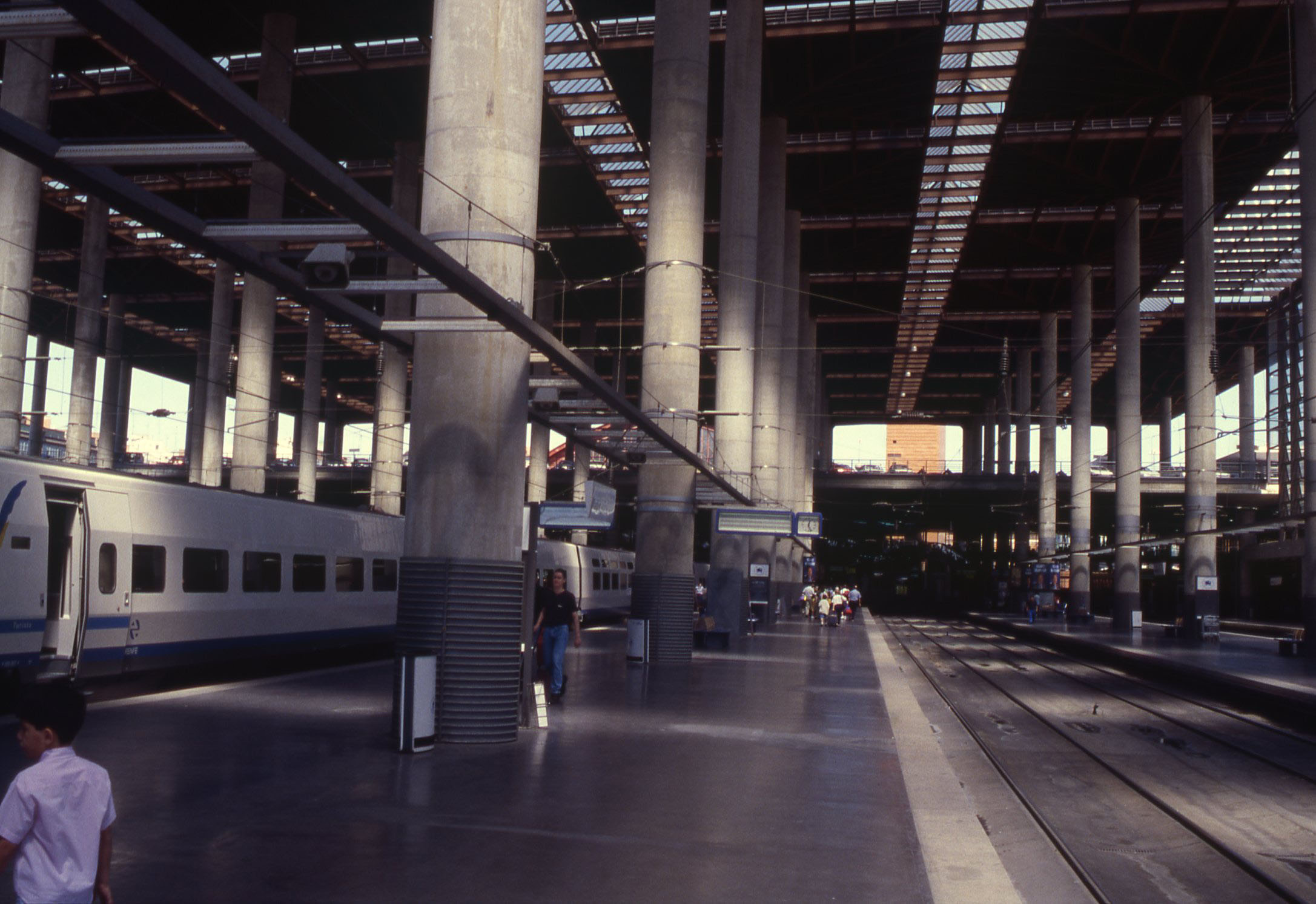
- An AVE train at Madrid-Atocha station in 1999
- Abbreviation: RENFE
- Predecessor: MZA; Norte; Oeste; FCA; ZH; GSSR; SM; SN
- Successor: Adif; Renfe
- Formation: February 1, 1941
- Dissolved: January 1, 2005
- Type: State-owned enterprise
- Headquarters: Madrid Spain
- Services: Passenger and freight rail transport
- Website: http://www.renfe.es

Red Nacional de los Ferrocarriles Españoles (RENFE) was a Spanish state-owned company that operated the national Iberian-gauge railway network between 1941 and 2005. For more than six decades and as a monopoly, it was exclusively responsible for the transport of passengers and goods on its lines, as well as for the management of its infrastructure.

It was founded in Spain at the beginning of 1941, after the end of the Spanish Civil War, and existed for almost 64 years until its dissolution on December 31, 2004. In compliance with European rail transport regulations, RENFE was divided into two new entities: Adif, the largest managing entity of Spanish railway infrastructures, and Renfe-Operadora, the company that took over the operation of the publicly owned railways. Subsequently, as of 2013, the same would happen with FEVE, the counterpart state-owned company in charge of the narrow-gauge railway network.

== History ==
=== Background ===
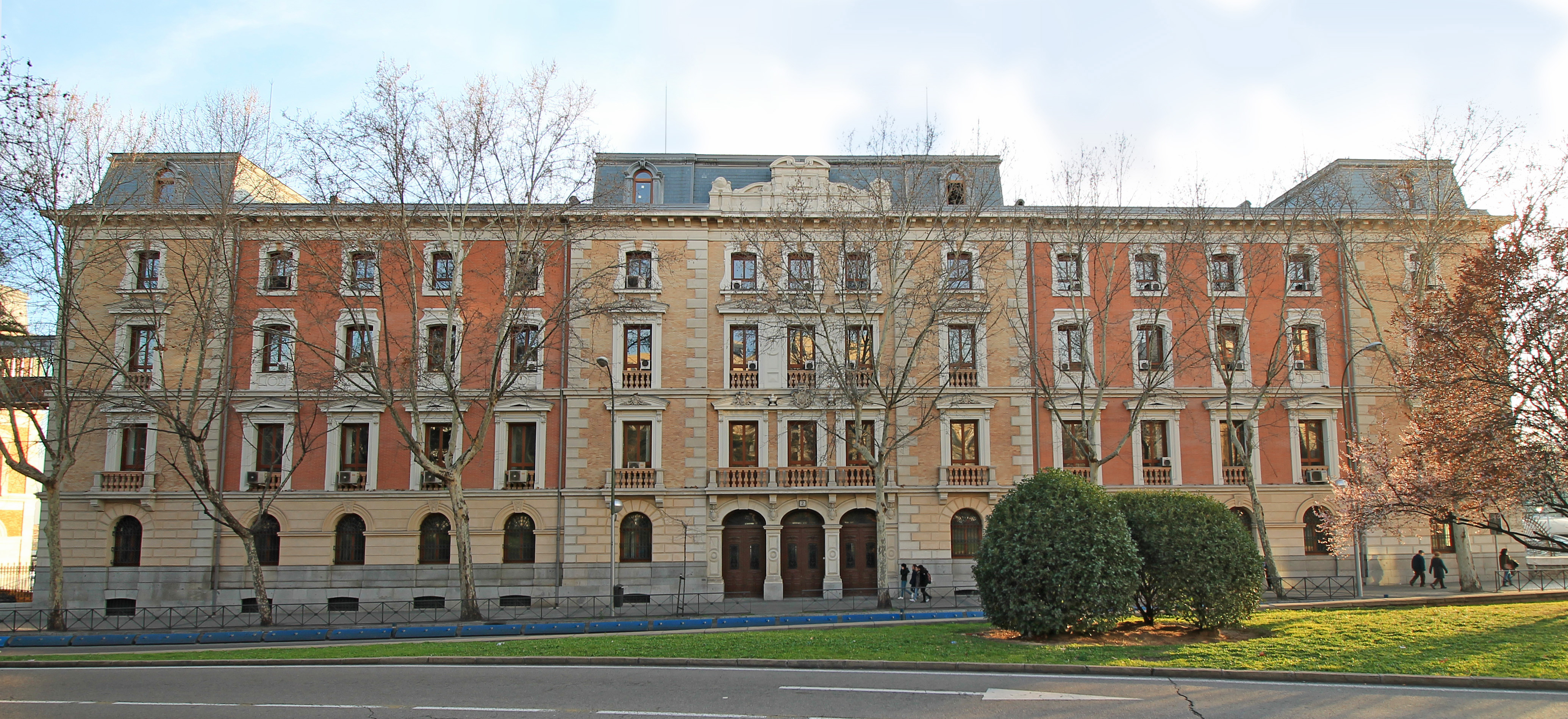
Former offices of RENFE in Madrid, formerly the administrative building of the M.Z.A. Company built in 1890.

The foundation of RENFE took place in the context of the Spanish Civil War, with a large part of the Spanish railway network severely damaged during the war. However, the question of the nationalization of the railroads was already a long-standing one, as Francesc Cambó, during his ministerial period, had already advocated this idea due to the poor performance of the private railway companies, which maintained an outdated rolling stock and sometimes even a railway line in poor condition. With the outbreak of the civil war on July 18, 1936, the railway companies were seized by the state in the State Decree of August 3, 1936. Although in the "uprising" or "nationalist" zone the railroads continued their independent existence, the actual control was exercised by the military and not by the Boards of Directors. After the war, thousands of kilometers of railway lines were unusable, and 40% of the rolling stock was destroyed and the rest was in need of repair. Faced with this situation, the new Francoist state in 1939 managed the railway companies that were unable to carry out their work, prior to the creation of RENFE in 1941.

=== 1941–1959 ===
On January 24, 1941, the Government approved the Ley de Bases de Ordenación Ferroviaria y de los Transportes por Carretera by which all the Iberian-gauge companies operating in Spain were reunited in a single state company, the Red Nacional de los Ferrocarriles Españoles, RENFE. Among the most important nationalized companies were the Compañía de los Caminos de Hierro del Norte de España (1858–1941), the Compañía del Ferrocarril de Madrid a Zaragoza y Alicante (1856–1941) and the Compañía Nacional de los Ferrocarriles del Oeste (1928–1941). The Compañía de los Ferrocarriles Andaluces, due to its dismal economic results, had already passed under State control in 1936, through its integration into the Compañía de los Ferrocarriles del Oeste. The next step taken by the state was the difficult task of calculating the amount of compensation to be received by the former companies. At the head of the priority of the collection of the ransoms paid by the State (which would end up being quite high) were the bondholders, followed by the shareholders and, lastly, in the event that there was something left to be distributed, the participating companies. Thus, RENFE became for almost 64 years the dominant company in Spanish railroads.

At the time of its creation, RENFE had 12,401 km of track as well as a varied and already outdated rolling stock from the old companies. In the first years of its existence it had to respond to shortages of all kinds and the pressing need to reconstruct the damage caused by the recent Civil War, a difficult task due to the scarcity of economic resources. The lack of spare parts and wear and tear of the material was the cause of many serious accidents, such as the one that took place in Torre del Bierzo in January 1944, the most serious in the history of Spain. In 1949 the General Plan for Reconstruction and Urgent Reforms (known at the time as the Guadalhorce Plan) was approved with the aim of solving the most important needs. Among other things, it foresaw 5,000 million pesetas for the renovation of the network and the development of an extensive program. The Plan also included the renewal of material: the acquisition of 200 locomotives, 5000 wagons and 400 passenger cars was foreseen to complete the initial orders since 1941.

In the fifties, the results of the Guadalhorce Plan began to be seen and to recover, in part, the pre-war situation, but Spain was an impoverished country and the improvements and beginnings of modernization were very timid. In spite of everything, some steps were taken that would be the timid symbol of the intended reforms. In the same year, 1950, the first commercial Talgo services between Madrid and Hendaye began, although this was not the only innovation; in 1952 the TAF diesel railcars came into service, which meant a great qualitative leap in long-distance travel. Two years later, in 1954, the first Centralized Traffic Control Center was inaugurated, located between Ponferrada and Brañuelas. Coinciding with the end of the decade, two events of great importance took place: in 1958 the Zamora-Ourense railroad, whose construction had begun in 1927 and which had dragged on until now, came into service. First "Suizas" for commuter traffic. However, this period of progress and investments planned by RENFE within the Stabilization Plan came to an abrupt halt in 1959, in response to the inflation and serious economic crisis experienced in Spain at the end of that decade. The causes of this serious crisis are the clear failure of the autarkic policy that had prevailed in Franco's regime since 1939 and that had tied up the Spanish economy.

=== 1960–1989 ===
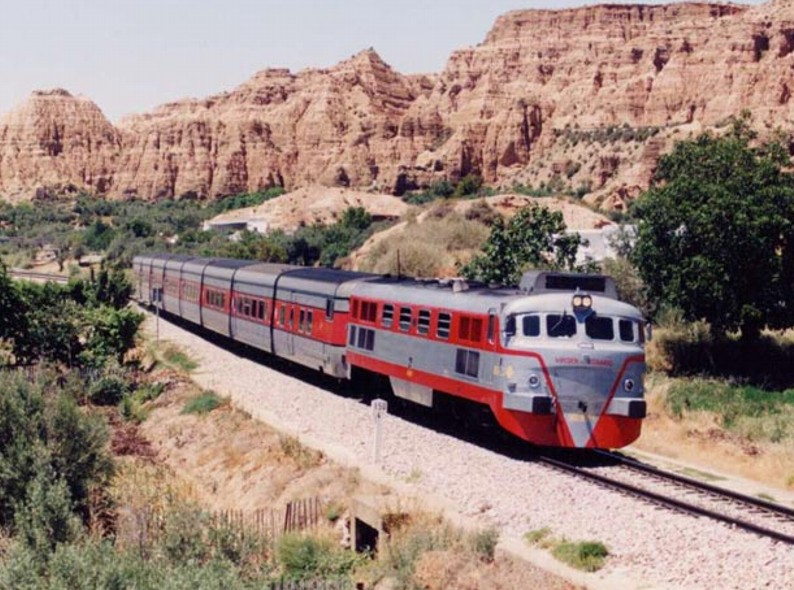
Talgo III near Guadix. From 1960 onwards, diesel and electric traction began to gain momentum.

The developmentalism of the sixties meant a progressive improvement in the Spanish economy, which was also reflected in the railroads. In this sense, there was a significant improvement in RENFE's rolling stock, although this did not reach all the lines or the entire rolling stock. The improvements were always made on the main lines that concentrated the most passenger traffic, as is the case of the Madrid-Barcelona line, which is electrified and equipped with double track on most of the route.

In the case of the railway network, in 1962 the World Bank, in an extensive report on the Spanish economy, recommended abandoning investments in new lines and focusing the budgetary effort on improving the existing network. The only project that was saved from these cuts was the Railway from Madrid to Burgos through Aranda de Duero, which would be inaugurated a few years later. Following the lines advocated by the World Bank report, in 1964 the Government approved the Ten-Year Modernization Plan from 1964 to 1973, which would bring modernization of the rolling stock and improvement of the railway network, allowing the maximum speed of some trains to be raised to 140 km/h in 1967. The beginning of the 1970s brought a slowdown in the Ten-Year Modernization Plan from 1964 to 1973, which eventually led to the birth of the RENFE Plan 1972–1975, with a major modernization program.

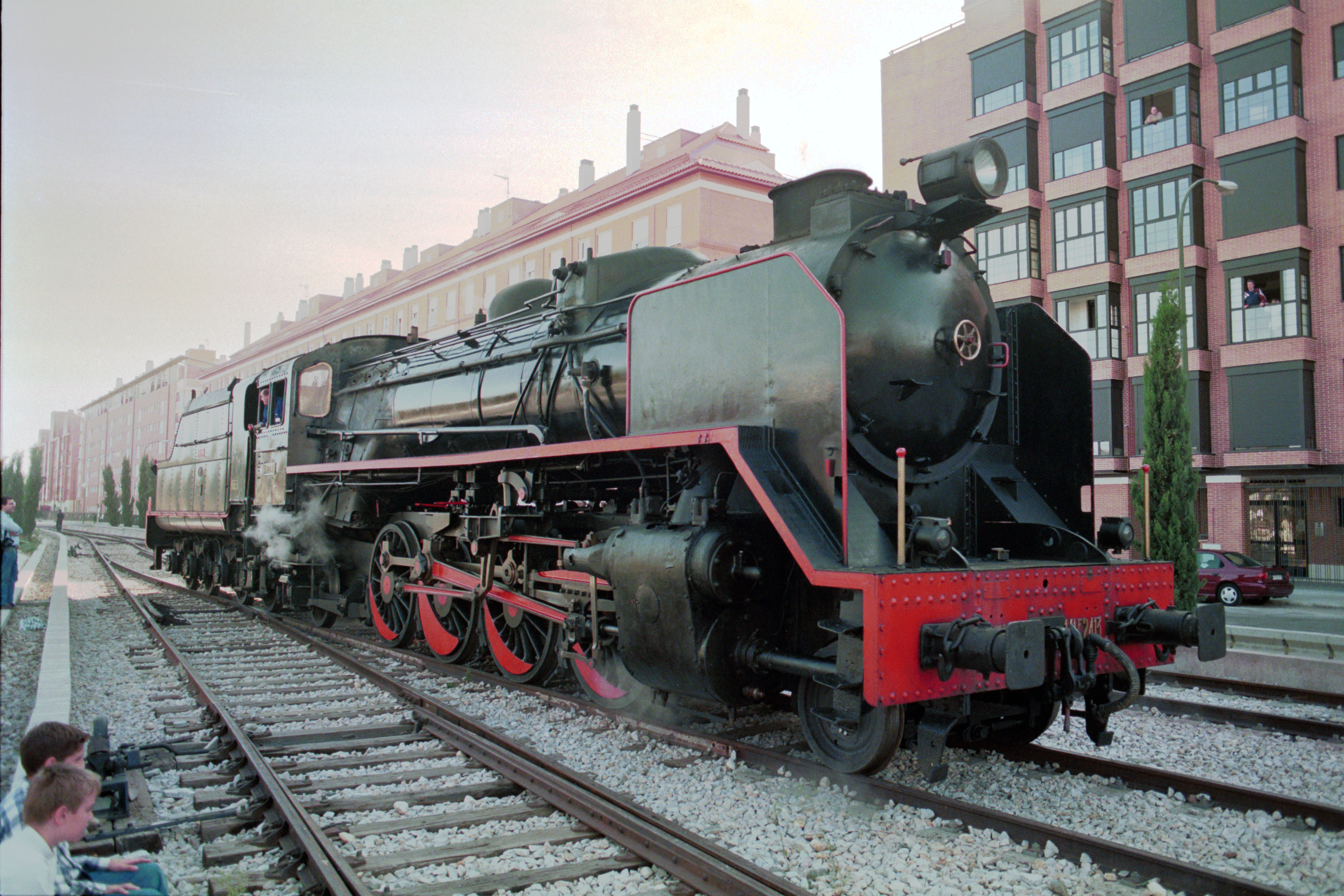
Mikado locomotive, would be the last steam traction locomotive to provide services with RENFE.

On June 23, 1975 the last steam locomotive (a Mikado, specifically number 141F 2348) was taken out of service at the Vicálvaro (Madrid) Classification Station. The disappearance of the steam traction will not be the only event that happens that year, as on November 20 the dictator Francisco Franco dies and with it begins the beginning of the end for the Franco regime. This will have an impact on RENFE as it will mark the beginning of an era of extensive reforms aimed at turning the Spanish railroads into an efficient means of transport. The situation that RENFE had reached at the end of the seventies with huge annual deficits and a railway service that was not only inefficient but also unsustainable. In 1979, the first Contract Program was signed, elaborated as the General Railway Plan, which was to be in force for 12 years, but which would only be partially implemented. In addition, Cercanías services began to be implemented in Madrid, Barcelona, Málaga and Valencia, with the aim of absorbing the passenger traffic moving in these large urban centers. Cercanías will become one of the crown jewels for RENFE. However, any new reform plan clashed with reality.

In 1984 RENFE found itself in a critical situation with gigantic annual deficits, and the fact is that its trains run mainly on only 5000 km of the 13000 km of track it manages: there were too many lines that were not profitable. For this reason, the 1984 Contract Program was agreed upon, whereby on January 1, 1985, 914 km of track were closed and 933 km were left for freight use only: 12 lines and 132 stations were left without service. In addition, the autonomous communities came to the rescue of more than 600 km to avoid their closure. The modernization of facilities such as the stations of Madrid, Seville and Barcelona, which are undergoing profound transformations to adapt to new needs, will be carried out. Many other stations and tracks are also being modernized. In particular, Atocha traffic was absorbed by Chamartín Station until the inauguration of the new Atocha Station in 1992.

=== 1991-2005 ===
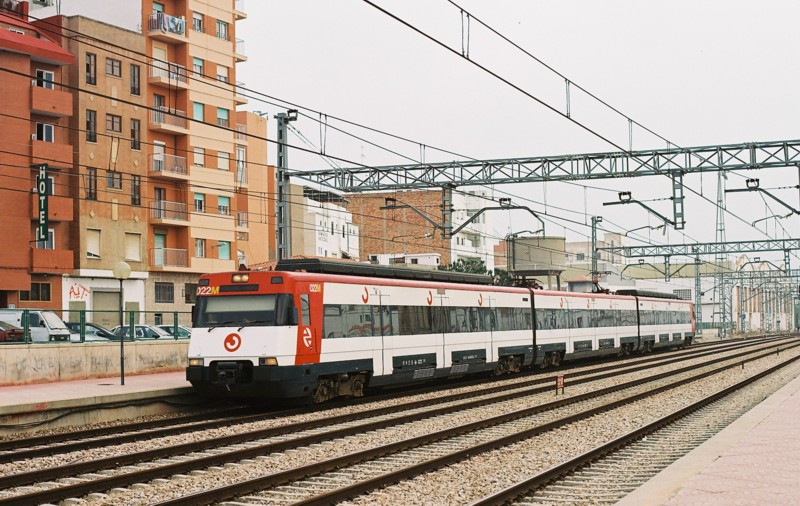
Cercanías Unit of the Class 447, an image that became common after the creation of the Business Units and, with it, the creation of the Cercanías.

Continuing with the projects already launched in the eighties, in 1991, work continued on the New Railway Access to Andalusia (NAFA), which involved the construction of Santa Justa Station to concentrate rail traffic in Seville. This in turn led to the dismantling of the San Bernardo and Plaza de Armas stations in Seville. A large part of these works carried out in the city of Seville had another reason: the celebration of the 1992 Universal Exposition (Expo 92). In Barcelona, there was a reorganization of the track system that circulated through different areas of the city, as well as the improvement and adaptation of some stations such as Barcelona-Término (renamed Estació de França) and Barcelona-Sants. As in Seville, these works were carried out within the framework of an urban reorganization, in this case, for the celebration of the 1992 Olympic Games in Barcelona. On April 14, 1992, the Madrid-Seville high-speed line was inaugurated, coinciding with the opening of Expo'92. It was a great moment for RENFE and the History of the Spanish railroads, which gave the world an image of modernity thanks to the publicity of Expo'92 and the Barcelona Olympics.

Another important measure was the creation of the Business Units in 1991, a consequence of the thorough reorganization of RENFE's railway services and whose creation will eventually lead to the disappearance of the territorial model of the Zonas. This new model pursues economic profitability, reducing bureaucracy and the high costs involved in the organization of the Zones. From now on, RENFE will be organized around three main business units: Cercanías, Media Distancia and Larga Distancia.

On December 30, 1998, the company Gestor de Infraestructuras Ferroviarias (GIF) was founded, a public business entity that was created due to the railway transport measures that the European Union began to promote from the Council Directive 91/440/EEC on the Development of Community Railways, which established (among other issues) the separation between the train operators and the infrastructure manager. In 2003, the Madrid-Lleida section of the Madrid-Zaragoza-Barcelona-French Border high-speed line was inaugurated (at 200 km/h), the second to be inaugurated in Spain after the Madrid-Seville line and the first of the 21st century.

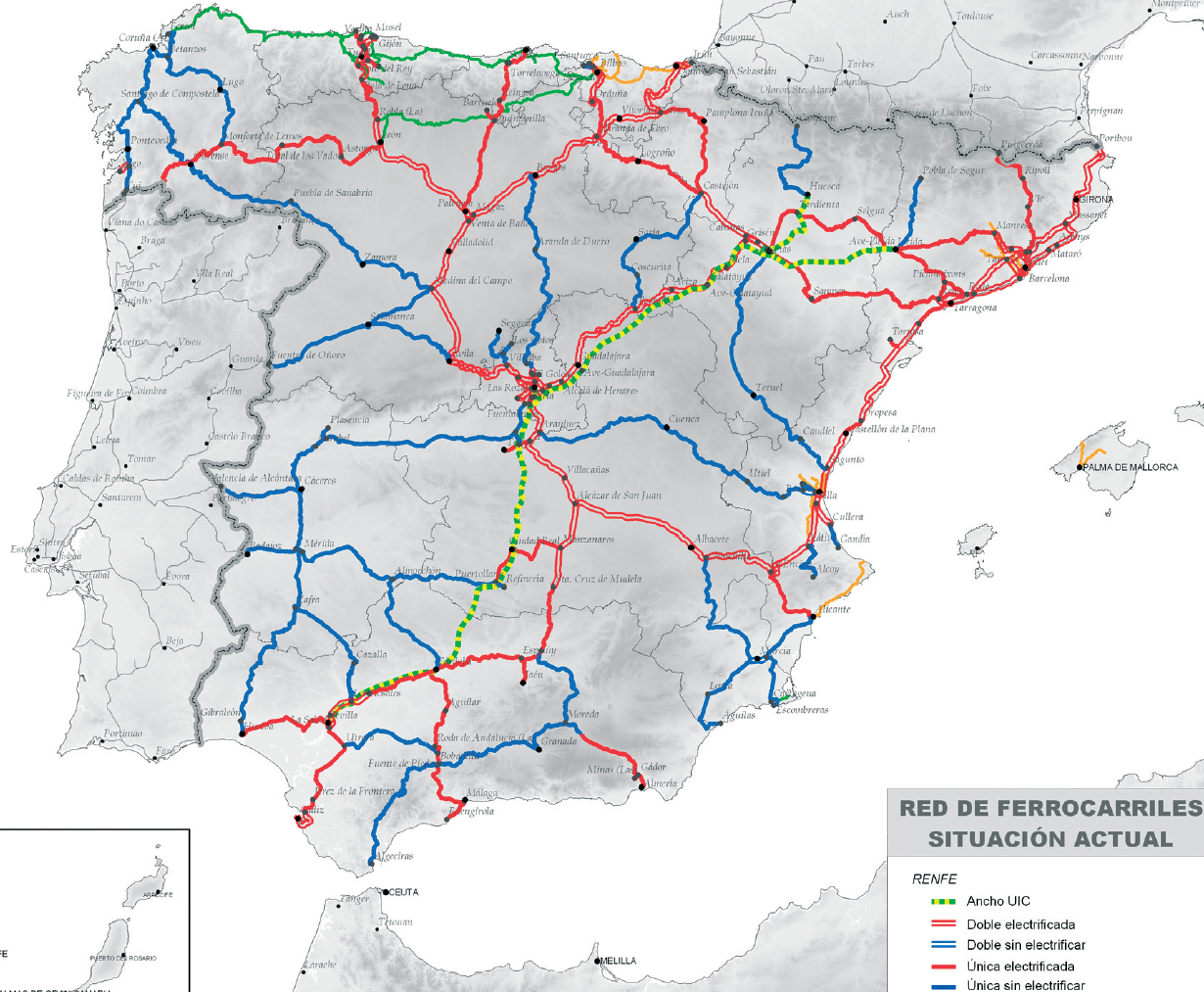
Map of the railroad network in 2005, when RENFE was officially dissolved.

Due to the new economic directives of the European Union, the State had to open the railway network to competition, so a new legislation for the railway sector (LSF, or Law 39/2003 of the Railway Sector), which was supposed to come into force on June 1, 2004, but was delayed with the assumption of the Government of José Luis Rodríguez Zapatero to January 1, 2005. On that day, the public business entity "Renfe" was separated from RENFE, and from that moment on, the latter began to be called "Administrador de Infraestructuras Ferroviarias" (Adif). The functions of the former company were divided between the two new entities:

- Renfe-Operadora, which is in charge of freight and passenger transport, in competition with other companies. It also carries out the maintenance and manufacture of railway material, participating in important national and international projects.
- Adif, which manages tracks, stations, communications, etc., charging a fee to the companies that use the network, including Renfe.

== Internal structure ==
As of 1990, the internal structure of the company changed with the creation of the Business Units, restructured as follows:

- Cercanías Business Unit
- Regional Business Unit
- Long Distance Business Unit - Major Lines
- High Speed Business Unit
- Freight Business Unit
- Combined Transport Business Unit
- Goods and Logistics Business Unit
- Integral Train Maintenance Business Unit
- Infrastructure Maintenance Business Unit

== Presidents ==
Name	Start	Final	Notes
Gregorio Pérez Conesa	January 21, 1941	January 30, 1944	Nationalization of the railroads and creation of RENFE.
Eduardo Alfonso Quintanilla	January 30, 1944	February 11, 1947	
Rafael Benjumea y Burín	February 11, 1947	October 23, 1952	
Alfonso Peña Boeuf	October 23, 1952	July 3, 1957	
Agustín Plana Sancho	July 3, 1957	July 20, 1962	Abandonment of the Baeza-Utiel Line.
Carlos Mendoza Gimeno	July 20, 1962	July 22, 1967	
Leopoldo Calvo-Sotelo	July 22, 1967	July 26, 1968	Inauguration of the Madrid–Burgos direct railroad.
Alfonso Osorio García	July 26, 1968	June 6, 1970	
Francisco Lozano Vicente	June 6, 1970	December 19, 1975	Death of Francisco Franco.
Plácido Álvarez Fidalgo	December 19, 1975	February 22, 1978	
Enrique de Guzmán Ozamiz	February 22, 1978	April 3, 1978	
Ignacio Bayón Mariné	April 3, 1978	June 18, 1980	
Alejandro Rebollo Álvarez-Amandi	June 18, 1980	September 4, 1982	
Antonio Carbonell Romero	September 4, 1982	January 4, 1983	
Ramón Baixados Male	January 4, 1983	September 12, 1985	1984 Contract Program: Closure of loss-making lines.
Julián García Valverde	September 12, 1985	March 16, 1991	
Mercè Sala Schnorkowski	March 16, 1991	June 18, 1996	Inauguration of the Madrid-Seville high-speed line.
Miguel Corsini Freese	June 18, 1996	May 8, 2004	Inauguration of the Madrid-Lerida high-speed line.
José Salgueiro Carmona	May 8, 2004	January 1, 2005	Disappearance of RENFE.

== Territorial organization ==
=== Origins ===
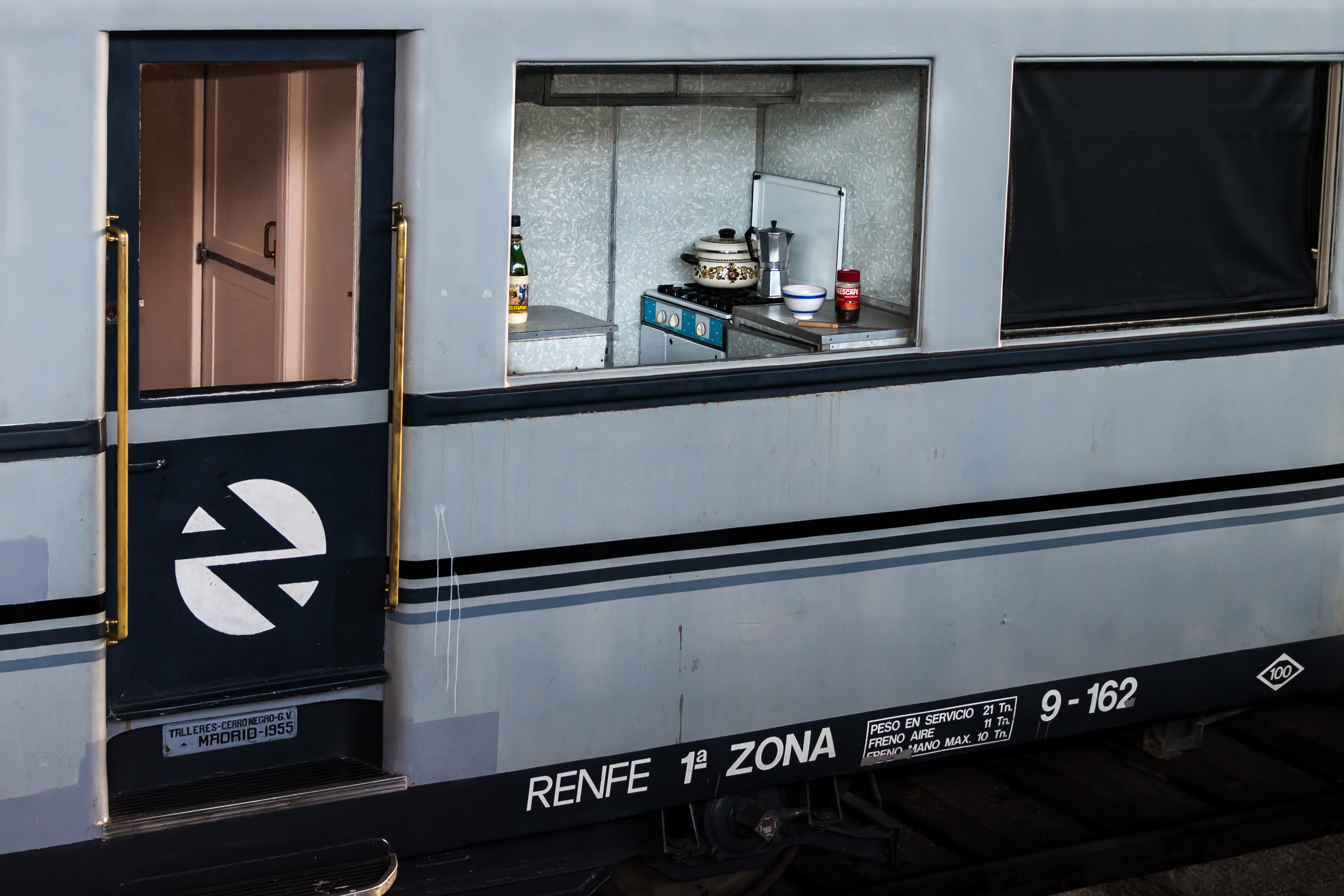
Railcar of the 1st Zone of RENFE, currently preserved in the Railway Museum of Madrid

In its first five years of operation, the early RENFE maintained a bureaucratic division of its network based largely on the territorial boundaries of the former absorbed companies, so it used to speak of the "North zone", the "MZA zone", the Andalusian zone, and so on.

This system soon proved to be obsolete and on April 6, 1948, a new division by zones was implemented, creating a total of seven zones, which received the same name where their center was located: Madrid-North, Madrid-Atocha, Seville, Valencia, Barcelona, Bilbao and Leon. In the case of Madrid it was divided in two, so that the railroads leaving Madrid to the north had their center in the North Station (nowadays Príncipe Pío Station) while those leaving to the south had their center in Atocha Station. The cars and wagons were marked on a label (generally located on the underside of the wagon) with the number of the zone to which they belonged. The Zone Directors came to have, especially in the decades of the forties and fifties, an almost military authority, often having small automobiles for their personal transportation to inspect the routes they were in charge of.

=== The Zones of the Network ===
This division of the 7 zones remained almost intact for many years, the limits of the zones being in 1973 marked by the following lines:

- First zone (Madrid-North): with its central services in Madrid, Príncipe Pío station. It extended along the lines originating in Madrid to the north, with limits from west to east, in Palazuelo-Empalme, Portugal border, Puebla de Sanabria, Astorga, Santander, Venta de Baños, Burgos and Coscurita. The Venta de Baños-Burgos section of the line from Madrid to Irún had belonged to the Sixth Zone in 1948.
- Second zone (Madrid-MZA): Based in Madrid, Atocha station, and limits on the border with Portugal to the West, Zafra, Almorchón, Santa Cruz de Mudela and Villarrobledo in the South, Utiel to the East, and Casetas and Soria in the Northwest limit.
- Third zone (Seville): Practically coincided with the Andalusian region, and its limits were Zafra, Almorchón, Santa Cruz de Mudela and Baza.
- Fourth zone (Valencia): It included the Levantine region and the province of Teruel. Its limits were, from south to north, the stations of Baza, Villarrobledo, Utiel, Calatayud, Zaragoza-Delicias and Tortosa.
- Fifth zone (Barcelona): It included Catalonia and Aragon and reached the French border, to the north; Zaragoza and Tortosa, to the west and south, respectively. The head of the zone was Barcelona-Término.
- Sixth zone (Bilbao): With southern limits in Casetas, Calatayud, Soria, Burgos and Venta de Baños. In Calatayud there was for a long time the only case of coexistence of three Renfe zones in a single town, as the line from Madrid to Barcelona (ex-MZA) belonged to the 2nd zone, the line from Calatayud to Cidade Dosante (ex-SM) to the 6th zone and the line from Calatayud to Valencia (ex-CA) to the 4th zone. In the original 1948 division, Zones 2, 5 and 6 coexisted in Casetas.
- Seventh zone (León): It comprised the provinces of Galicia, Asturias and León, with headquarters in the capital of the latter province and boundaries in Palencia, Astorga and Puebla de Sanabria.

As a result of the completion of the works from the Plan of Railway Links of 1933, a large number of new lines were incorporated to RENFE in the area of Madrid-capital between 1967 and 1972, giving rise to numerous points of contact between the First and Second Zone. Madrid had ceased to be a terminus station for many passenger trains, to become a passing station, which eventually ended up imposing the unification of the two zones into one, called "Zona Centro". The opening of Chamartín Station in 1967, which led to the decline of Estación del Norte, also had an influence on this, and its responsibilities were transferred to Atocha Station. In order to avoid an unassigned number, number 2 was given to the Asturian-Galician-Leonese area previously represented by number 7.

On January 1, 1987, RENFE put into effect Circular number 5372, by which the size of the Central Zone was reduced, in order to balance its size with that of the peripheral zones. In the 1990s, the "zones" gradually disappeared and were replaced by operational management, reflecting the end of military terminology in favor of Anglo-Saxon-inspired corporate terminology. In 2005, the competences of the National Network at infrastructure level were transferred to Adif, and those of rolling stock and operation to Renfe.

== Engine material ==
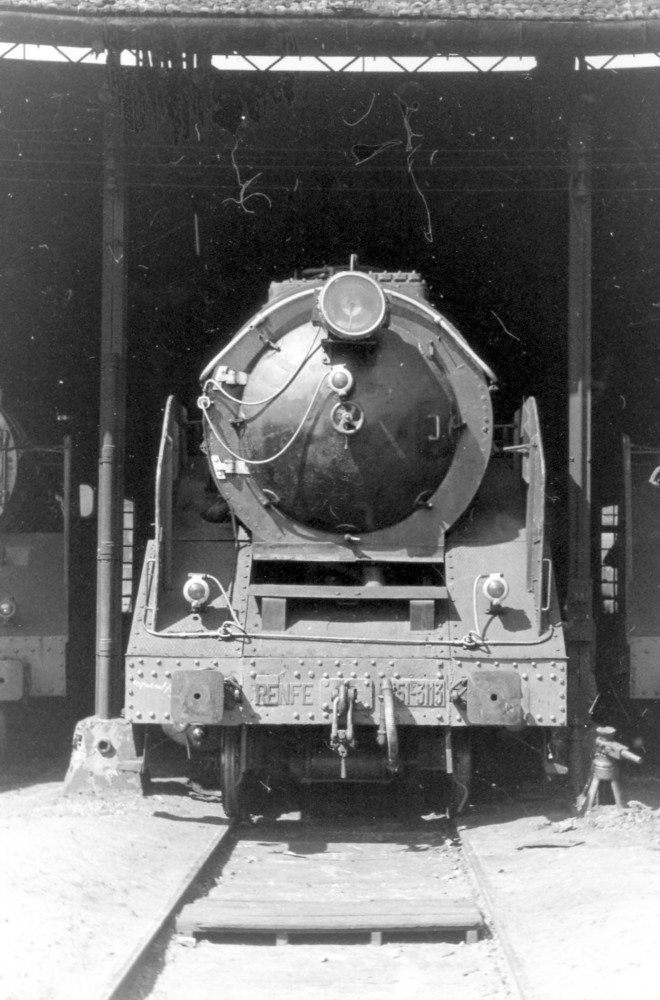
151-3101 Class to 3122 steam locomotive at Zaragoza-Portillo Station (1965)

- Steam traction
- Diesel traction
- Electric traction

== Bibliography ==
- Artola, Miguel (1978). Ferrocarriles en España 1844–1943, Tomo 1: El estado y los ferrocarriles (in Spanish). Madrid: Servicio de Publicaciones del Banco de España.
- Anes Álvarez de Castrillón, Rafael (1978). Ferrocarriles en España 1844–1943, Tomo 2: Economía y los ferrocarriles (in Spanish). Madrid: Servicio de Publicaciones del Banco de España.
- Lentisco, David (2005). Cuando el hierro se hace camino, Historia del Ferrocarril en España (in Spanish). Madrid: Alianza Editorial.
- Wais, Francisco (1974). Historia de los Ferrocarriles Españoles (in Spanish). Madrid: Editorial Española.
