= Alcalá de Henares railway station =

Railway station in Alcalá de Henares, Spain

Alcalá de Henares
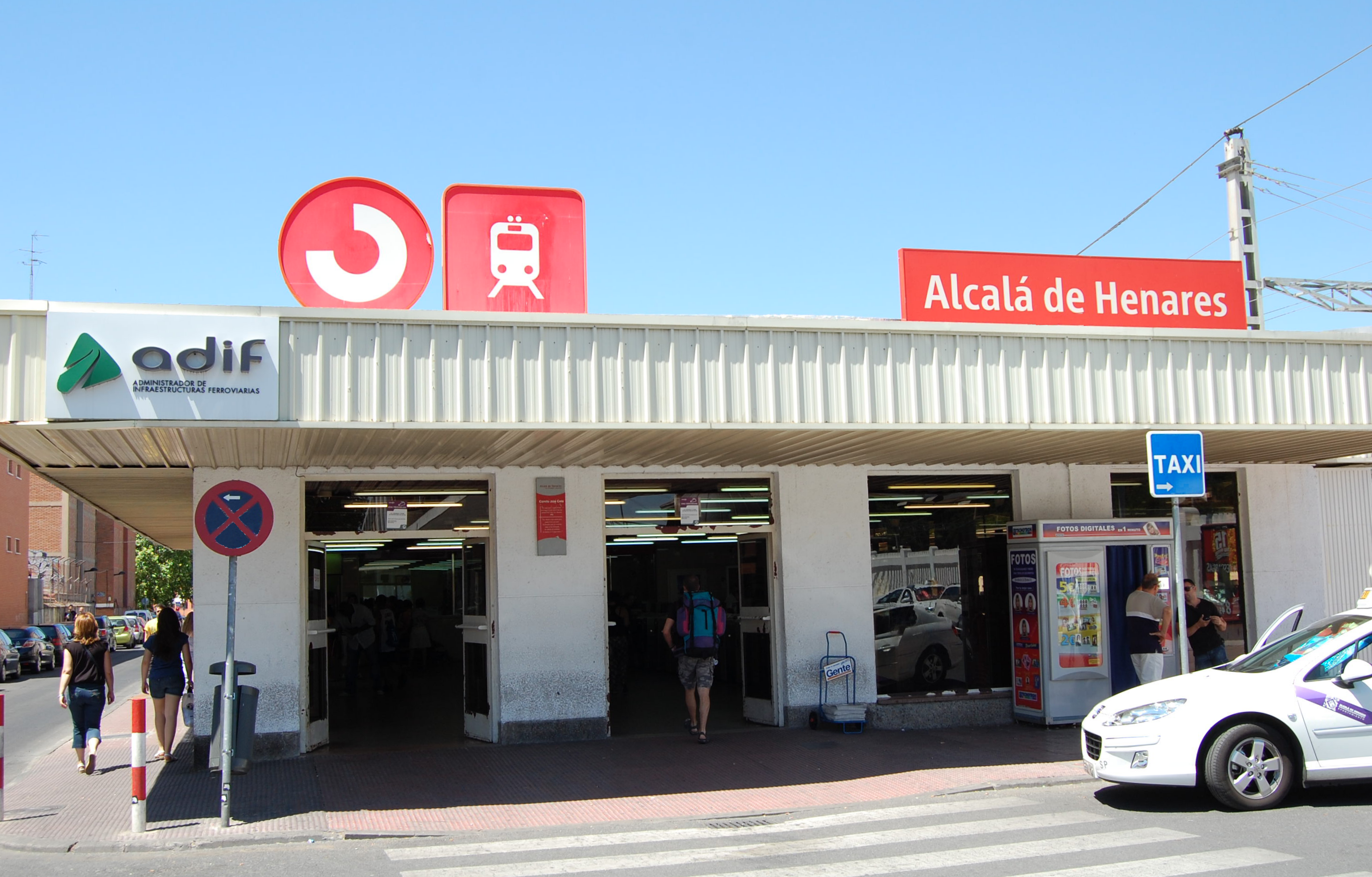
- Main entrance

General information
- Location: Calle Belvis del Jarama, Alcalá de Henares, Community of Madrid; Spain
- Coordinates: 40.489°N 3.366°W
- Owner: Adif
- Operator: Renfe Operadora
- Line: Madrid–Barcelona (PK 33.5)
- Platforms: 3 island platforms
- Tracks: 6

Construction
- Structure type: At-grade
- Accessible: Yes

History
- Opened: 3 May 1859
Location

Alcalá de Henares is a railway station serving the city of Alcalá de Henares in the Community of Madrid, Spain. It is on the Madrid–Barcelona railway and is owned by Adif. The station is served by Cercanías Madrid lines C-2 and C-7.

Preceding station	Renfe Operadora	Following station
Madrid Chamartín Terminus	Media Distancia 54	Guadalajara towards Soria
Madrid Chamartín Terminus	Media Distancia 55	Guadalajara towards Zaragoza–Delicias
Preceding station	Cercanías Madrid	Following station
La Garena towards Chamartín	C-2	Alcalá de Henares Universidad towards Guadalajara
La Garena towards Príncipe Pío	C-7	Terminus
La Garena towards Santa María de la Alameda or Cercedilla	C-8	Alcalá de Henares Universidad towards Guadalajara
