= Torrijos railway station =

Railway station in Torrijos, Spain

Torrijos
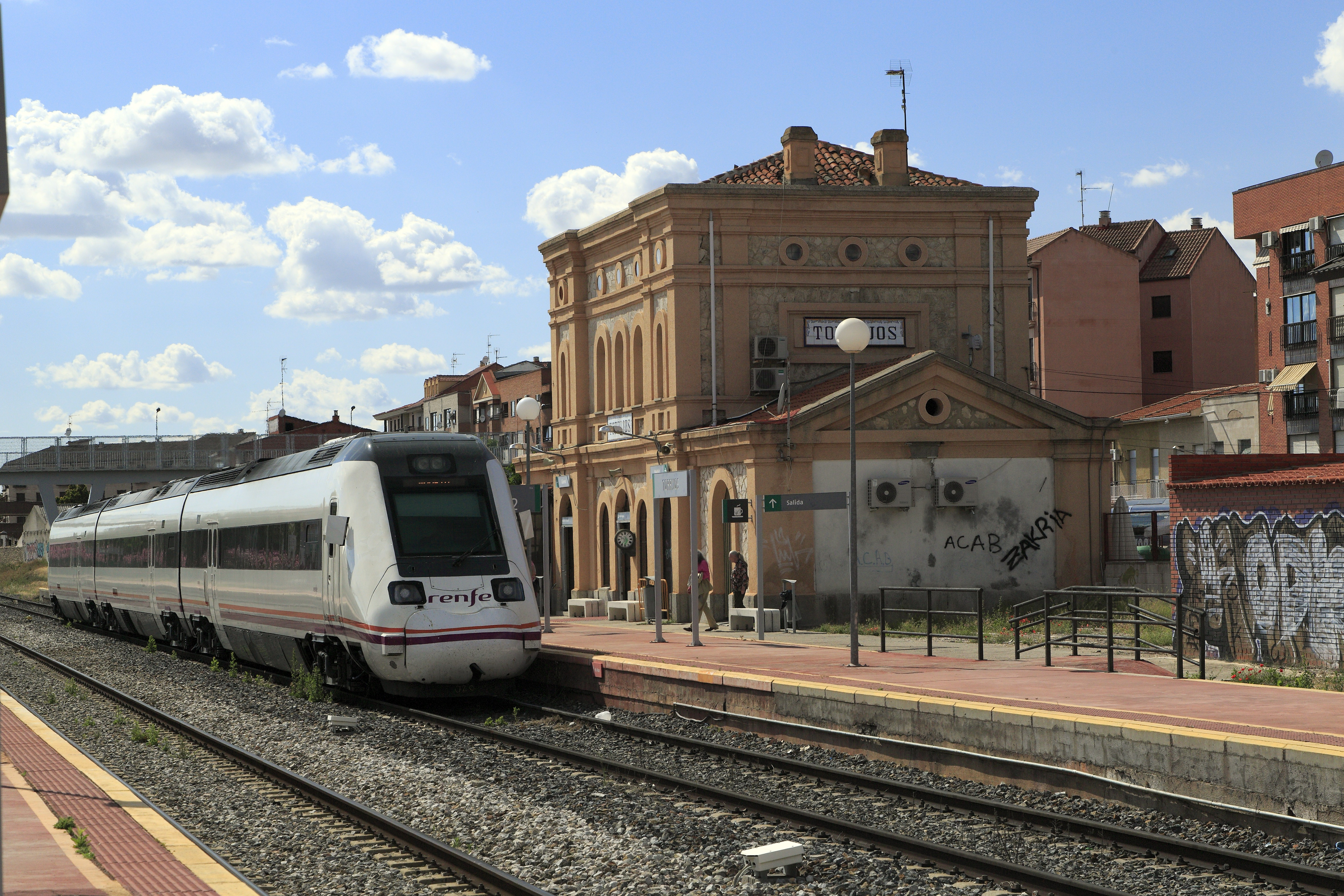

General information
- Location: Avenida Estación S/N, Torrijos, Toledo, 45500
- Coordinates: 39.9789578°N 4.2830853°W
- Owner: Adif
- Operator: Renfe
- Line: Line 52
- Platforms: 2

Other information
- Station code: 35105

History
- Opened: 20 June 1876; 150 years ago
Location

The Torrijos railway station is railway station owned by ADIF that serves the Spanish municipality of Torrijos, province of Toledo.

== History ==
The 2-storey historicist station—built in granite and featuring round-arch windows and doors— was inaugurated on 20 June 1876, by means of the opening of the 85.42 kilometre-long Madrid–Torrijos stretch of the Madrid–Extremadura line. Soon after, the Torrijos–Talavera de la Reina stretch (48.76 km), was inaugurated on 13 July 1876.

At 17:40 on 14 January 2019, a derailment (with no injuries) occurred 500 metres from the station. According to Renfe, it was a case of sabotage.

== See also ==
- Madrid–Valencia de Alcántara railway
