= Torralba del Moral =

Coordinates: 41°08′N 2°30′W

- Interactive map of Torralba del Moral
- Country: Spain
- Province: Soria
- Municipality: Medinaceli
- Elevation: 1,104 m (3,622 ft)

Population (2012)
  - Total: 53
- Time zone: UTC+1 (CET)
  - Summer (DST): UTC+2 (CEST)

Torralba del Moral is a village under the local government of the municipality of Medinaceli, Soria, Spain. It has a railway station at a junction where the branch to Soria splits from the Madrid-Zaragoza line.

== See also ==
- Torralba and Ambrona (archaeological site)
