= Talavera de la Reina railway station =

Railway station in Talavera de la Reina, Spain

Talavera de la Reina
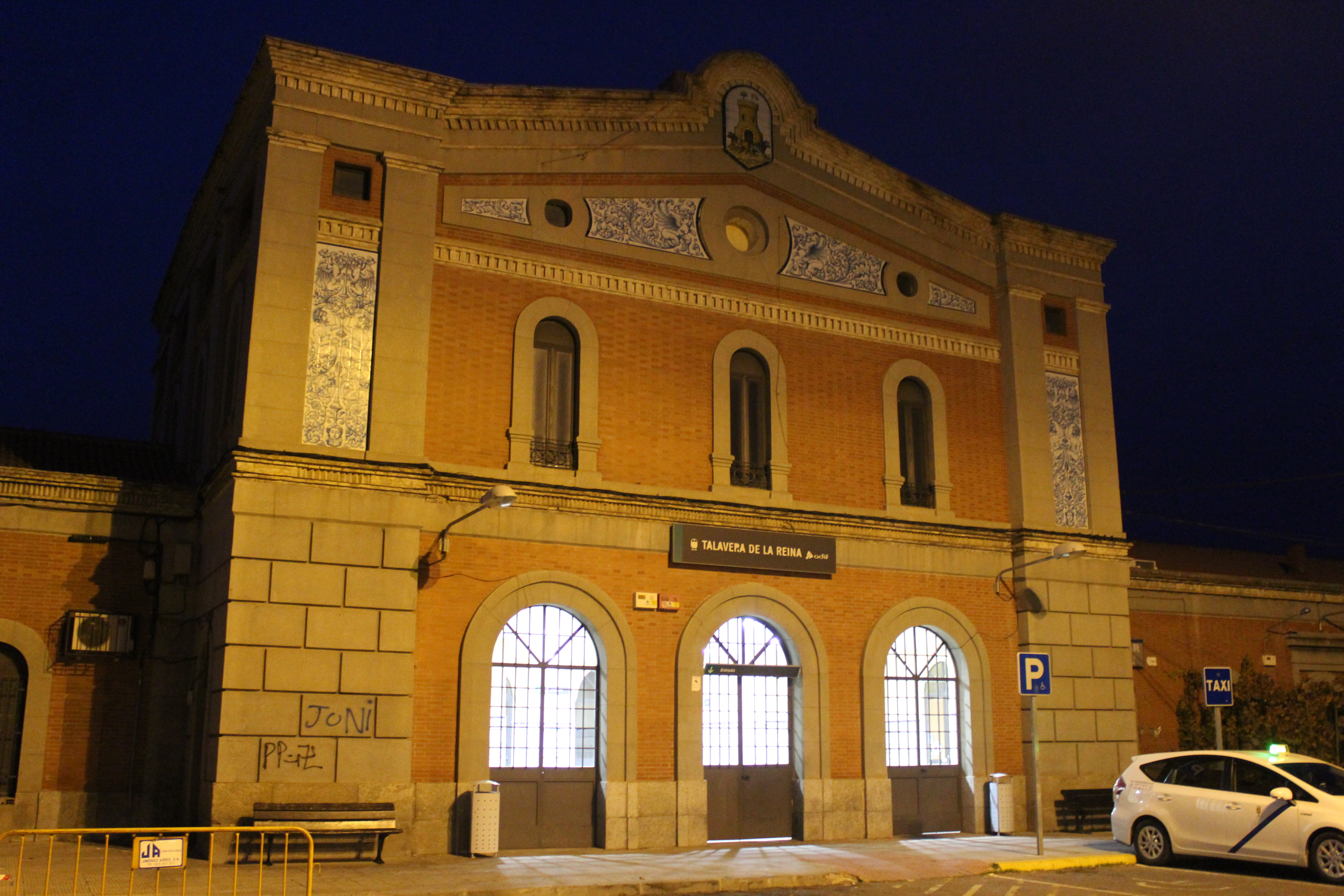
- Main entrance to the station

General information
- Location: Paseo Estación Ferrocarril S/N, Talavera de la Reina, Toledo, 45600
- Coordinates: 39.970572°N 4.826569°W
- Owner: Adif
- Operator: Renfe
- Line: Line 52
- Platforms: 2

Other information
- Station code: 35200

History
- Opened: 13 July 1876; 150 years ago
Location

Talavera de la Reina railway station is a railway station serving the Spanish city of Talavera de la Reina, in the province of Toledo.

== History and description ==
The station was inaugurated on 13 July 1876, as the 48.76 km Torrijos–Talavera stretch of the Madrid–Extremadura line was opened on that day. Soon later, on 2 September 1877, the 35.0 km stretch from Talavera to Oropesa was opened. The façade of the building displays ornamental tiles.

It lies at the kilometre 134.2 of the conventional gauge railway line linking Madrid to Valencia de Alcántara.

Renfe Operadora operates Media Distancia passenger services between Madrid and Talavera, as part of the Line 52. It also operates Regional and Intercity services. As of January 2020, the station features an average of 106 users per day.
