= Guadalajara railway station =

Railway station in Guadalajara, Spain

Guadalajara
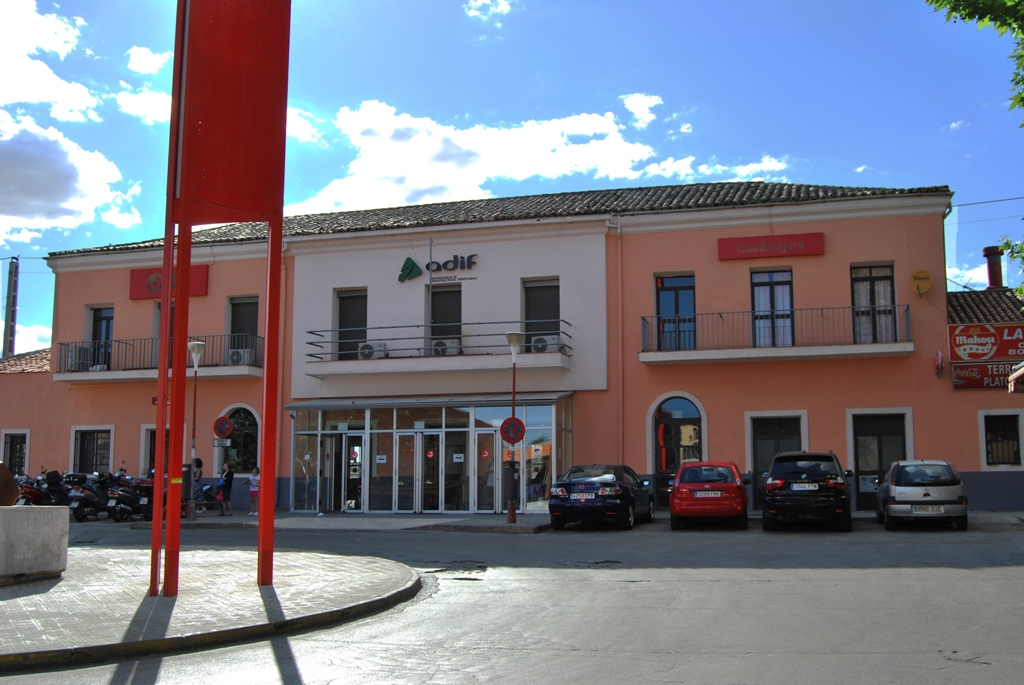

General information
- Coordinates: 40°38′34″N 3°10′59″W
- Owner: adif
- Line: Madrid–Barcelona (PK 56.8)

History
- Opened: 3 May 1859; 167 years ago
Location

Guadalajara railway station (Spanish: Estación de Guadalajara) is a Spanish railway station owned by ADIF that serves the Spanish city of Guadalajara. There is another station outside the urban limits 5 km away from the city on the Madrid–Barcelona high-speed rail line called Guadalajara–Yebes railway station.

The Madrid–Guadalajara stretch was opened on 3 May 1859. Conversely, the Guadalajara–Jadraque stretch was opened on 5 October 1860.

Preceding station	Renfe Operadora	Following station
Alcalá de Henares towards Madrid Chamartín	Media Distancia 54	Jadraque towards Soria
Alcalá de Henares towards Madrid Chamartín	Media Distancia 55	Yunquera de Henares towards Zaragoza–Delicias
Preceding station	Cercanías Madrid	Following station
Azuqueca towards Chamartín	C-2	Terminus
Azuqueca towards Santa María de la Alameda or Cercedilla	C-8	Terminus
