= Madrid–Valencia de Alcántara railway =

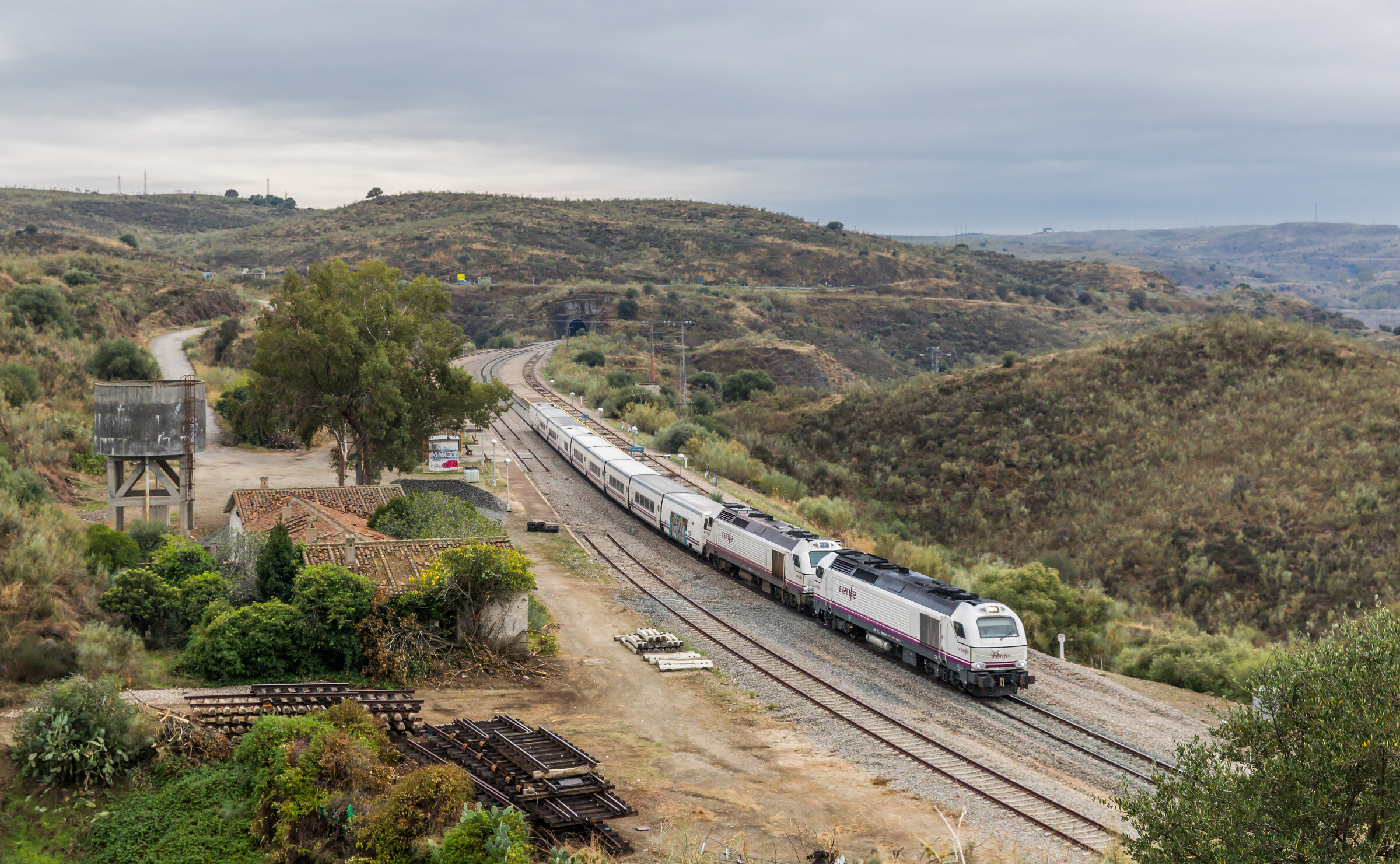
- RENFE rolling stock at Río Tajo station

Overview
- Status: Operational
- Owner: Adif
- Termini: Madrid Planetarium bifurcation; Valencia de Alcántara

Service
- Operators: Renfe Media Distancia; Cercanías Madrid

Technical
- Track gauge: 1,668 mm (5 ft 5 21/32 in) Iberian gauge

The Madrid–Valencia de Alcántara line is an Iberian-gauge railway in Spain owned by ADIF. It is one of the main legacy lines across Extremadura and the province of Toledo, serving cities such as Talavera de la Reina and Cáceres. Part of the stretch across the Madrid region (up until Humanes) is used by commuter service C-5.

== History and description ==
The line was conceived as a union of three different stretches commissioned to different companies: Madrid–Malpartida de Plasencia, Malpartida de Plasencia-Cáceres and Cáceres-Valencia de Alcántara and beyond (to the Portuguese border),

The international connection between Spain and Portugal via Valencia de Alcántara was inaugurated on 8 October 1881. The Lisbon-Madrid-Paris Sud Express began operation in 1887.

Since August 2012, the connection with Portugal via Valencia de Alcántara has been severed, and the Trenhotel Lusitania connecting Lisbon and Madrid began operating via the province of Salamanca instead.

The railway is electrified from Madrid to Humanes. The aforementioned double-track electrified stretch is integrated in Cercanías Madrid's service C-5. Starting from the boundary of the municipality of Humanes, the railroad line continues without electrification on a single track. The electrification from Plasencia to Humanes is also projected.

== Stations ==
- Torrijos
- Talavera de la Reina
- Cáceres

== See also ==
- Ramal de Cáceres
