= Madrid–Burgos railway =

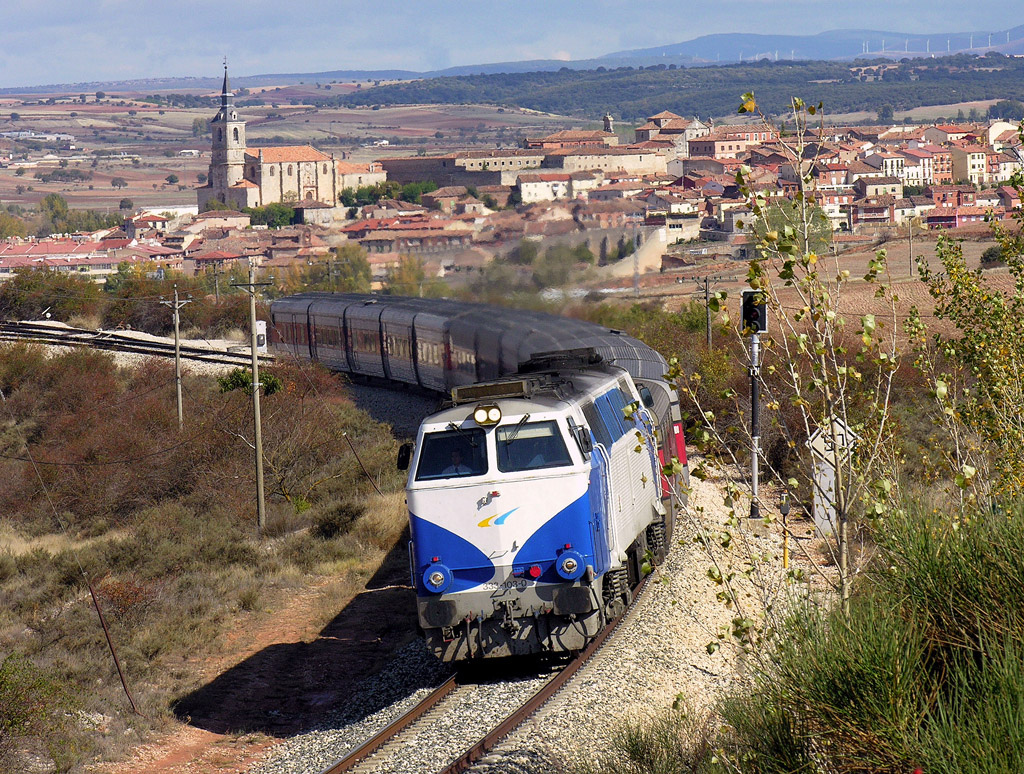

Overview
- Status: Non-operational (Colmenar Viejo–Aranda); Operational (Madrid-Colmenar Viejo/Aranda–Burgos)
- Owner: Adif
- Termini: Madrid Chamartín; Burgos Railway Variant

Service
- Operator: Cercanías Madrid

Technical
- Line length: 280 km (170 mi)
- Track gauge: 1,668 mm (5 ft 5 21/32 in) Iberian gauge

The Madrid–Burgos railway also known as Madrid–Aranda–Burgos railway is a railway connecting Madrid and Burgos via the Somosierra Tunnel and Aranda de Duero in Iberian gauge.

It consists of a 25 km-long double-track electrified stretch from Madrid to Colmenar Viejo (used by Cercanías services) and a single-track non-electrified segment beyond Colmenar Viejo.

Upon a March 2011 landslide in the Somosierra Tunnel, the 159 km-long stretch from Colmenar Viejo to Aranda de Duero has been left abandoned. The 96 km-long stretch from Aranda to the new Burgos Railway Variant has been used for freight transport.
