= Madrid–Valencia railway =

Railway line in Spain

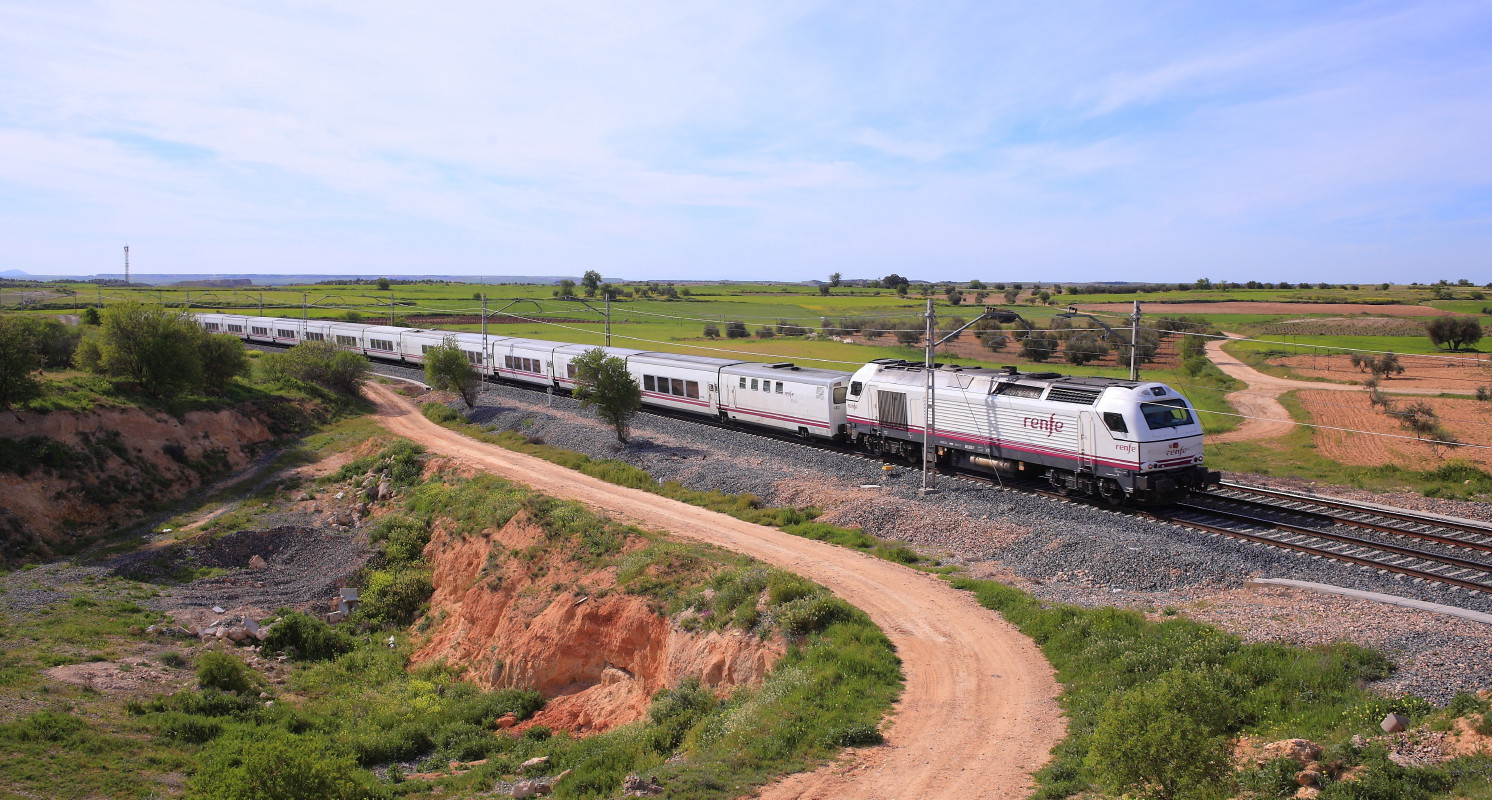
- RENFE rolling stock at the height of El Romeral

Overview
- Status: Operational
- Owner: Adif
- Termini: Madrid Chamartín; Valencia-Nord

Service
- Operator: Renfe Operadora

History
- Opened: 9 February 1851

Technical
- Line length: 480.6 km (298.6 mi)
- Track gauge: 1,668 mm (5 ft 5 21/32 in) Iberian gauge

The Madrid–Valencia railway is the conventional railway line linking the Spanish capital Madrid with the country's third largest city of Valencia in the Valencian Community. It now primarily serves local commuter rail services and regional traffic since the opening of the Madrid–Levante high-speed rail network in 2010.

== History ==
Prior to the opening of the high-speed rail line between Madrid and Valencia, the classic Iberian gauge railway provided a travel time of 3 hours and 30 minutes between the two cities.

== Services ==
The line is used by Cercanías Madrid's C-3 service and the C-3 of Cercanías Valencia; along with numerous regional services along various stretches of the line. The Regional Express service runs the full distance between Madrid and Valencia, taking 6 hours and 36 minutes with stops at numerous intermediate stations; since the opening of the AVE high-speed rail line travel has been reduced to 1 hour and 40 minutes non-stop, freeing up the older slower line for other traffic.
