= Soria railway station =

Railway station in Spain

Soria
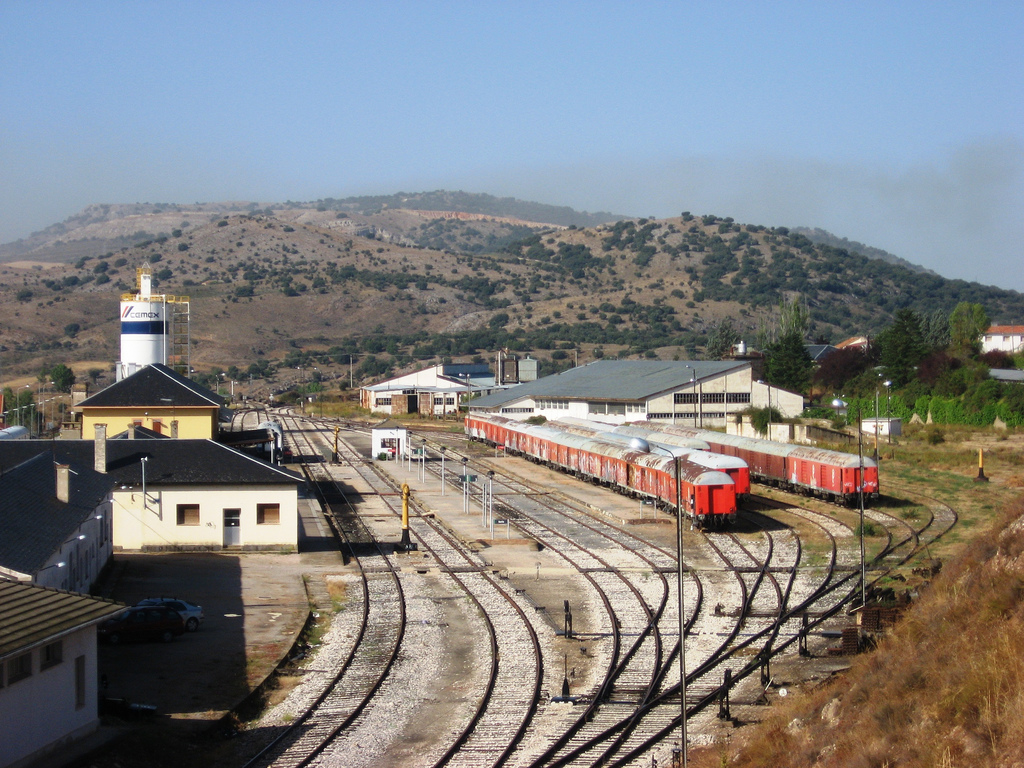

General information
- Location: Soria; Spain
- Coordinates: 41°45′18″N 2°28′33″W
- Owner: adif

Passengers
- 2018: 17,154
Location

Soria Railway Station (IATA: RII) is the railway station of Soria, Spain.

It's a terminus, but in the past trains continued into the interior of the province.

The line runs 94 km from Soria to Torralba, where it joins the conventional Madrid-Zaragoza-Barcelona line.

Preceding station	Renfe Operadora	Following station
Quintana Redonda towards Madrid Chamartín	Media Distancia 54	Terminus
