= Humanes de Madrid =

- Municipality
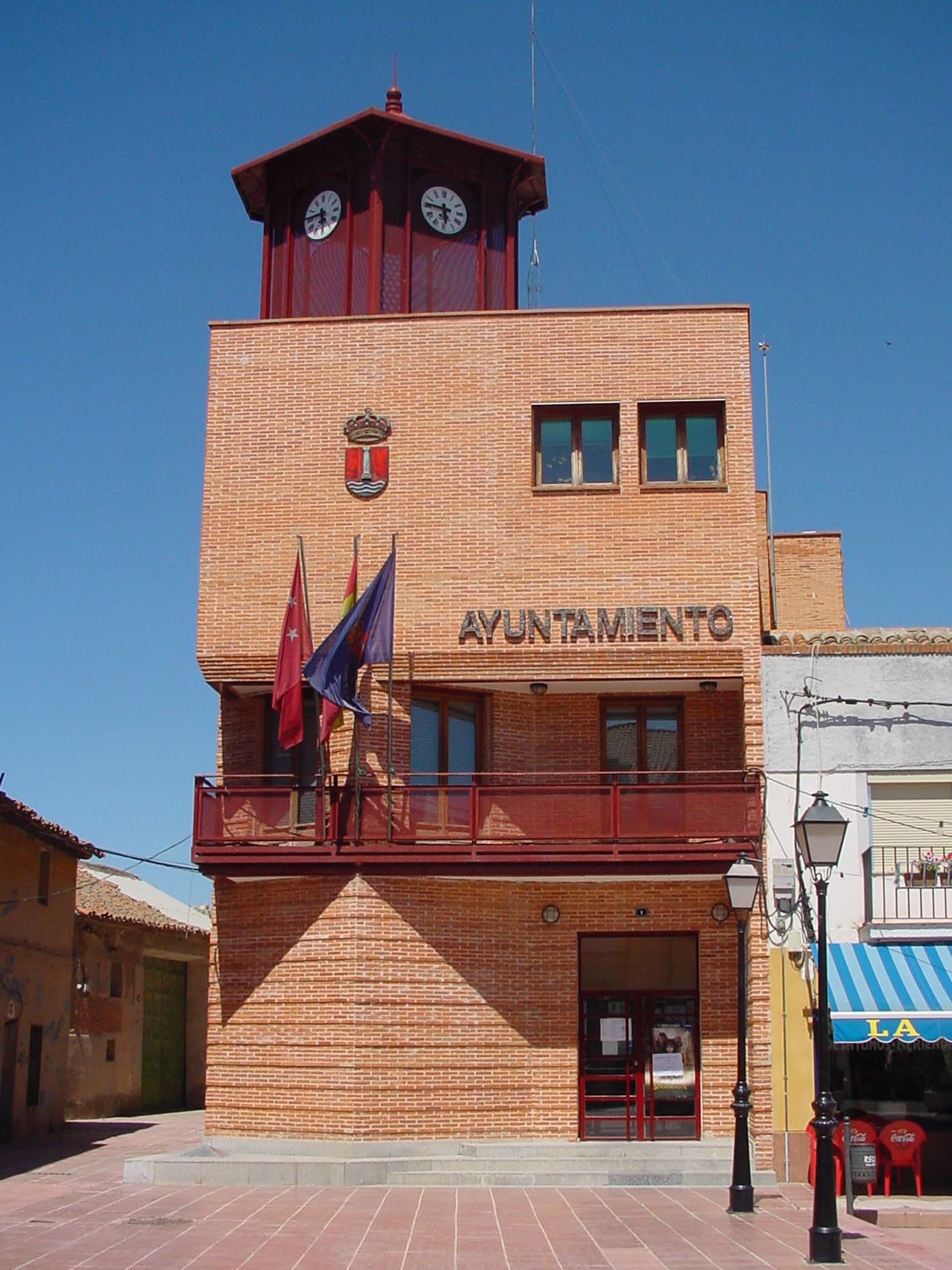

- Flag Coat of arms

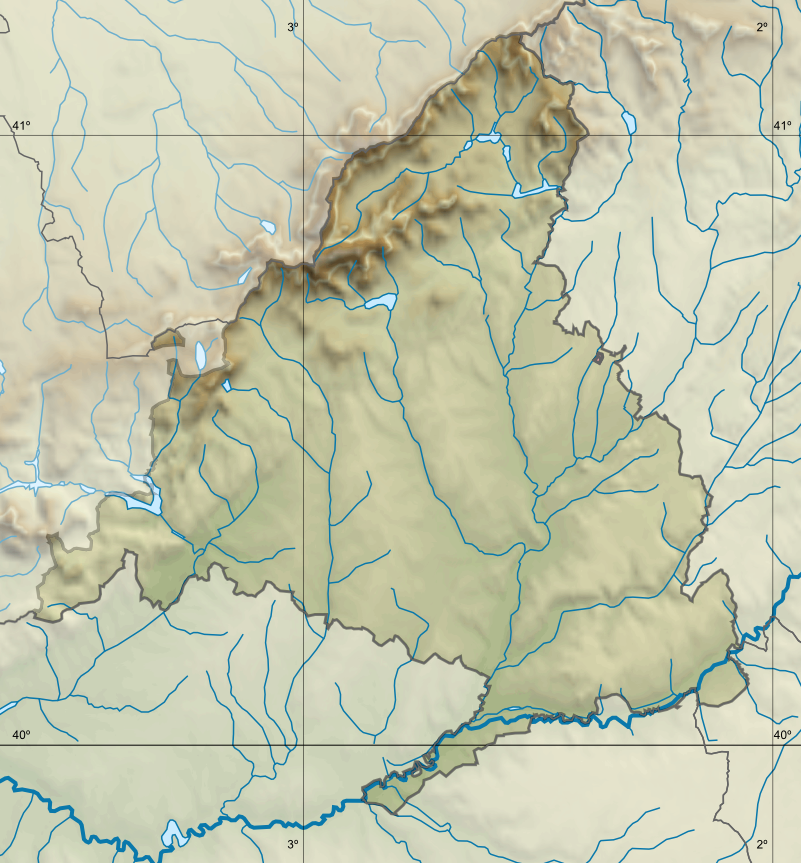
- Location within Spain Location within Community of Madrid
- Coordinates: 40°15′14″N 3°49′40″W
- Country: Spain
- Autonomous community: Community of Madrid

Government
  - Alcalde: José Antonio Sánchez Rodríguez (PP)

Area
  - Total: 19.46 km^{2} (7.51 sq mi)
- Elevation: 677 m (2,221 ft)

Population (2025-01-01)
  - Total: 20,500
  - Density: 1,050/km^{2} (2,730/sq mi)
- Demonym: Humanenses
- Time zone: UTC+1 (CET)
  - Summer (DST): UTC+2 (CEST)
- Postal code: 28970
- Dialing code: (+34) 91
- Website: Official website

Humanes de Madrid is a town and municipality of Spain, part of the Community of Madrid. As of 2019, it has a population of 19,743 inhabitants.

== Geography ==
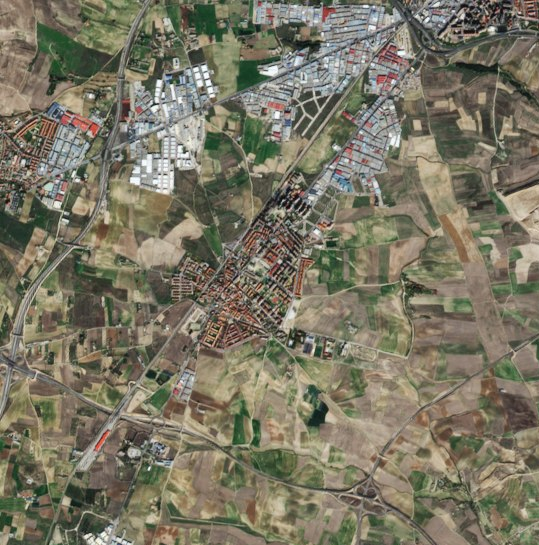
Humanes as seen by the European Space Agency's Sentinel-2.

The municipality, with a total area of 1946 km^{2}, features a largely flat relief, with the altitude ranging from the roughly 700 metres above sea level of the Cerro del Lomo to the roughly 644 metres of the Arroyo de las Arroyadas close to its confluence with the Arroyo de Valdenovillo del Prado, at the southeastern end of the municipality.

== History ==
Humanes is first mentioned in a 1141 document, when Alfonso VII donated the town to its first Lord. Humanes belonged to the Land of Toledo for the entire early modern period.
