= Madrid-Chamartín-Clara Campoamor railway station =

Railway station in Madrid, Spain

Madrid-Chamartín-Clara Campoamor
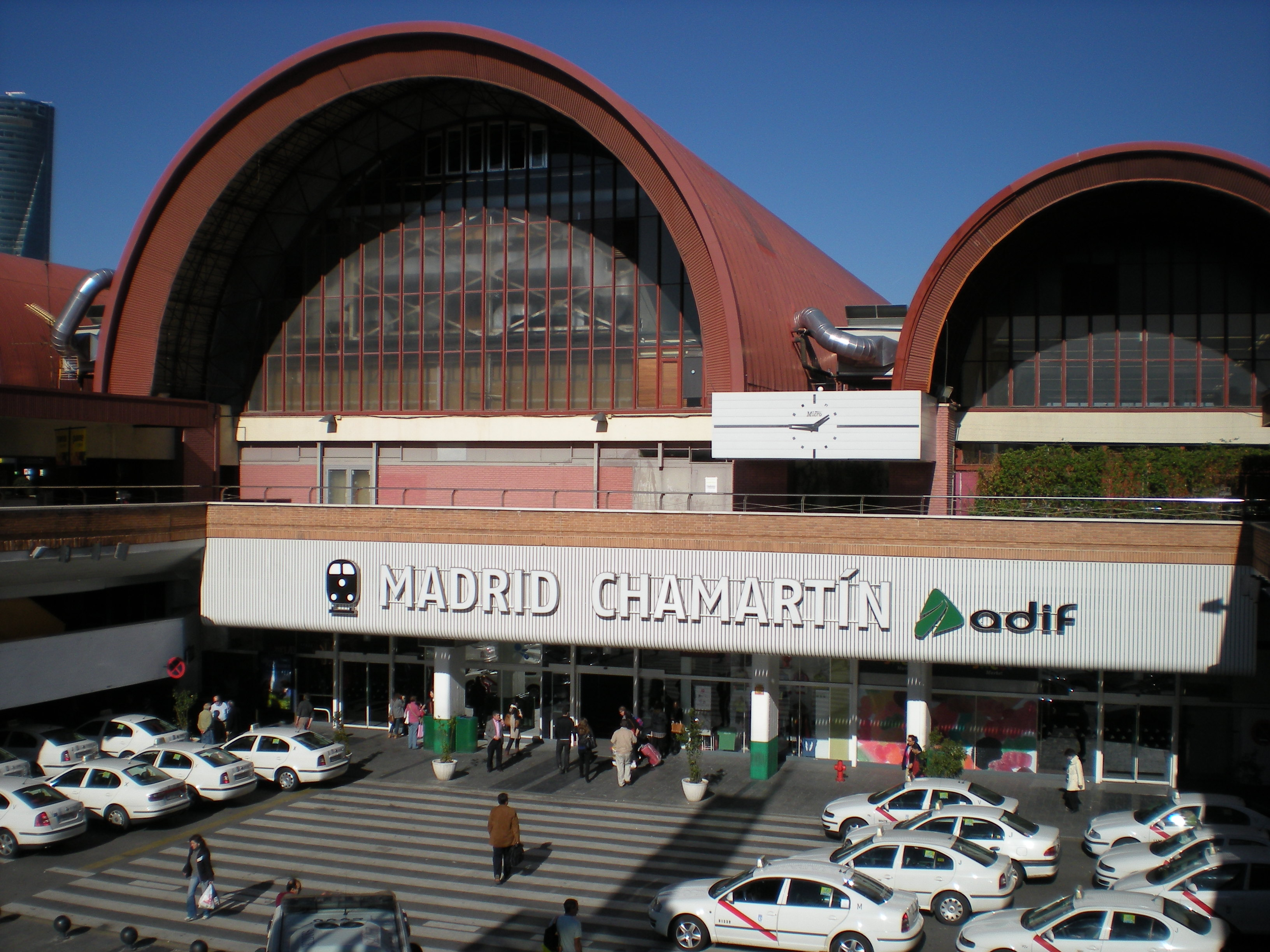

General information
- Location: Chamartín, Madrid; Spain
- Coordinates: 40.472101°N 3.6826857°W
- Owner: ADIF
- Operator: ADIF and CRTM
- Lines: Madrid–León (high-speed) (PK 0.0); Madrid–Levante (high-speed) (PK 0.0); Madrid–Barcelona (PK 0.0); Madrid–Hendaye (PK 0.0); Madrid–Burgos (PK 0.0); Madrid–Valencia (PK 0.0)
- Tracks: 21

Construction
- Accessible: yes

Other information
- Fare zone: A

History
- Opened: 1967; 59 years ago

Passengers
- 2018: 32,961,547

Services
Preceding station	Ouigo España	Following station
Terminus	Madrid to Valencia	Valencia-Joaquín Sorolla Terminus
Terminus	Madrid to Alicante	Albacete-Los Llanos towards Alicante
Preceding station	Madrid Metro	Following station
Bambú towards Pinar de Chamartín	Line 1	Plaza de Castilla towards Valdecarros
Begoña towards Hospital Infanta Sofía	Line 10	Plaza de Castilla towards Puerta del Sur
Location
- Location within Madrid

The Estación de Madrid-Chamartín Clara Campoamor is the second major railway station in Madrid, Spain. Located on the northern side of the city, it was built between 1970 and 1975, but more work was carried on into the early 1980s. It then superseded Atocha station, which is located just south of the city centre. However, as the AVE network expanded with a hub at Atocha, Chamartin again became Madrid's second station by passenger volume.

It hosts the railway networks connecting Madrid and north-western Spain, the AVE (high-speed line) from Madrid to Segovia, Valladolid and León and many Cercanías lines (commuter rail), as well as the international line to Lisbon. There are also connections with Atocha. Since July 2022, both stations are connected by a direct tunnel. Under the railway station is Chamartín Metro Station, linking with lines 1 and 10 of the Madrid Metro, also for travelling to Madrid City Centre.

Since September, 2022 Chamartin also holds the East and South East high speed lines that connect Madrid with Murcia and the Valencian Community.

== Renfe trains platforms and destinations ==
Chamartín Renfe train station has 21 platforms, numbered from west to east.

Most of the trains attach to the following platforms:

1	North-South long-distance trains
2	Commuter trains C-4 > Sol (Madrid Metro) - Parla
3	C-3 > Sol- Aranjuez
4	C-4 > Alcobendas-San Sebastian de los Reyes / Colmenar Viejo
5	C-3 > El Escorial
6-7	Long-distance trains / Media distancia Renfe
8-9	Commuter trains via Recoletos: C-1 > Atocha - Principe Pio; C-2 > Alcala de Henares / Guadalajara; C-7 > Alcala de Henares; C-7 > Atocha - Principe Pio - ... C-10 > Atocha - Principe Pio - Villalba
10	Northbound: C-7 > Pitis - Principe Pio - ... C-8 > El Escorial / Cercedilla
11	C-1 > Airport T4; C-7 > Fuente de la Mora; C-10 > Fuente de la Mora
12-15	Long distance / Media distancia Renfe
16-21	Long distance and AVE high speed trains

== Services ==
=== Long-distance trains ===
Preceding station	Renfe Operadora	Following station
Cuenca-Fernando Zóbel towards Valencia-Joaquín Sorolla	AVE	Terminus
Cuenca-Fernando Zóbel towards Murcia del Carmen	AVE	Terminus
Cuenca-Fernando Zóbel towards Alicante	AVE	Terminus
Cuenca-Fernando Zóbel towards Alicante	AVE	Zamora towards Ourense-Empalme
Cuenca-Fernando Zóbel towards Alicante	AVE	Valladolid-Campo Grande towards León
Cuenca-Fernando Zóbel towards Valencia-Joaquín Sorolla	AVE	Valladolid-Campo Grande towards Burgos-Rosa de Lima
Terminus	AVE	Valladolid-Campo Grande towards León
Terminus	AVE	Valladolid-Campo Grande towards Burgos-Rosa de Lima
Terminus	AVE	Zamora towards Ourense-Empalme
Cuenca-Fernando Zóbel towards Valencia-Joaquín Sorolla	Avlo	Terminus
Cuenca-Fernando Zóbel towards Alicante	Avlo	Terminus
Cuenca-Fernando Zóbel towards Murcia del Carmen	Avlo	Terminus
Terminus	Alvia	Segovia-Guiomar towards Bilbao-Abando
Terminus	Alvia	Segovia-Guiomar towards Ferrol
Terminus	Alvia	Segovia-Guiomar towards Gijón
Terminus	Alvia	Segovia-Guiomar towards Hendaye
Terminus	Alvia	Segovia-Guiomar towards Lugo
Terminus	Alvia	Segovia-Guiomar towards Pontevedra
Terminus	Alvia	Segovia-Guiomar towards Santander
Terminus	Alvia	Valladolid-Campo Grande towards Vitoria-Gasteiz
Terminus	Alvia	Segovia-Guiomar towards Vigo-Urzáiz
Madrid Atocha towards Alicante	Alvia	Segovia-Guiomar towards Gijón
Madrid Atocha towards Alicante	Alvia	Segovia-Guiomar towards Santander
Madrid Atocha towards Cádiz	Alvia	Valladolid-Campo Grande towards Gijón
Madrid Atocha towards Cádiz	Alvia	Valladolid-Campo Grande towards Santander
Madrid Atocha towards Oropesa del Mar	Alvia	Valladolid-Campo Grande towards Gijón

=== Regional trains ===
Preceding station	Renfe Operadora	Following station
Madrid Atocha Terminus	Media Distancia 51	Villalba towards Ávila
Nuevos Ministerios towards Madrid Atocha	Media Distancia 53	Villalba towards Segovia
Terminus	Media Distancia 54	Alcalá de Henares towards Soria
Terminus	Media Distancia 55	Alcalá de Henares towards Zaragoza–Delicias
Terminus	Media Distancia 57	Madrid Atocha towards Albacete-Los Llanos
Terminus	Media Distancia 58	Aranjuez towards Ciudad Real
Terminus	Media Distancia 58	Madrid Atocha towards Jaén
Terminus	Avant 86	Segovia-Guiomar towards Valladolid-Campo Grande

=== Cercanías Madrid ===
Preceding station	Cercanías Madrid	Following station
Terminus	C-1	Fuente de la Mora towards Aeropuerto T4
Terminus	C-2	Nuevos Ministerios towards Guadalajara
Terminus	C-2 CIVIS	Fuente de la Mora towards Guadalajara
Terminus	C-3	Nuevos Ministerios towards Aranjuez
Fuencarral towards Alcobendas-San Sebastián de los Reyes or Colmenar Viejo	C-4	Nuevos Ministerios towards Parla
Ramón y Cajal towards Príncipe Pío	C-7	Nuevos Ministerios towards Alcalá de Henares
Ramón y Cajal towards Santa María de la Alameda or Cercedilla	C-8	Nuevos Ministerios towards Guadalajara
Terminus	C-10	Nuevos Ministerios towards Villalba

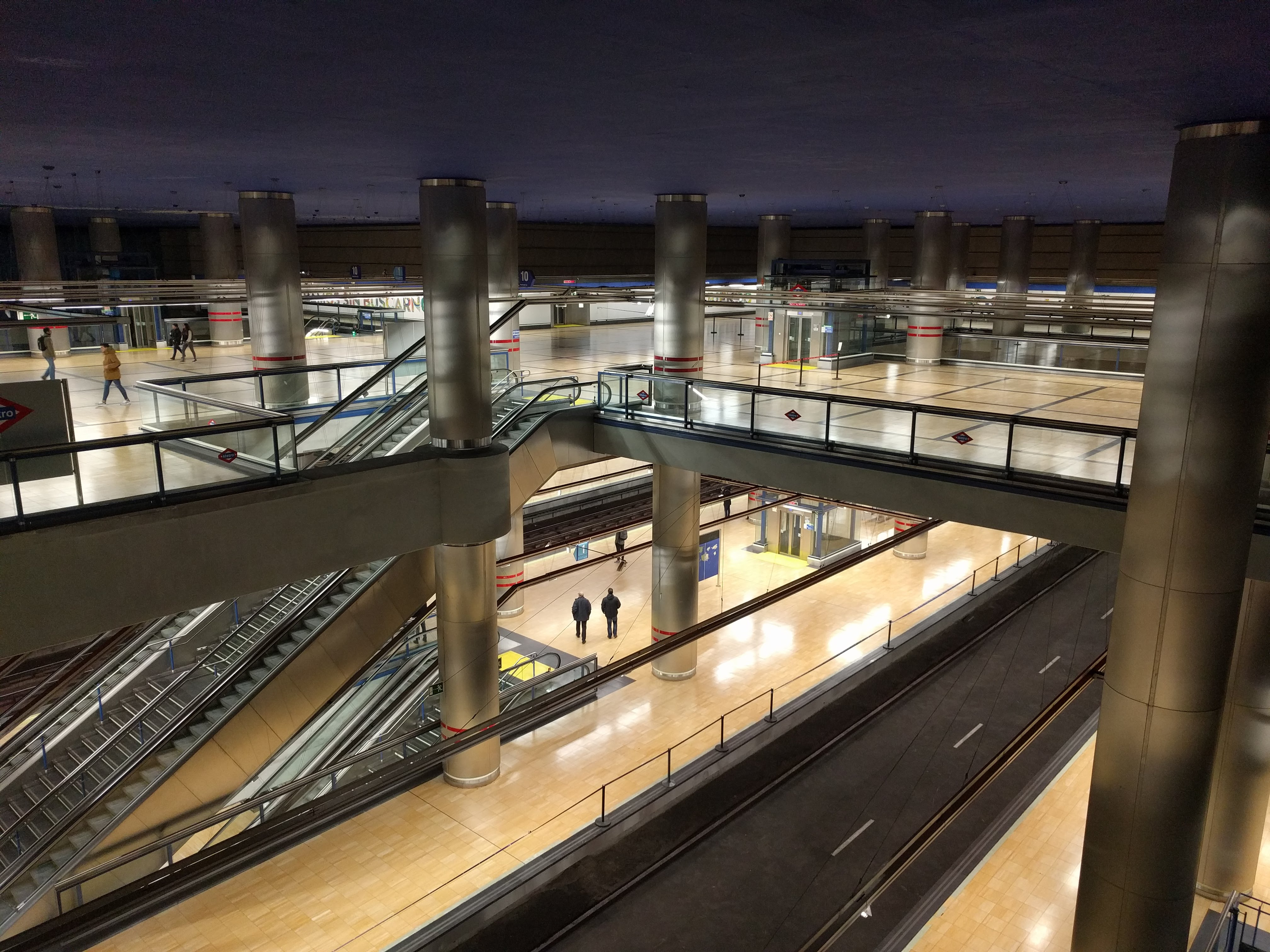
Upper levels of the Chamartín Metro station

== Metro Station ==
The Chamartín metro station connects Lines 1 and 10, and is located directly below the railway station, accessible by a short sheltered outdoor passage. It has four levels: two mezzanines, and two track levels, with mezzanines between track levels. The upper mezzanine has a few shops and fare gates to enter the station proper, and is connected to the exit. The lower mezzanine currently serves as a way for riders to change direction on either line.
