= Cercanías Madrid =

Commuter rail service serving Madrid, Spain

Coordinates: 40.4189°N 3.6919°W

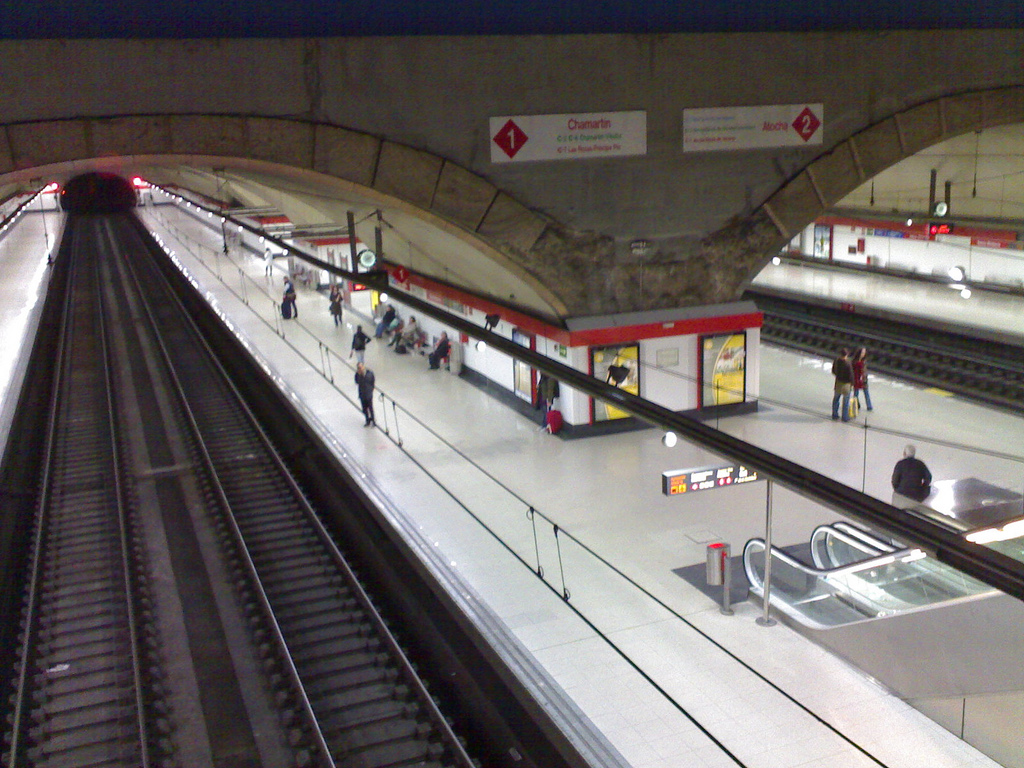
- Cercanías platforms at Nuevos Ministerios Station

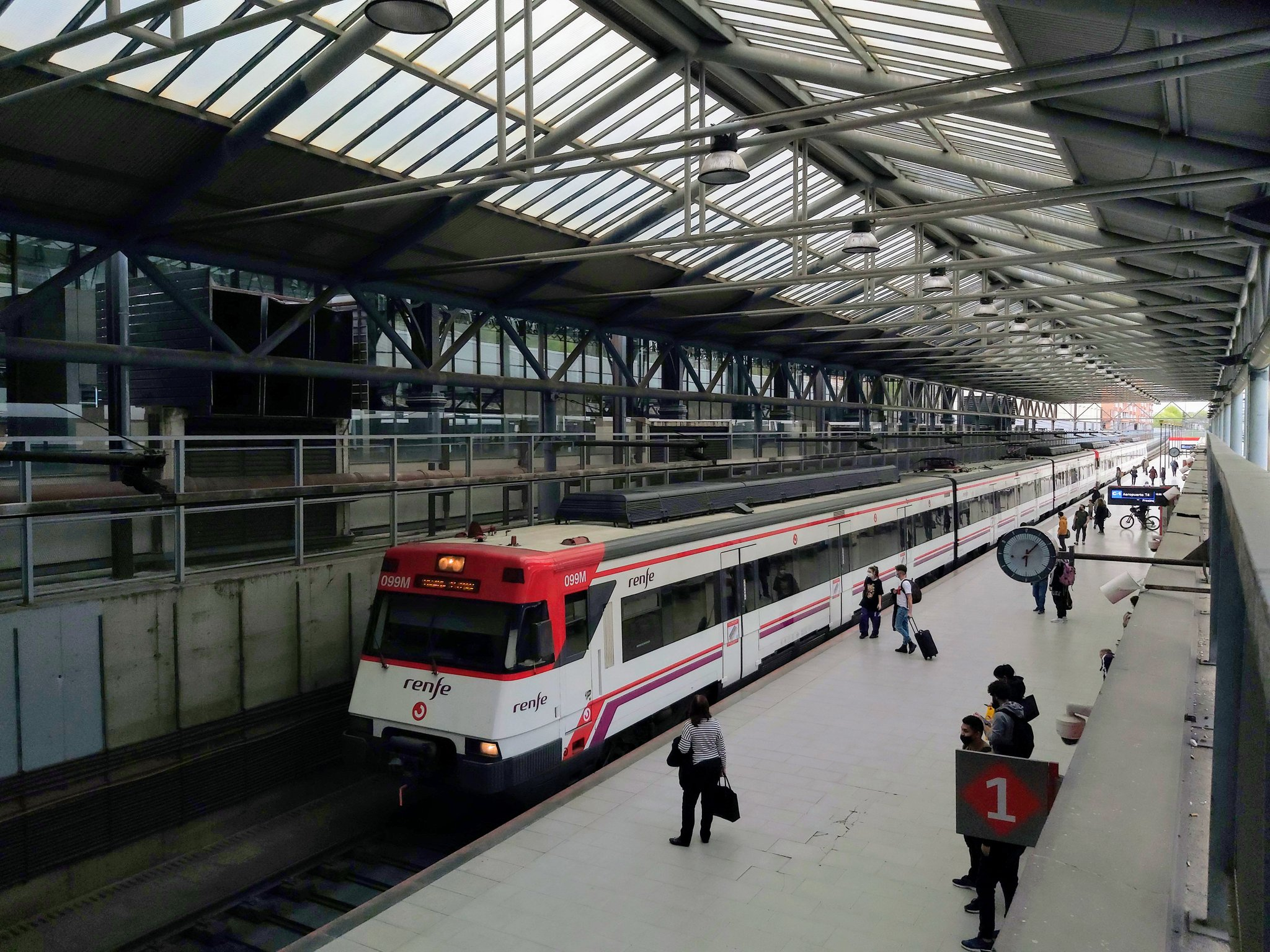

Overview
- Owner: Adif
- Locale: Community of Madrid, parts of Segovia Province and Guadalajara Province
- Transit type: Commuter rail
- Number of lines: 10
- Number of stations: 90
- Daily ridership: 880,000

Operation
- Began operation: 1975; 51 years ago (First section opened in 1851; 175 years ago)
- Operator: Renfe Operadora
- Number of vehicles: Class 442, 446, 447, 450, Civia
- Headway: 3-4 minutes (central segment)

Technical
- System length: 370 km (230 mi)
- Track gauge: 1,000 mm (3 ft 3 3/8 in) metre gauge (line C-9); 1,668 mm (5 ft 5 21/32 in) Iberian gauge (all other lines)
- Top speed: 120 km/h (75 mph)

Cercanías Madrid is the commuter rail service that serves Madrid, the capital of Spain, and its metropolitan area since 1989. It is operated by Cercanías Renfe, the commuter rail division of Renfe, the former monopoly of rail services in Spain. Its total length is 370 km.

== History ==
=== Until 1989 ===
The first railroad line departing from Madrid (the second in Spain and the third in the Iberian Peninsula) was built in 1851 between Madrid and Aranjuez. Soon the growing Spanish railway system was dominated by two large companies: the Compañía del Norte (Northern Company), who operated the lines between Madrid and the Atlantic North of Spain from the Estación del Norte (now Príncipe Pío), the Madrid, Zaragoza and Alicante railway (MZA) who operated the lines between the capital and the Mediterranean and Andalusian cities from the Atocha station. Another station, Delicias, served the line to Lisbon. Other smaller companies operated from Madrid, mostly in narrow gauge. After the Civil War, in 1941, the ailing railway companies were nationalised and joined in the new RENFE, and the narrow gauge lines were progressively closed, the last one in 1970. Almost at the same time, the new Chamartín station was built and all services were transferred to the main stations: Chamartín for the north and east-bound and the international services and Atocha for the south and west-bound trains. Both stations were linked by a tunnel, the Connection Railway Line (Línea de Enlaces Ferroviarios, a line to link the MZA lines with the Norte lines; the building started during the Second Republic and was only finished in 1967. The delays gave the tunnel the nickname of Túnel de la risa ("Tunnel of Laughter" (es)), after a fairground attraction very popular in the 1930s. The introduction of the RENFE 440 series trains in Madrid on two commuter lines in 1975 is considered to be the beginning of the modern Cercanías Madrid network.

The development of the towns around Madrid as bedroom communities only started in the late 1960s, in two different parts of the metropolitan area:

==== The Henares Corridor ====
The main Madrid-Zaragoza-Barcelona line followed the valley of the Henares river, going through the important town of Alcalá de Henares to Guadalajara and Zaragoza. The towns around the line (Coslada, San Fernando de Henares, Torrejón de Ardoz, Alcalá itself) and some suburbs within the city of Madrid (Vallecas Villa, Vicálvaro) started to grow large bedroom communities, which relied heavily in the railway for commuting to Madrid.

==== The South-Southwestern Area ====
At the same time, the former rural towns of Alcorcón, Móstoles, Leganés, Fuenlabrada and Getafe (and some others) started to grow as bedroom communities. These bedroom communities were less rail-oriented and relied more in bus services and private transportation, but soon the rail services were enlarged: in the Madrid-Toledo line for the towns of Getafe and Parla, in the Madrid-Talavera de la Reina line for Leganés and Fuenlabrada, and in 1976 a wide Iberian gauge line between Madrid and Móstoles was built, substituting the narrow gauge line closed in 1970.

At this time, the services were full part of the normal RENFE services, and the cars and stations had the standard livery of the rest of the company. In the 1980s, services started to operate between Madrid-Chamartín and the new town of Tres Cantos, serving also the Autonomous University of Madrid campus, in Cantoblanco.

=== From 1989 to 2008 ===
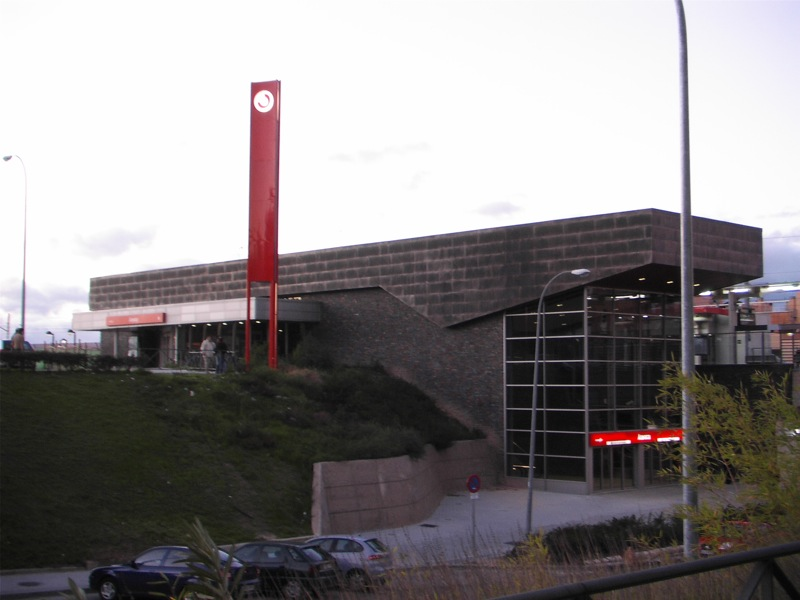
Aravaca station

In 1989, RENFE divided its services in business areas (áreas de negocio), each one with its own symbols and livery. The gold and blue colors were substituted by the red, white and gray colors of the new Cercanías brand and new network maps were made, where the lines were numbered: clockwise from the north, from Madrid to:

1. Cantoblanco (later extended to Colmenar Viejo)
2. Guadalajara
3. Aranjuez
4. Parla
5. Fuenlabrada
6. Móstoles
7. Las Rozas (then returning to Madrid)
8. El Escorial/Cercedilla
9. Cotos

In 1991, the tunnel passing through Madrid linking the C-5 and the C-6 was finished, disbanding the C-6 into a new suburb-to-suburb C-5.

At the same time, a shift was appreciated in the Metropolitan Madrid area growth; the new housing initiatives moved from the northeast and southwest part of the region to the northwest. RENFE then started an ambitious plan of growth of the Cercanías network: upgrading the 19th-century link from the decaying Norte station, now renamed Príncipe Pío, to the Atocha station, through the former industrial districts just south the Madrid downtown, burying it underground from Príncipe Pío to Delicias. This project, called the Pasillo Verde (Green Corridor), also created new streets (namely the Vallejo-Nájera Boulevard and the Imperial Boulevard) and housing projects. In 1996, the Pasillo Verde was finished. A new line, the C-10, was started linking Collado Villalba to Atocha Station through the Green Corridor.

In 2000, the line C-1 was extended to the towns of Alcobendas and San Sebastián de los Reyes, relieving the heavy road traffic between these towns and Madrid. In 2003, the C-7 line was extended to Colmenar Viejo, and in 2004, the C-5 to Humanes. Both extensions were ardently sought, because both cities were already linked by railroad to Madrid, so a Cercanías service was considered logical. The company also developed the so-called CIVIS services, linking important stations non-stop with downtown Madrid (see below at CIVIS).

==== The 11 March 2004 attacks ====
The 11 March 2004 attacks occurred in four trains circulating by the Madrid-Alcalá-Guadalajara-Zaragoza line. One of the trains was a double-decker 450 series which served the C-2 line coming from Guadalajara to Chamartín; the other three were 446 series who departed from Alcalá de Henares: two serving the C-1 line to Alcobendas and one serving the C-7 line, finishing in Príncipe Pío. After the attacks, services were reintroduced the following day, with RENFE private security reinforced. Security measures and design of the rolling stock have been accredited to having notably reduced the number of casualties in the attacks.

=== From 2008 on ===
In 2008, the opening of the second north-south rail tunnel through Madrid allowed the C-3, from Aranjuez, and the C-4, from Parla, which used to finish at Atocha, to continue their route further to the north, the C-3 to El Escorial, and the C-4 to Alcobendas-San Sebastián de los Reyes or Colmenar Viejo alternatingly, passing through Madrid. The next year, the rail station of Puerta del Sol in downtown Madrid, part of this second tunnel, was inaugurated. The old C-1 line was absorbed into the C-4 and until 2011 there was no C-1 line, when it was revived as the railway to the Madrid-Barajas Airport was inaugurated.

Since 2011 no new lines have been enacted, and the link to the Parque Warner Madrid theme park was closed because of lack of use. The improvements have consisted of insertion of new stations in the existing lines and further connections to the Madrid Metro, such as the access from the Sol rail station to the Gran Vía Street, opened in 2021.

== Lines ==
Nine lines serve the Cercanías network. There are three kinds of lines:

Suburb-to-Madrid lines
These lines make a direct link between the suburbs with downtown Madrid: lines C-2, C-3, C-7, and C-10.

Suburb-to-suburb lines, passing through Madrid
These lines link two suburbs, but most passengers only go from one of the suburbs to Madrid or vice versa; indeed, some of these lines have special services suburb-to-Madrid only, especially during rush hour, early mornings or late nights. Suburb-to-suburb lines are the C-4, C-5 and C-8.

Intra-city line
C-1, only runs through the city of Madrid from Chamartín to the Madrid Airport.

Tourist line
C-9, from the village of Cercedilla (terminus of C-8) to the ski resorts of Navacerrada Pass and Cotos. Only runs from December to March.

†	Suspended line

Cercanías Madrid commuter rail service lines (as of 23 December 2024)
Line	Route	No. of stations	Length
	Chamartín – Aeropuerto T4	4	4.6 km 2.9 mi
	Chamartín – Atocha – Alcalá de Henares – Guadalajara	19	65 km 40.6 mi
	Chamartín – Atocha – Aranjuez	24	106.5 km 66.3 mi
	Alcobendas-San Sebastián de los Reyes/Colmenar Viejo – Chamartín – Atocha – Parla	18	62.2 km 38.1 mi
	Móstoles-El Soto – Atocha – Humanes	23	45 km 27.1 mi
	Príncipe Pío – Las Rozas – Chamartín – Atocha – Alcalá de Henares	24	97 km 60.4 mi
	Santa María de la Alameda – El Escorial – Villalba – Chamartín – Atocha – Alcalá de Henares – Guadalajara	33	135 km 83.1 mi
	Cercedilla – Villalba – Chamartín – Atocha – Alcalá de Henares – Guadalajara	32	135 km 83.1 mi
	Cercedilla – Cotos	3	18.2 km 11.5 mi
	Villalba - Príncipe Pío – Atocha – Chamartín	18	67 km 41.6 mi

It can be argued that lines C-2 and C-8 are the same line, as usually the trains who finish C-8 line in Atocha will follow line C-2 to Guadalajara and vice versa; indeed, a C-2 train will be signed El Escorial or Cercedilla rather than Chamartín, and a C-8 train will rather be signed Guadalajara than Atocha.

There is no line C-6 because it was combined with line C-5.

In 2004 construction was begun on a second central line to link Atocha and Chamartín, to relieve the heavy traffic in the old tunnel (built during the 1930s and 1940s, when materials were scarce and poor). Opening on July 9, 2008, it included a new station at Sol of the Metro where trains stop instead of at Recoletos on the old line. The tunnel is now in use by the C-3 and C-4.

== Operation ==
=== Operating times ===
Rather strangely for such a night-living city as Madrid, trains do not operate late at night, mostly for union and safety reasons. The first train to operate on weekdays is the 5:07 C-5 train from Móstoles/El Soto; the rest of the lines (except C-9) start to operate around 5:30 am. Line C-9, being a branch line located far away from central Madrid in the Sierra de Guadarrama, operates from 9:30 am to 10:30 pm.

The frequency of the trains depends on the size of the towns served and the traffic on the line. The central section of the network, from Atocha to Chamartín, through Recoletos and Nuevos Ministerios, has trains every 3–4 minutes (of various lines) on weekday peak hours; the farther branches of the C-8 line have trains every two hours on weekends.

All lines (except C-9) finish their operations around midnight.

=== Rolling stock ===
There are basically three series of trains operating in the Madrid Cercanías network:

446 series
built from 1989 on, these are the most usual cars in the network, together with 447 series. They are used for almost all lines. Their maximum speed is 100 km/h and can carry 704 passengers (204 seated) in each three cars. They use an AdTranz Propulsion & Control System, with CAF bogies and carbody.

447 series
built from 1993 on. Their maximum speed is 120 km/h and can carry 704 passengers (204 seated) in each three cars. They use a Siemens Propulsion & Control System, with CAF bogies and carbody.

450 series
the double-decker 450 series were built from 1990 on. Apart from the double deck, they are different from the other series in their almost all-seat configuration. They are mostly used on the C-2/C-8 and the C-1 line. Their maximum speed is 140 km/h and they can carry 1840 passengers (1008 seated).

They are also new modular and moderns trains, called Civia (462, 463, 464 or 465 series). They share the same design, the series number depending on the number of coaches, with a minimum of 2 and a maximum of 5 coaches. They have been designed as a replacement for the old 440/440R series in the CIVIS services. In Madrid there are only 465 series.

The 446 and 447 series trains can serve in two composition: a single composition of three cars (called tren corto or short train) and a double composition of six cars (called tren largo or long train) As the double composition is the most usual, when a service is operated by a single composition it is announced previously.

=== Tickets ===
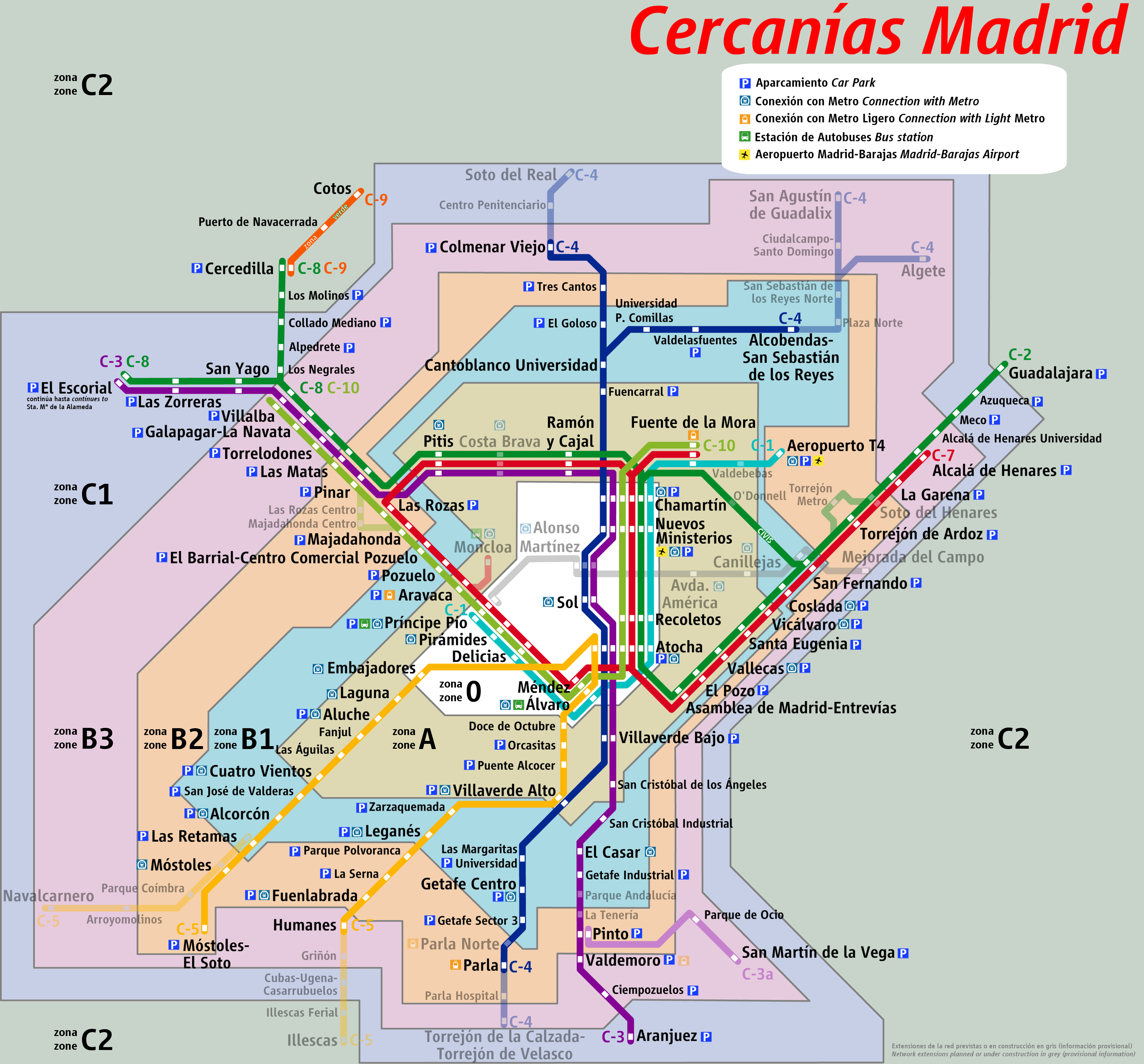
Zones in operation on the Cercanías Madrid, as of 2011

Cercanias is part of the Madrid Regional Transport Consortium (Consorcio Regional de Transportes de Madrid) and follows its zoning system, based in concentric zones around Madrid. The price of the trips inside the network depends on the number of zones crossed.

Prices of one single trip ticket, in euro as of April 2015:

Zones	1 or 2	3	4	5	6	7	Green
Price	1.70	1.85	2.60	3.40	4.05	5.50	8.70

There is also the bonotren, that allows ten trips (prices range from € 5.65 to 26.20) and the abono mensual that allows two trips a day during a natural month (prices range from € 20.00 to 70.00) The abono mensual should not be confused with the Abono Transportes, which allows the use of the entire transport network – not just trains.

=== CIVIS ===
CIVIS is a special service which operates on some lines: first on C-10 and C-3, and later on C-2. The CIVIS services uses the direct railway line between Chamartín and San Fernando without stopping and thus provides faster through service to San Fernando and stations beyond.

== Development plans ==
As Renfe is (at the moment) a constituent of the Spanish Ministry of Infrastructure, and national infrastructure development projects during the last ten years have focused on the development of the Spanish high speed network, funding for new lines has been scarce and growth has been slow (in comparison with the rocket-paced growth of the Madrid Metro).

As the Cercanías network is the only public transportation system in Madrid which is owned by the Spanish central state (in comparison with the Metro and bus services, owned regionally, municipally and privately) this difference has been exploited politically. A harsh debate between the Madrid regional government (which operates the Metro) and the central government (which operates the Cercanías) about who is responsible for building the line to the new terminal of the Barajas Airport delayed the construction of any rail link. The Madrid Metro Line 8 extension to Terminal 4 opened in May 2007, while the Cercanías link did not open until 2011.

== See also ==
- Madrid Metro
- Renfe
- Commuter rail
- Elektrichka
- S-Bahn
- Réseau Express Régional
- Transportation in Spain
