= Puerta de Arganda (Madrid Metro) =

Madrid Metro station

- Platform of the metro station

General information
- Location: Vicálvaro, Madrid; Spain
- Coordinates: 40.4013157°N 3.5959768°W
- System: Madrid Metro station
- Owner: CRTM
- Operator: CRTM

Construction
- Accessible: yes

Other information
- Fare zone: A

History
- Opened: 1 December 1998; 27 years ago

Services
Preceding station	Madrid Metro	Following station
San Cipriano towards Paco de Lucía	Line 9	Rivas Urbanizaciones towards Arganda del Rey
Out of system interchange
Preceding station	Cercanías Madrid	Following station
Coslada towards Chamartín	C-2	Santa Eugenia towards Guadalajara
Coslada towards Príncipe Pío	C-7	Santa Eugenia towards Alcalá de Henares
Coslada towards Santa María de la Alameda or Cercedilla	C-8	Santa Eugenia towards Guadalajara
Location
- Location within Madrid

Puerta de Arganda [ˈpweɾta ðe aɾˈɣanda] is a station of the Metro Madrid. It is located in fare Zone A of the CRTM.

Due to it being the southern endpoint of Line 9A, it serves as an interchange station to both Line 9B towards Rivas-Vaciamadrid and Arganda del Rey and via Vicálvaro railway station to the Cercanías service (lines C-2, C-7 and C-8. Connecting bus lines include 4, 71, 100, E3, T23 and the night line N7.

The name of the above-ground Cercanías station is Vicálvaro instead of Puerta de Arganda, although there also is a distinct Metro Vicálvaro.

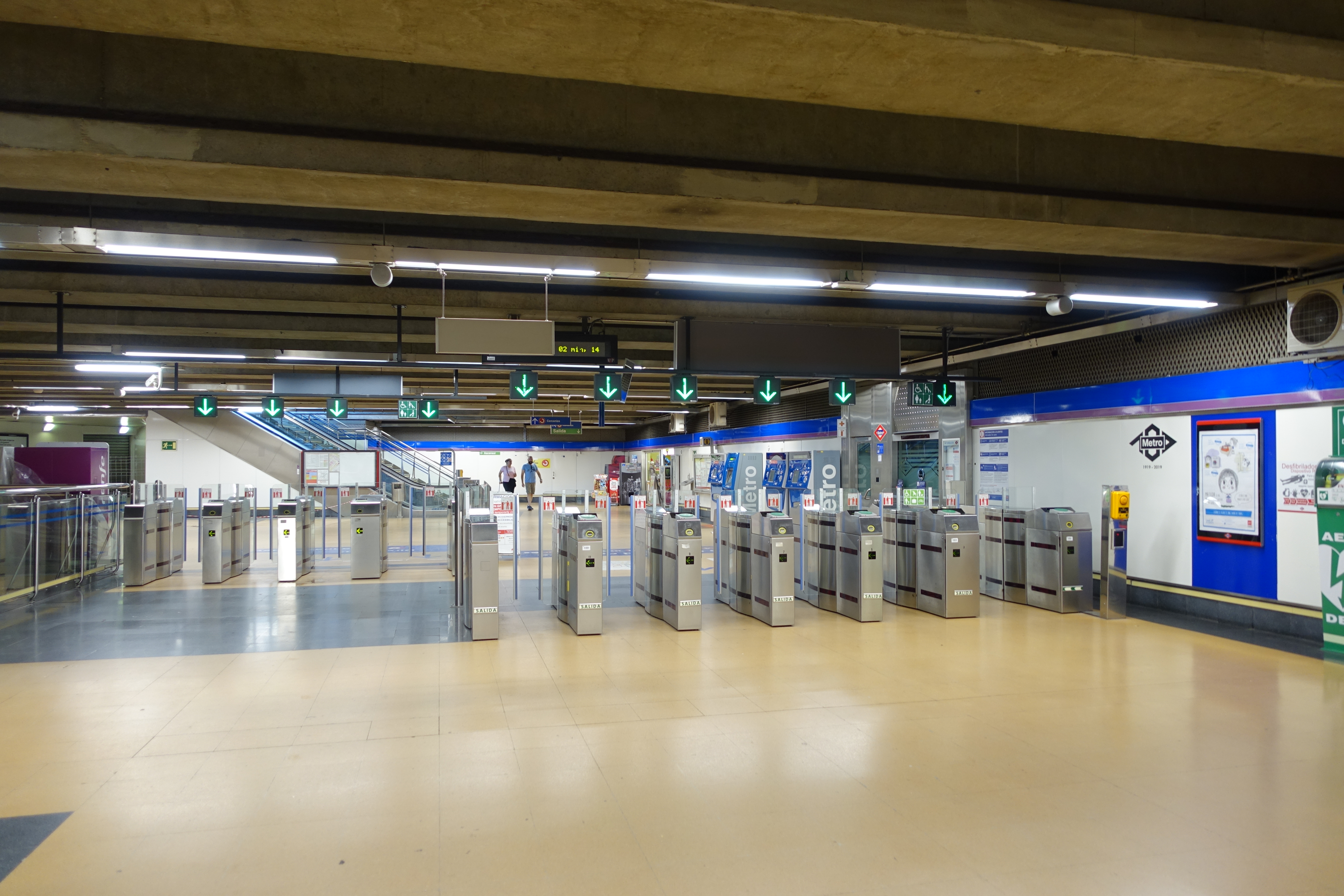
Travellers will have to validate their tickets once more upon leaving the station

== History ==
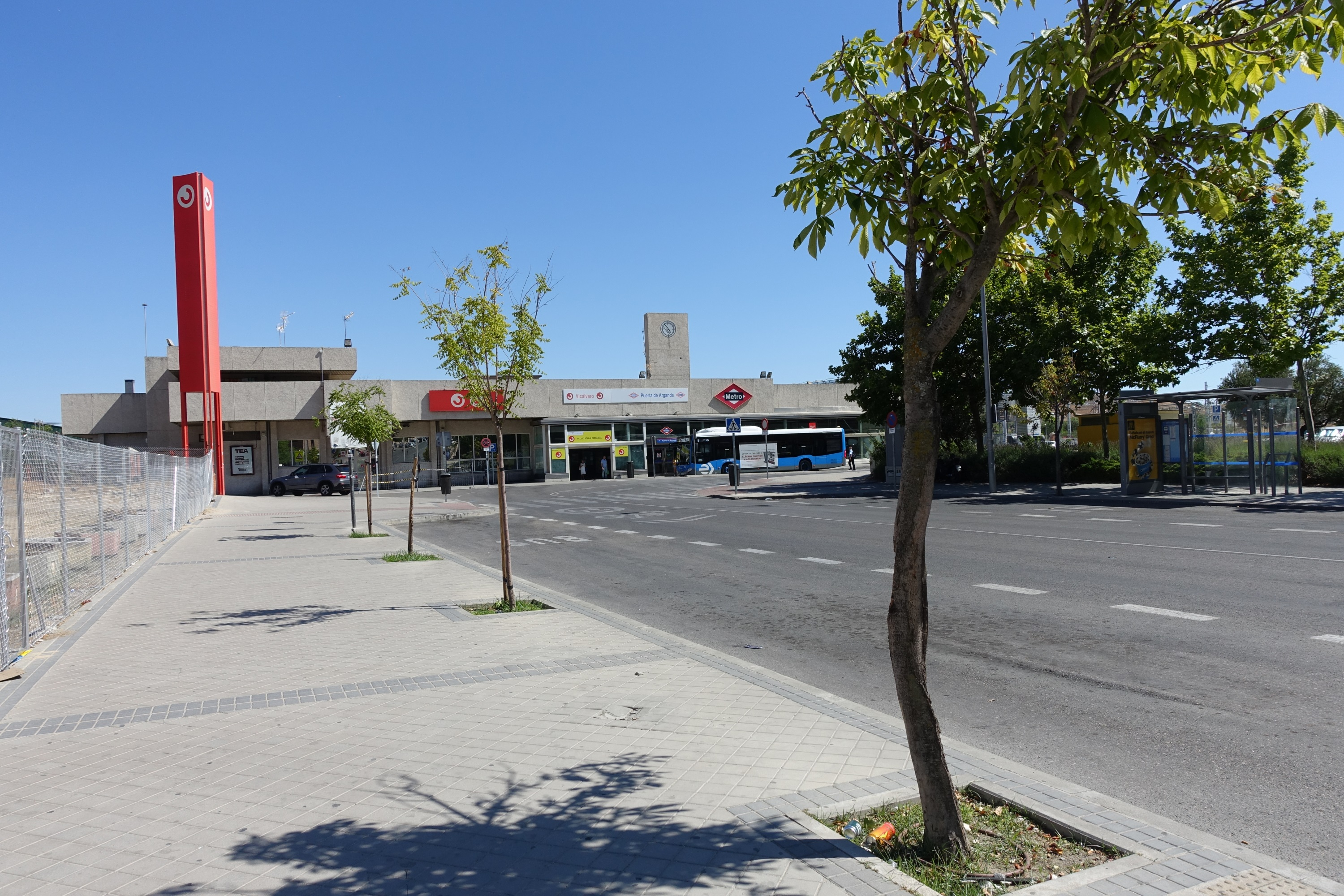
Train station Vicálvaro and Metro Puerta de Arganda

The underground metro station was opened to the public on 1 December 1998, when line 9 was extended to the south, with the remaining section toward Arganda del Rey being inaugurated on 7 April 1999.

During the first few years of operation, one out of every three or four trains from the old terminus Herrera Oria passed through Puerta de Arganda in the direction of Arganda del Rey, with the rest reversing their course, until the CRTM separated the line into two sections, the latter operated under concession by TFM.

The station has two platforms and two tracks with one platform located in the middle to ensure a smooth passage between trains of the two sections.
