= Sainz de Baranda (Madrid Metro) =

Madrid Metro station

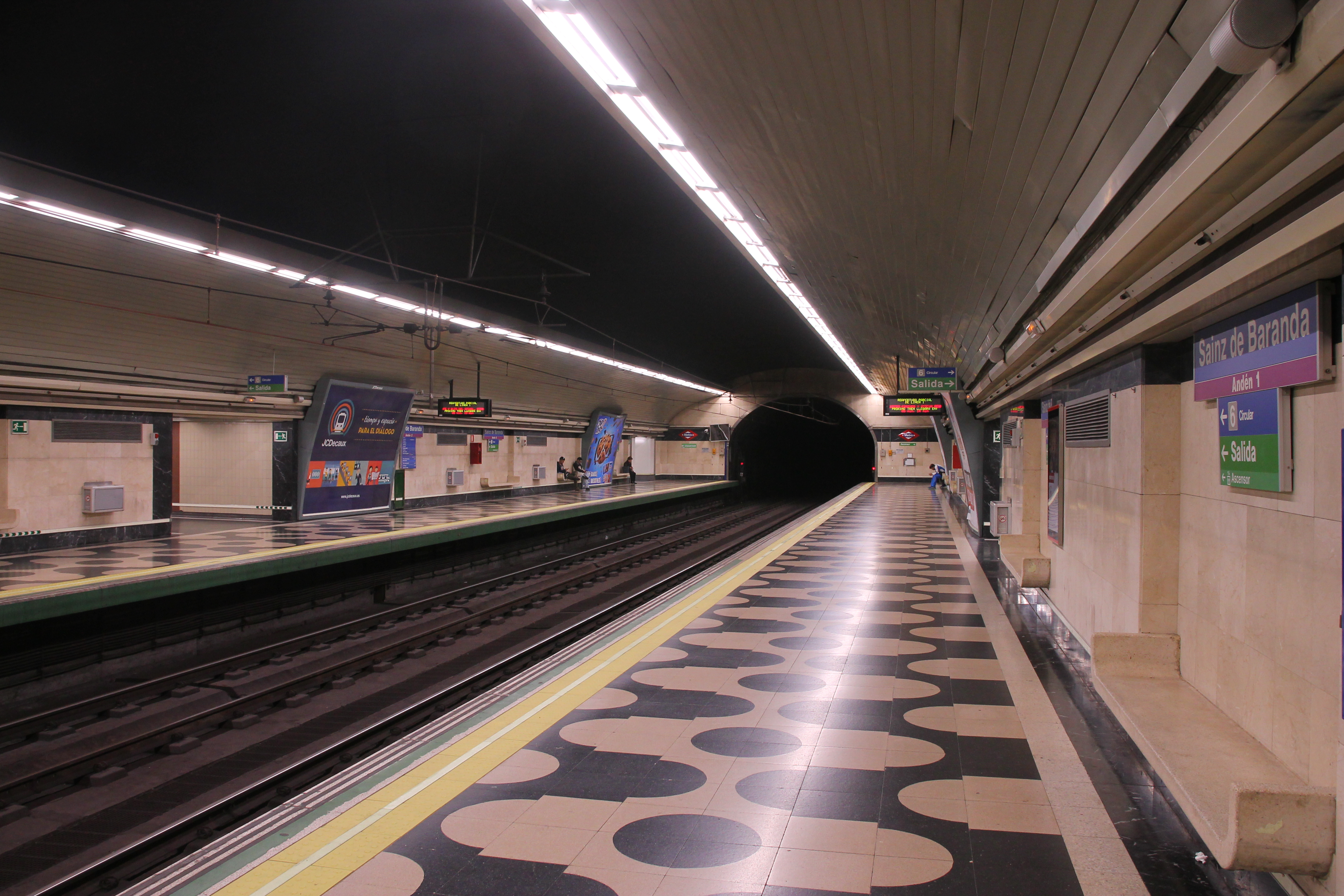
- Sainz de Baranda station platforms

General information
- Location: Retiro, Madrid; Spain
- Coordinates: 40.4150675°N 3.6695171°W
- System: Madrid Metro station
- Owner: CRTM
- Operator: CRTM
- Line: 9

Construction
- Accessible: yes

Other information
- Fare zone: A

History
- Opened: 11 October 1979

Services
Preceding station	Madrid Metro	Following station
Conde de Casal clockwise / outer	Line 6	O'Donnell anticlockwise / inner
Ibiza towards Paco de Lucía	Line 9	Estrella towards Arganda del Rey
Location
- Location within Madrid

Sainz de Baranda [ˈsajnθ ðe βaˈɾanda] is a station on Line 6 and Line 9 of the Madrid Metro, located at the intersection of Doctor Esquerdo and Alcalde Sainz de Baranda streets in the Retiro district in Madrid, Spain. It is located in fare Zone A. The station is named after the street, which in turn is named after the first mayor of Madrid, Pedro Sainz de Baranda.

The station opened on 10 October 1979 when the first section of Line 6 was inaugurated. On 31 January 1980, the first section of Line 9 was opened from Pavones to Sainz de Baranda, where it connected to the rest of the Madrid Metro network. It ceased to be a terminus station when Line 9 was extended to Avenida de América on 24 February 1986.
