= Vinateros (Madrid Metro) =

Madrid Metro station

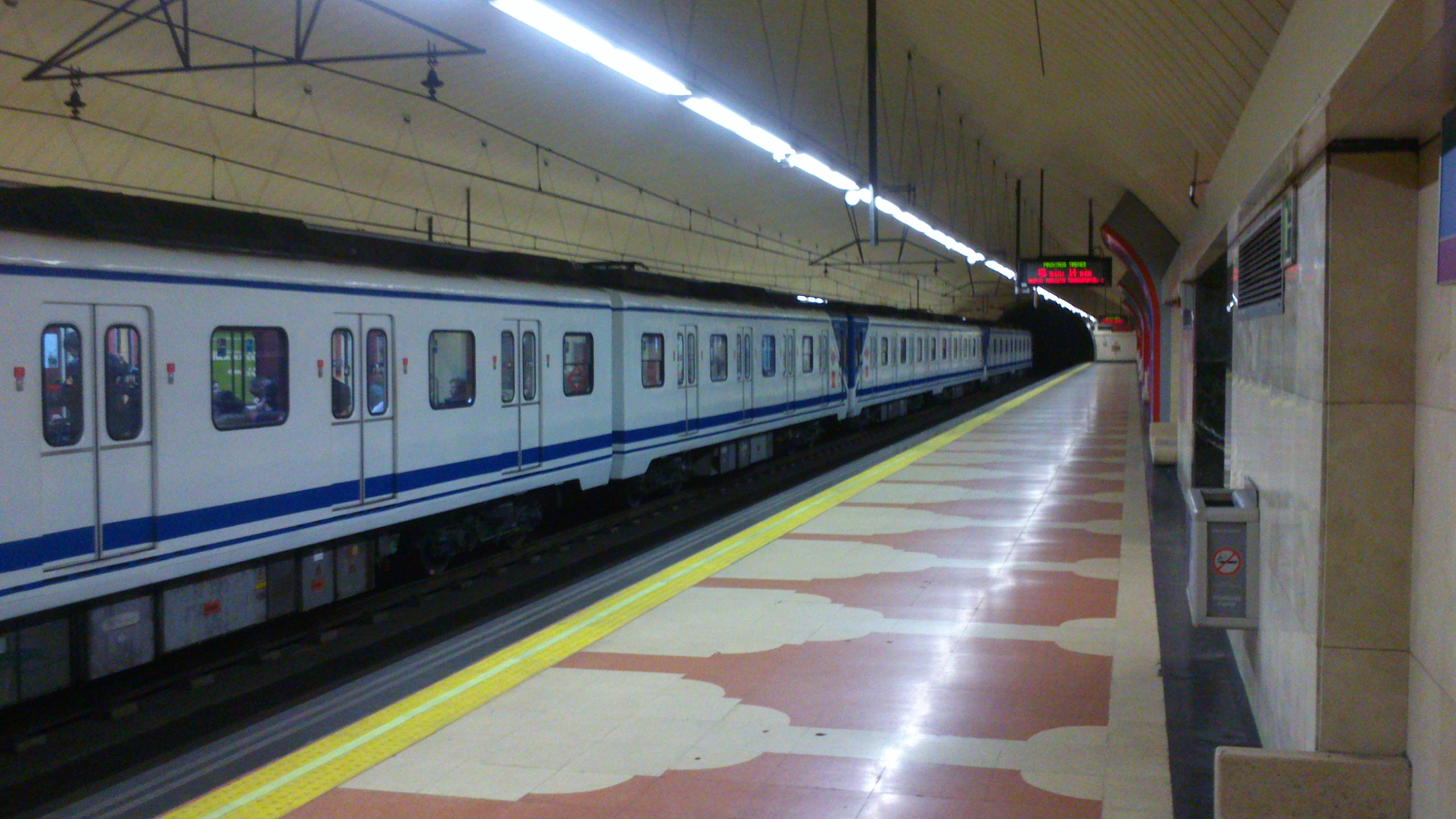

General information
- Location: Moratalaz, Madrid; Spain
- Coordinates: 40.4102443°N 3.6527335°W
- System: Madrid Metro station
- Owner: CRTM
- Operator: CRTM

Construction
- Accessible: No

Other information
- Fare zone: A

History
- Opened: 31 January 1980; 46 years ago

Services
Preceding station	Madrid Metro	Following station
Estrella towards Paco de Lucía	Line 9	Artilleros towards Arganda del Rey
Location
- Location within Madrid

Vinateros [binaˈteɾos] is a station on Line 9 of the Madrid Metro, serving the Vinateros barrio. It is located in fare Zone A.
