= San Cipriano (Madrid Metro) =

Madrid Metro station

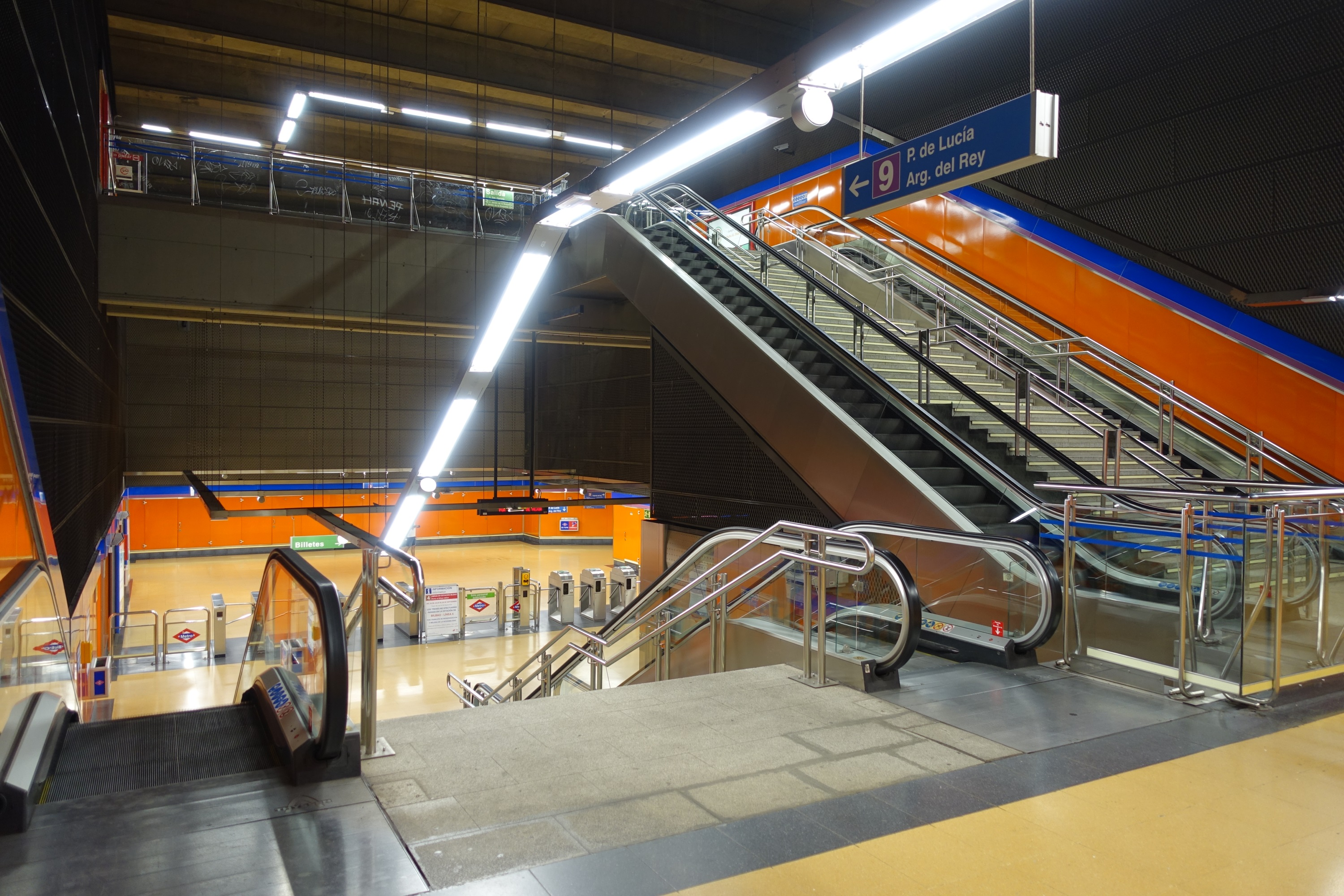

General information
- Location: Vicálvaro, Madrid; Spain
- Coordinates: 40.4038141°N 3.6023979°W
- System: Madrid Metro station
- Owner: CRTM
- Operator: CRTM

Construction
- Accessible: yes

Other information
- Fare zone: A

History
- Opened: 1 December 1998; 27 years ago

Services
Preceding station	Madrid Metro	Following station
Vicálvaro towards Paco de Lucía	Line 9	Puerta de Arganda towards Arganda del Rey
Location
- Location within Madrid

San Cipriano [ˈsan θiˈpɾjano] is a station on Line 9 of the Madrid Metro, under the Calle de San Cipriano ("Saint Cyprian's Street"). It is located in fare Zone A.
