= Plaza de Castilla (Madrid Metro) =

Madrid Metro station

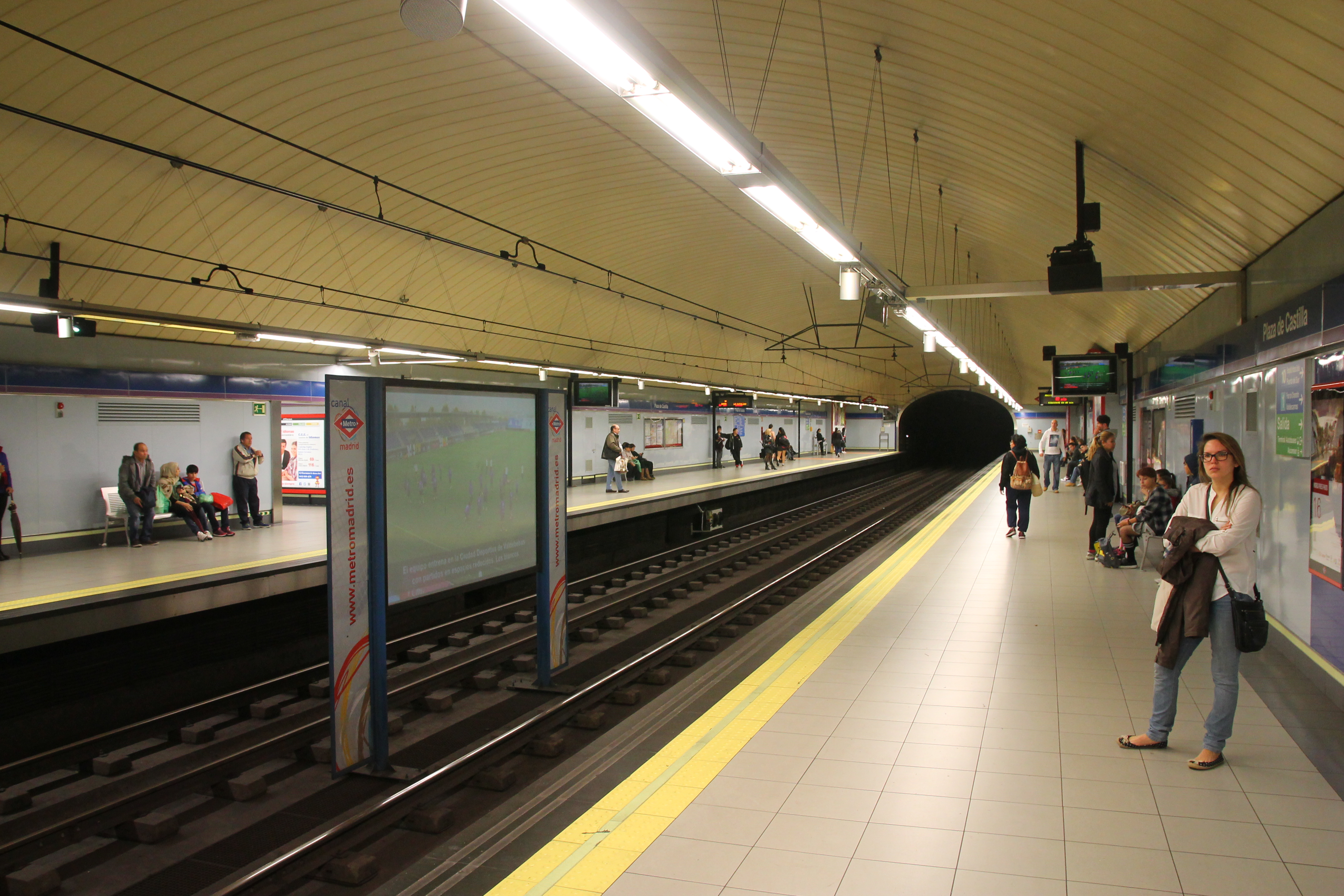
- Platforms of the station of the line 9

General information
- Location: Tetuán / Chamartín, Madrid; Spain
- Coordinates: 40.4668983°N 3.6891989°W
- System: Madrid Metro station
- Owner: CRTM
- Operator: CRTM

Construction
- Structure type: Underground
- Accessible: Yes

Other information
- Fare zone: A

History
- Opened: 4 February 1961; 65 years ago

Services
Preceding station	Madrid Metro	Following station
Chamartín towards Pinar de Chamartín	Line 1	Valdeacederas towards Valdecarros
Ventilla towards Paco de Lucía	Line 9	Duque de Pastrana towards Arganda del Rey
Chamartín towards Hospital Infanta Sofía	Line 10	Cuzco towards Puerta del Sur
Location
- Location within Madrid

Plaza de Castilla [ˈplaθa ðe kasˈtiʝa] is a station on Line 1, Line 9 and Line 10 of the Madrid Metro. It is located in fare Zone A. It is located underneath the square of the same name, on the border between the districts of Tetuán and Chamartín.

In addition to being a metro station, it has an underground bus terminal and correspondence with a large number of bus lines on the surface, which makes Plaza de Castilla one of the top transport interchanges of Madrid.
