= Duque de Pastrana (Madrid Metro) =

Madrid Metro station

- Platforms of the station

General information
- Location: Chamartín, Madrid; Spain
- Coordinates: 40.4676242°N 3.679168°W
- System: Madrid Metro station
- Owner: CRTM
- Operator: CRTM

Construction
- Accessible: yes

Other information
- Fare zone: A

History
- Opened: 30 December 1983; 42 years ago

Services
Preceding station	Madrid Metro	Following station
Plaza de Castilla towards Paco de Lucía	Line 9	Pío XII towards Arganda del Rey
Location
- Location within Madrid

Duque de Pastrana [ˈduke ðe pasˈtɾana] is a station on Line 9 of the Madrid Metro, under the Plaza Duque de Pastrana ("Duke of Pastrana Place"). It is located in fare Zone A.
