= Pío XII (Madrid Metro) =

Madrid Metro station

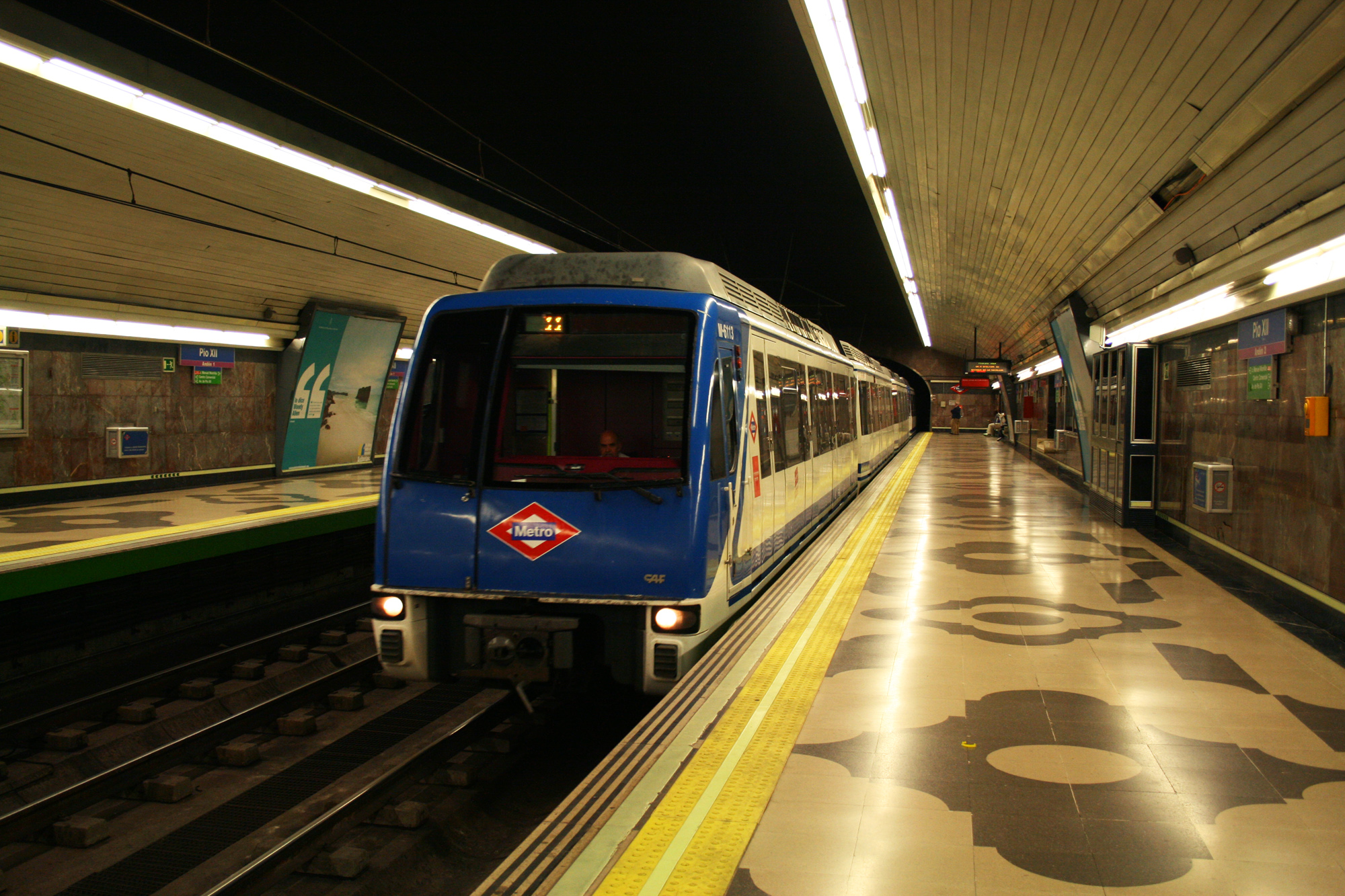

General information
- Location: Chamartín, Madrid; Spain
- Coordinates: 40.4630043°N 3.6757954°W
- System: Madrid Metro station
- Owner: CRTM
- Operator: CRTM

Construction
- Accessible: No

Other information
- Fare zone: A

History
- Opened: 30 December 1983; 42 years ago

Services
Preceding station	Madrid Metro	Following station
Duque de Pastrana towards Paco de Lucía	Line 9	Colombia towards Arganda del Rey
Location
- Location within Madrid

Pío XII [ˈpi.o ˈðoθe] is a station on Line 9 of the Madrid Metro, located under the Avenida de Pío XII ("Pius XII Avenue"). It is in fare Zone A.
