= La Poveda (Madrid Metro) =

Madrid Metro station

- La Poveda

General information
- Location: Arganda del Rey, Madrid; Spain
- Coordinates: 40.3190157°N 3.4774474°W
- System: Madrid Metro station
- Owner: CRTM
- Operator: TFM

Construction
- Accessible: yes

Other information
- Fare zone: B3

History
- Opened: 7 April 1999; 27 years ago

Services
Preceding station	Madrid Metro	Following station
Rivas Vaciamadrid towards Paco de Lucía	Line 9	Arganda del Rey Terminus
Location
- Location within Community of Madrid

La Poveda [la poˈβeða] is a station on Line 9 of the Madrid Metro, serving the La Poveda barrio of Arganda del Rey. It is located in fare Zone B3.
