= Estrella (Madrid Metro) =

Madrid Metro station

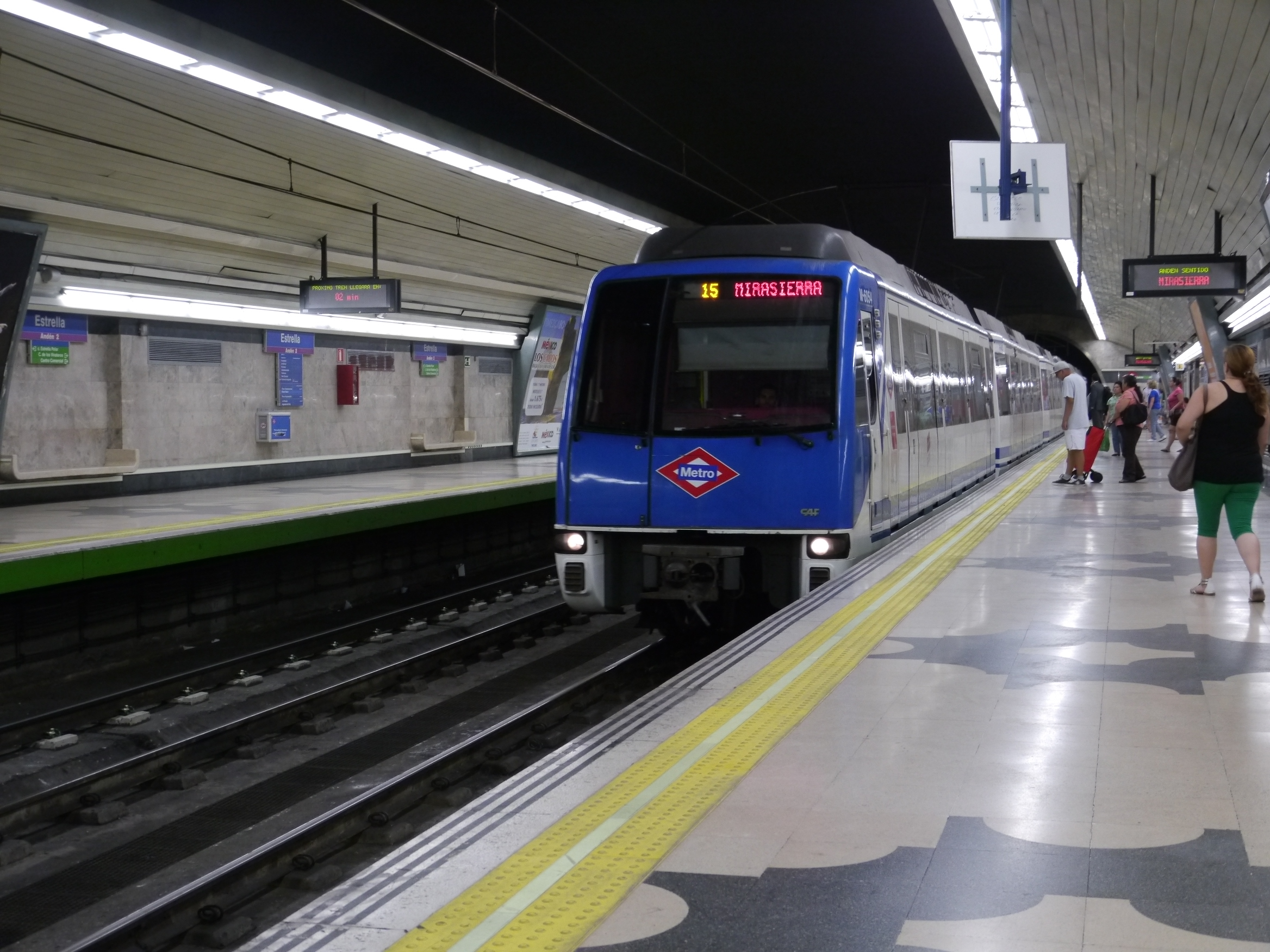

General information
- Location: Moratalaz / Retiro, Madrid; Spain
- Coordinates: 40.4114722°N 3.6617853°W
- System: Madrid Metro station
- Owner: CRTM
- Operator: CRTM

Construction
- Accessible: No

Other information
- Fare zone: A

History
- Opened: 31 January 1980; 46 years ago

Services
Preceding station	Madrid Metro	Following station
Sainz de Baranda towards Paco de Lucía	Line 9	Vinateros towards Arganda del Rey
Location
- Location within Madrid

Estrella [esˈtɾeʝa] is a station on Line 9 of the Madrid Metro, serving the Estrella barrio. It is located in fare Zone A. The station is located directly below the M-30 Autopista (motorway), between the districts of Moratalaz to the east and Retiro to the west, and has entrances on both sides.
