= Rivas Futura (Madrid Metro) =

Madrid Metro station

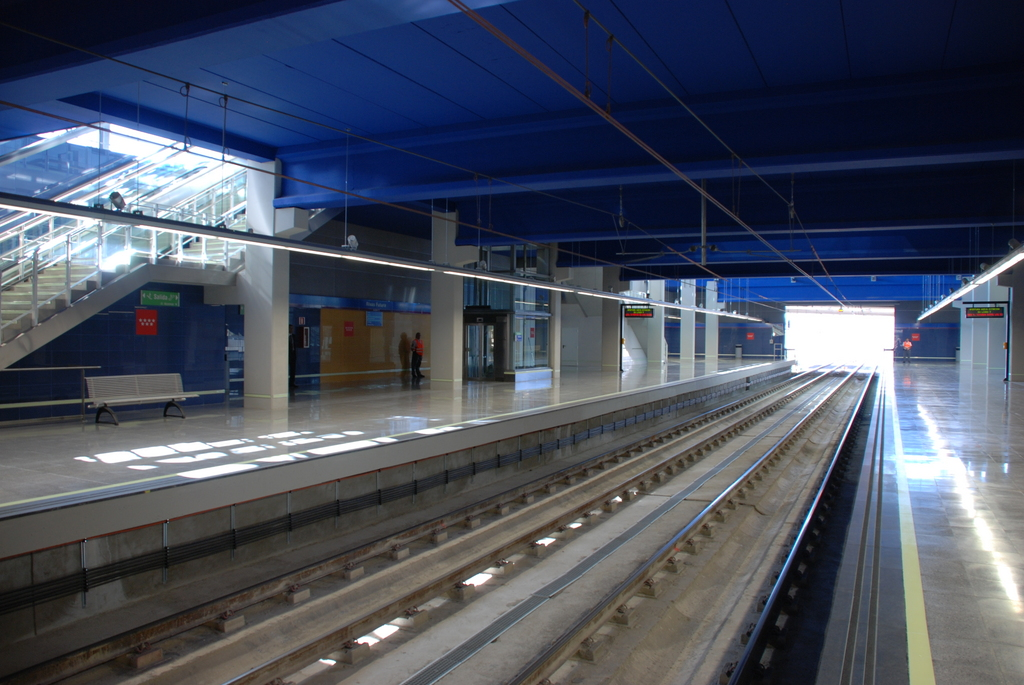

General information
- Location: Rivas-Vaciamadrid, Community of Madrid; Spain
- Coordinates: 40.3416956°N 3.525004°W
- System: Madrid Metro station
- Owner: CRTM
- Operator: TFM

Construction
- Accessible: yes

Other information
- Fare zone: B1

History
- Opened: 11 July 2008; 18 years ago

Services
Preceding station	Madrid Metro	Following station
Rivas Urbanizaciones towards Paco de Lucía	Line 9	Rivas Vaciamadrid towards Arganda del Rey
Location
- Location within Community of Madrid

Rivas Futura [ˈriβas fuˈtuɾa] is a station on Line 9 of the Madrid Metro, serving the Parque Comercial Rivas Futura. It is located in fare Zone B1.
