= Ventilla (Madrid Metro) =

Madrid Metro station

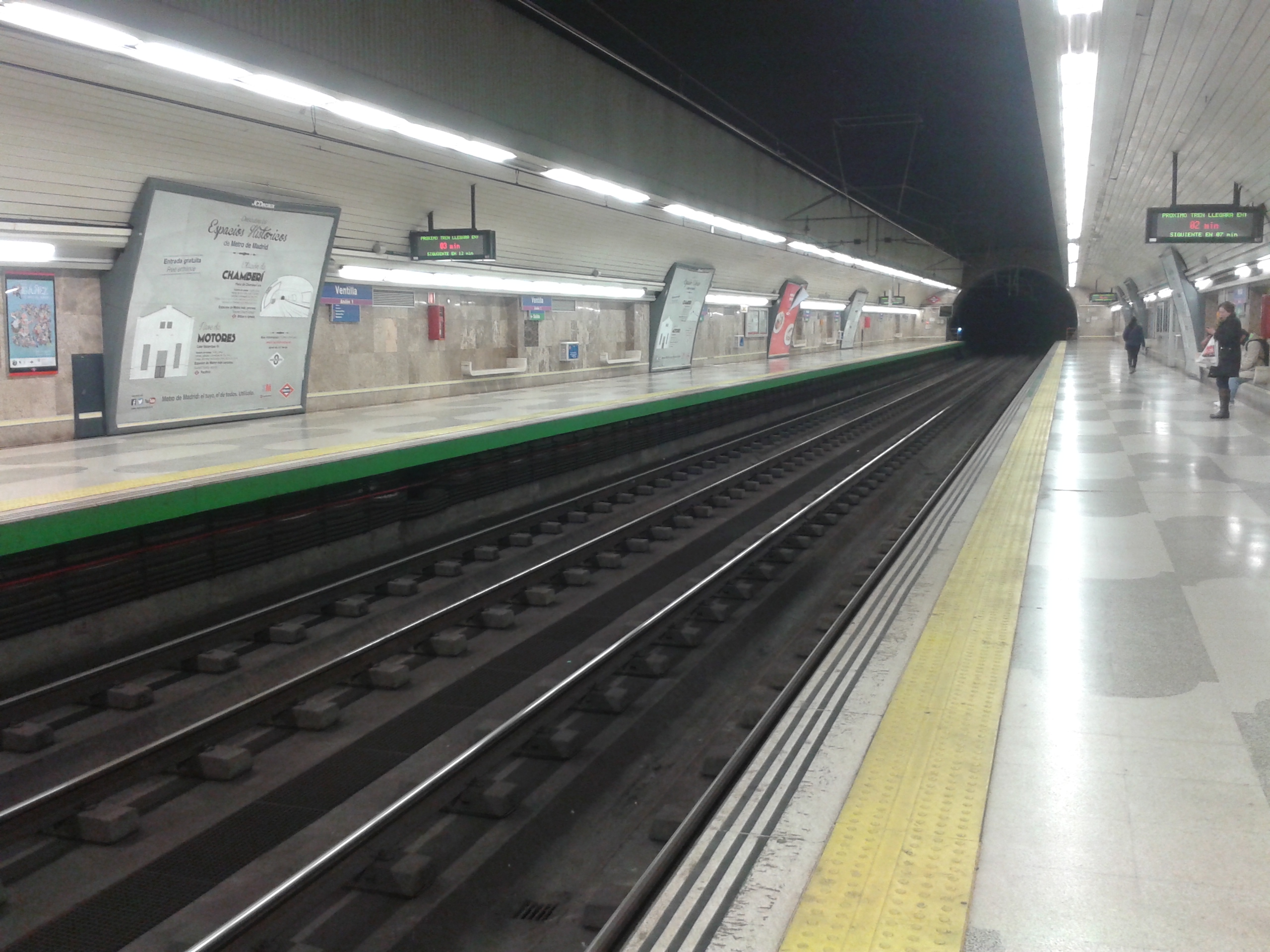

General information
- Location: Tetuán, Madrid; Spain
- Coordinates: 40.4694349°N 3.6958778°W
- System: Madrid Metro station
- Owner: CRTM
- Operator: CRTM

Construction
- Accessible: No

Other information
- Fare zone: A

History
- Opened: 3 June 1983; 43 years ago

Services
Preceding station	Madrid Metro	Following station
Barrio del Pilar towards Paco de Lucía	Line 9	Plaza de Castilla towards Arganda del Rey
Location
- Location within Madrid

Ventilla [benˈtiʝa] is a station on Line 9 of the Madrid Metro, serving the Almenara barrio, commonly known as La Ventilla. It is located in fare Zone A.
