= Line 9 (Madrid Metro) =

Rapid transit line of the Madrid Metro

- A Class 5000 train at Mirasierra station

Overview
- Native name: Línea 9
- Owner: CRTM
- Locale: Madrid
- Termini: Paco de Lucía; Arganda del Rey
- Stations: 29
- Website: metromadrid.es/en/linea/linea-9

Service
- Type: Rapid transit
- System: Madrid Metro
- Operator: CRTM
- Rolling stock: CAF 5000, 6000; AnsaldoBreda 7000, 9000

History
- Opened: 31 January 1980; 46 years ago
- Last extension: 2015

Technical
- Line length: 39.5 km (24.5 mi)
- Character: Underground
- Track gauge: 1,445 mm (4 ft 8 7/8 in)

Line 9 of the Madrid Metro is a rapid transit line in Madrid that runs between Paco de Lucía to Arganda del Rey. The line originally opened on 31 January 1980 between Sainz de Baranda and Pavones. Later it was extended from Avenida de América to Herrera Oria on 3 June 1983, though this section was at the time separate from the original part until the missing fragment from Avenida de América to Sainz de Baranda was opened on 24 February 1986.

== History ==
On 1 December 1998, the line was extended from Pavones to Puerta de Arganda. The stations in this section were marked with a unique wall color in each station, making it easy to spot one's destination from the train. For example, Pavones is white, Valdebernardo is yellow, Vicálvaro is a light shade of turquoise, and San Cipriano is orange. This approach is being applied in many other new or recently refurbished stations like Sevilla on Line 2, though there is no representation of the colours on official system maps.

On 11 July 2008, the infill station Rivas Futura opened, located between Rivas-Urbanizaciones and Rivas Vaciamadrid.

On 28 March 2011, the line was extended north from Herrera Oria to Mirasierra. On 25 March 2015 the line was extended further north to Paco de Lucía. Originally, this station was to be named Costa Brava, but because musician and guitarist Paco de Lucía died in 2014, the Transport Authorities decided to change its name to pay tribute. A Cercanías railway station opened on 5 February 2018, providing a connection between the two rail systems.

=== Line 9B ===
At Puerta de Arganda, an island platform was built, so passengers who required to use the southern extension ("line 9B") can move directly across the platform to from the primary route ("line 9A"). This southern extension runs through mostly unpopulated areas connecting the two towns of Rivas-Vaciamadrid and Arganda del Rey. The line runs with only two or three car trains at comparatively long intervals through scenic landscape of Spanish desert. Rivas-Urbanizaciones and Arganda del Rey are underground stations with large island platforms, and Rivas Futura, Rivas Vaciamadrid and La Poveda are surface stations with side platforms. Given the continuous growth of particularly Rivas-Vaciamadrid, there are many plans for the future of Line 9B. Most concretely, the municipal government intends to construct a new station at Calle José Saramago between Rivas-Urbanizaciones and Rivas Futura and to cover a stretch of tracks to remedy the current state of surface segments effectively cutting the city in half.

== Rolling stock ==
Class 5000 and 9000 usually run on Line 9A with occasional class 6000s, and class 6000s usually run on Line 9B.

== Stations ==
District/Municipally	Station	Opened	Zone	Connections
Fuencarral-El Pardo	Paco de Lucía	2015	A	Cercanías Madrid:
Fuencarral-El Pardo	Mirasierra	2011	A	
Fuencarral-El Pardo	Herrera Oria	1983	A	
Fuencarral-El Pardo	Barrio del Pilar	1983	A	
Tetuán	Ventilla	1983	A	
Tetuán	Plaza de Castilla	1961	A	Madrid Metro:
Chamartín	Duque de Pastrana	1983	A	
Chamartín	Pío XII	1983	A	
Chamartín	Colombia	1983	A	Madrid Metro:
Chamartín	Concha Espina	1983	A	
Chamartín	Cruz del Rayo	1983	A	
Chamartín / Salamanca	Avenida de América	1973	A	Madrid Metro:
Salamanca	Núñez de Balboa	1970	A	Madrid Metro:
Salamanca	Príncipe de Vergara	1924	A	Madrid Metro:
Retiro	Ibiza	1986	A	
Retiro	Sainz de Baranda	1979	A	Madrid Metro:
Retiro / Moratalaz	Estrella	1980	A	
Moratalaz	Vinateros	1980	A	
Moratalaz	Artilleros	1980	A	
Moratalaz	Pavones	1980	A	
Vicálvaro	Valdebernardo	1998	A	
Vicálvaro	Vicálvaro	1998	A	
Vicálvaro	San Cipriano	1988	A	
Vicálvaro	Puerta de Arganda	1998	A	Cercanías Madrid:
Rivas-Vaciamadrid	Rivas Urbanizaciones	1999	B1	
Rivas-Vaciamadrid	Rivas Futura	2008	B1	
Rivas-Vaciamadrid	Rivas Vaciamadrid	1999	B2	
Arganda del Rey	La Poveda	1999	B3	
Arganda del Rey	Arganda del Rey	1999	B3	

== See also ==
- Madrid
- Transport in Madrid
- List of Madrid Metro stations
- List of metro systems
