= Colombia (Madrid Metro) =

Madrid Metro station

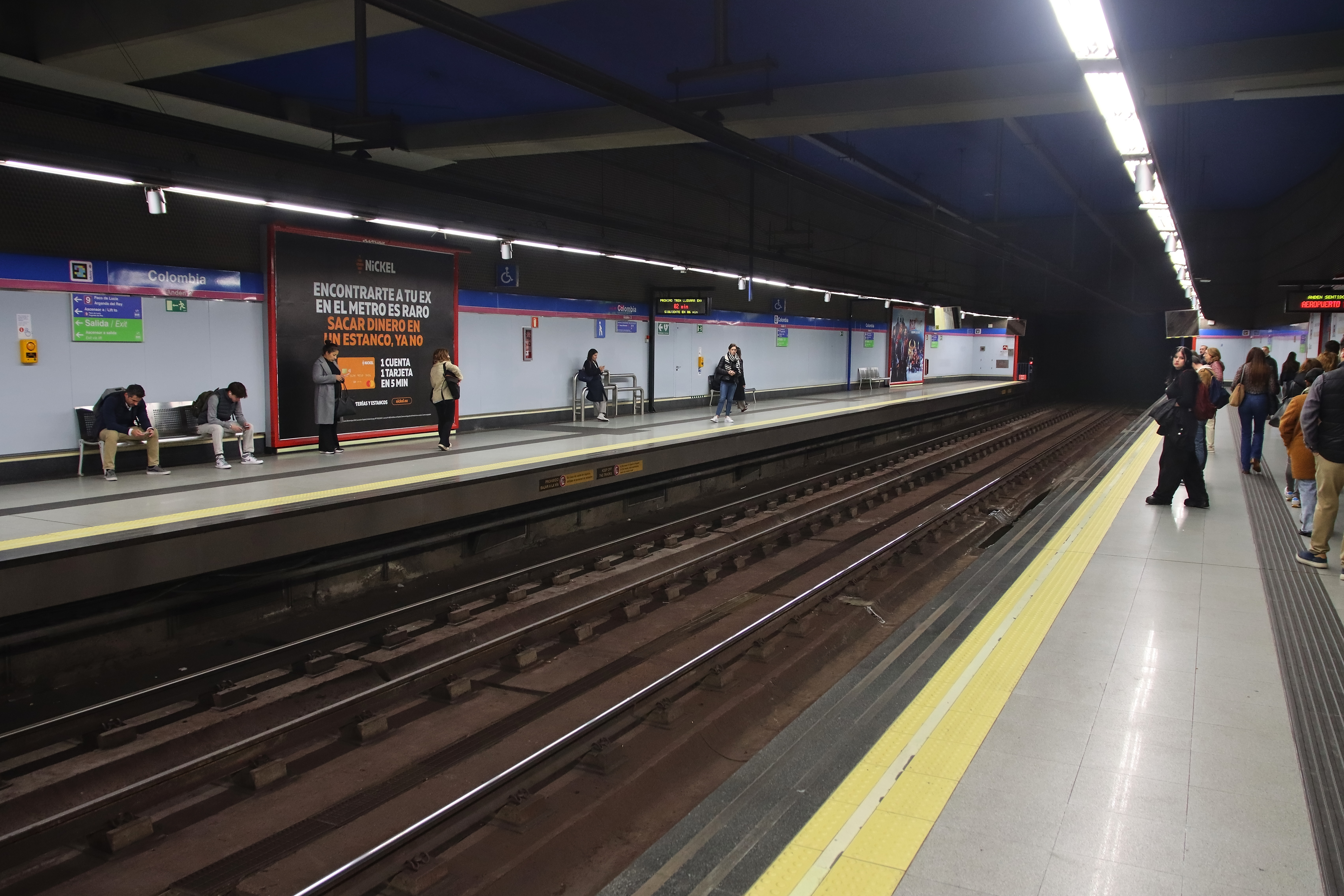
- Platforms of the station of the line 8

General information
- Location: Chamartín, Madrid; Spain
- Coordinates: 40.4563406°N 3.6768255°W
- System: Madrid Metro station
- Owner: CRTM
- Operator: CRTM

Construction
- Accessible: yes

Other information
- Fare zone: A

History
- Opened: 30 December 1983; 42 years ago

Services
Preceding station	Madrid Metro	Following station
Nuevos Ministerios Terminus	Line 8	Pinar del Rey towards Aeropuerto T4
Pío XII towards Paco de Lucía	Line 9	Concha Espina towards Arganda del Rey
Location
- Location within Madrid

Colombia [koˈlombja] is a station on Line 8 and Line 9 of the Madrid Metro, located under the calle de Colombia. It is in fare Zone A.
