= Rivas Urbanizaciones (Madrid Metro) =

Madrid Metro station

- Platform of the station

General information
- Location: Rivas-Vaciamadrid, Community of Madrid; Spain
- Coordinates: 40.3667715°N 3.5472758°W
- System: Madrid Metro station
- Owner: CRTM
- Operator: TFM

Construction
- Accessible: yes

Other information
- Fare zone: B1

History
- Opened: 7 April 1999; 27 years ago

Services
Preceding station	Madrid Metro	Following station
Puerta de Arganda towards Paco de Lucía	Line 9	Rivas Futura towards Arganda del Rey
Location
- Location within Madrid

Rivas Urbanizaciones [ˈriβas uɾβaniθaˈθjones] is a station on Line 9 of the Madrid Metro, serving the Rivas Urbanizaciones development. It is located in fare Zone B1.
