= Concha Espina (Madrid Metro) =

Madrid Metro station

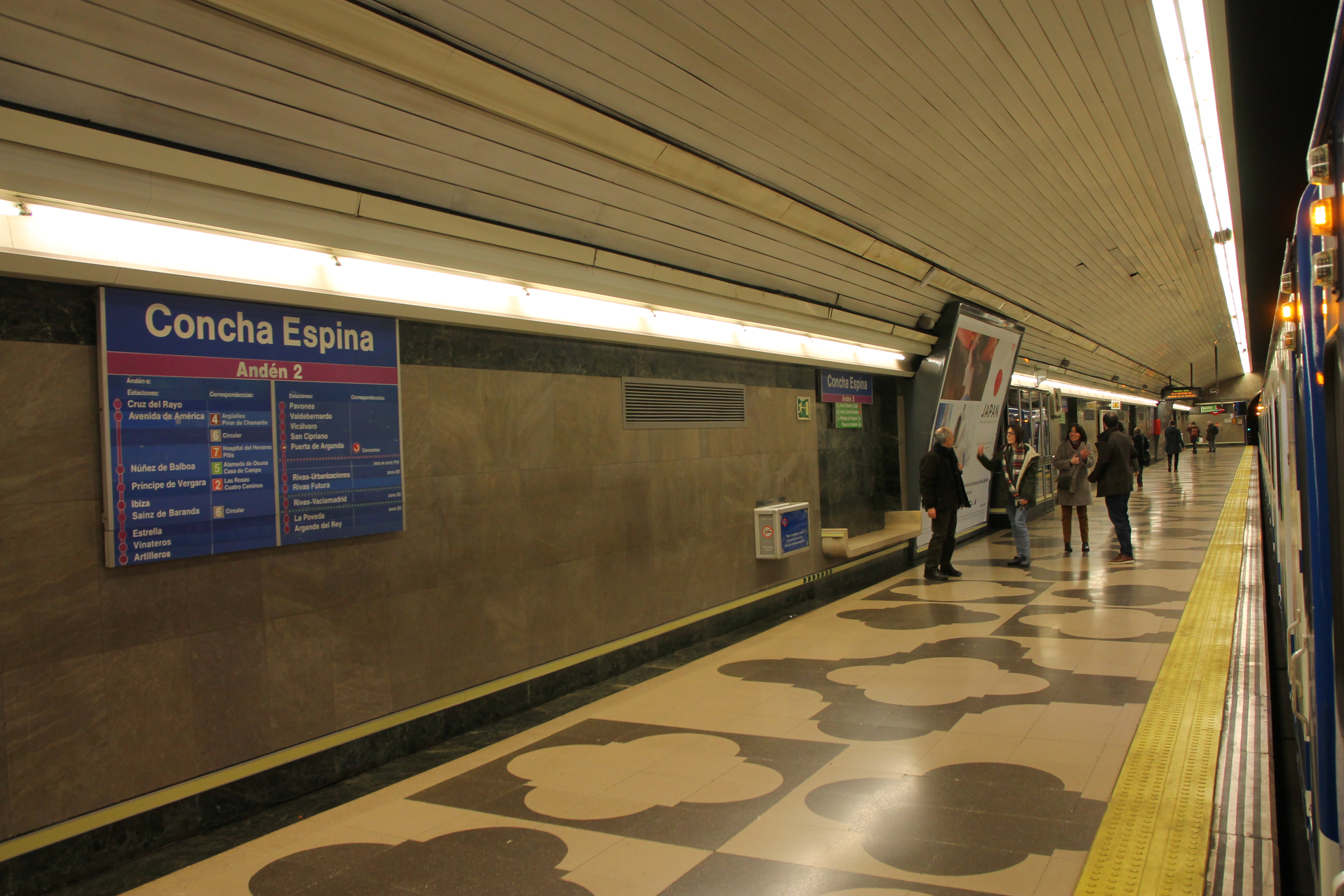
- Platform of the station

General information
- Location: Chamartín, Madrid; Spain
- Coordinates: 40.4505065°N 3.6776132°W
- System: Madrid Metro station
- Owner: CRTM
- Operator: CRTM

Construction
- Accessible: No

Other information
- Fare zone: A

History
- Opened: 30 December 1983; 42 years ago

Services
Preceding station	Madrid Metro	Following station
Colombia towards Paco de Lucía	Line 9	Cruz del Rayo towards Arganda del Rey
Location
- Location within Madrid

Concha Espina [ˈkontʃa esˈpina] is a station on Line 9 of the Madrid Metro. It is located in fare Zone A.

It is named after the Spanish writer Concha Espina (1870s–1955).
