= Pavones (Madrid Metro) =

Madrid Metro station

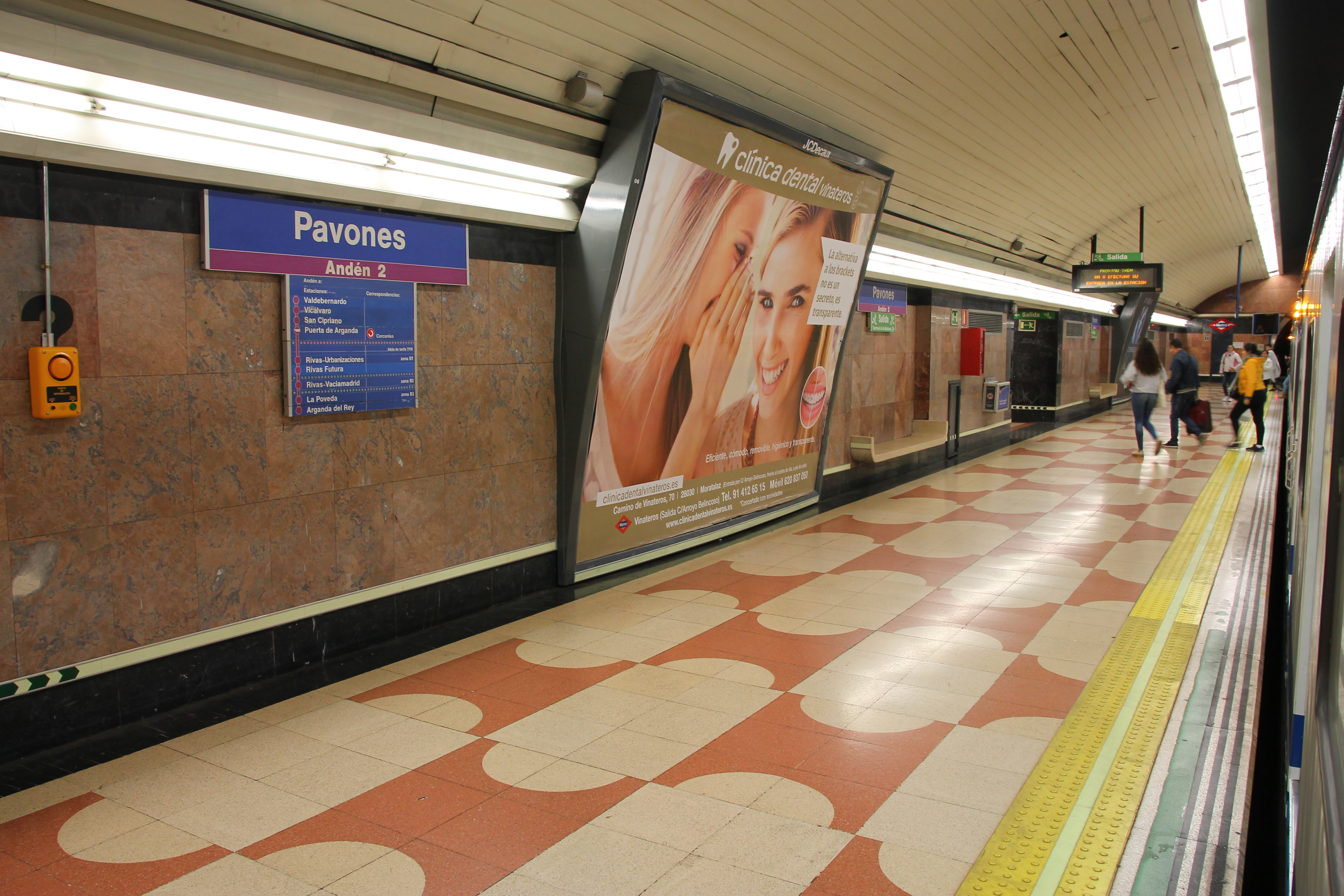

General information
- Location: Moratalaz, Madrid; Spain
- Coordinates: 40.4005126°N 3.6351174°W
- System: Madrid Metro station
- Owner: CRTM
- Operator: CRTM

Construction
- Accessible: yes

Other information
- Fare zone: A

History
- Opened: 31 January 1980; 46 years ago

Services
Preceding station	Madrid Metro	Following station
Artilleros towards Paco de Lucía	Line 9	Valdebernardo towards Arganda del Rey
Location
- Location within Madrid

Pavones [paˈβones] is a station on Line 9 of the Madrid Metro, serving the Pavones barrio. It is located in fare Zone A.
