= Cruz del Rayo (Madrid Metro) =

Madrid Metro station

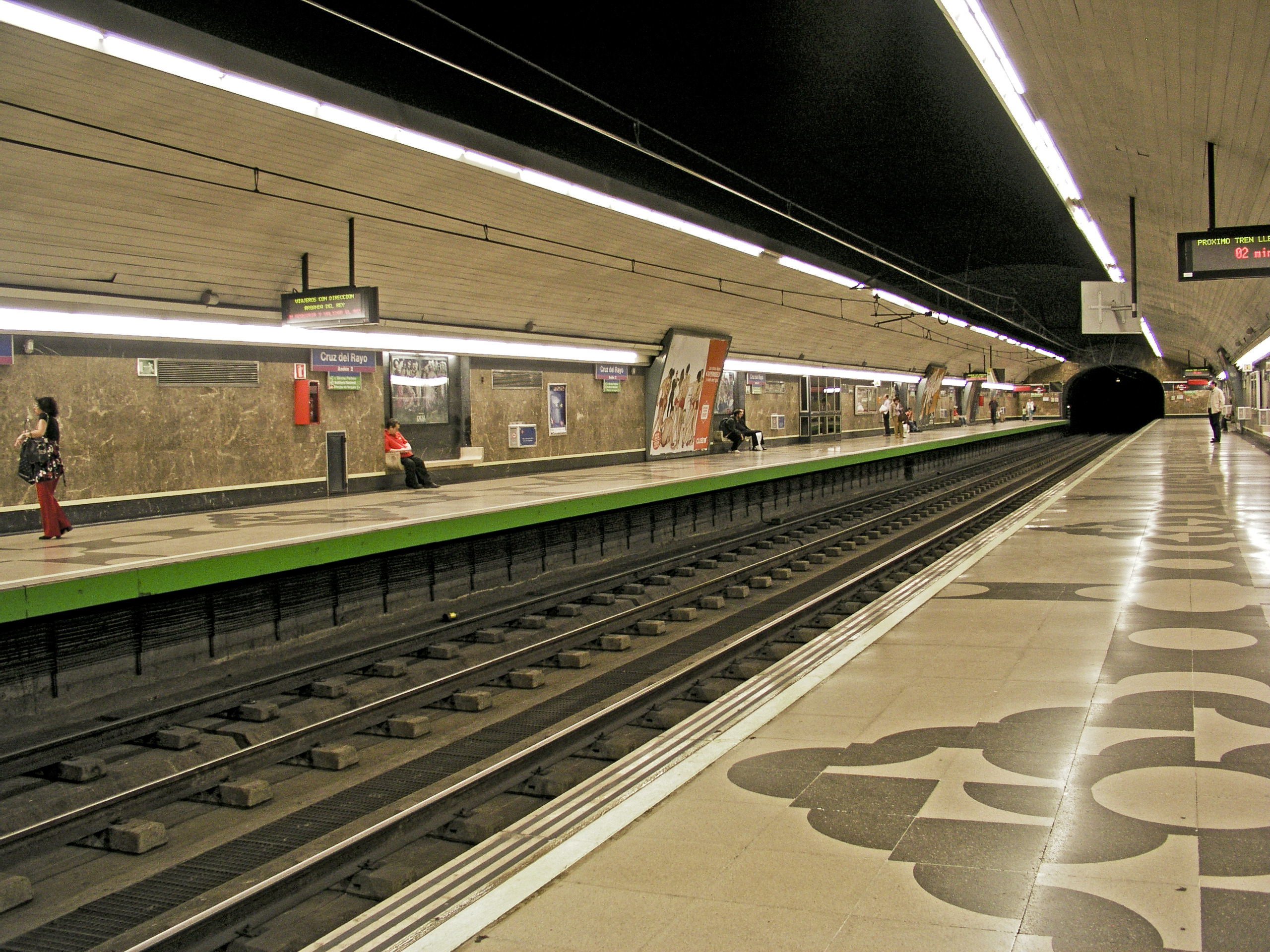

General information
- Location: Chamartín, Madrid; Spain
- Coordinates: 40.4442694°N 3.6782139°W
- System: Madrid Metro station
- Owner: CRTM
- Operator: CRTM

Construction
- Accessible: No

Other information
- Fare zone: A

History
- Opened: 30 December 1983; 42 years ago

Services
Preceding station	Madrid Metro	Following station
Concha Espina towards Paco de Lucía	Line 9	Avenida de América towards Arganda del Rey
Location
- Location within Madrid

Cruz del Rayo [ˈkɾuθ ðel ˈraʝo] is a station on Line 9 of the Madrid Metro, named for the Colonia Cruz del Rayo, a planned suburb. It is located in fare Zone A.
