= Ibiza (Madrid Metro) =

Madrid Metro station

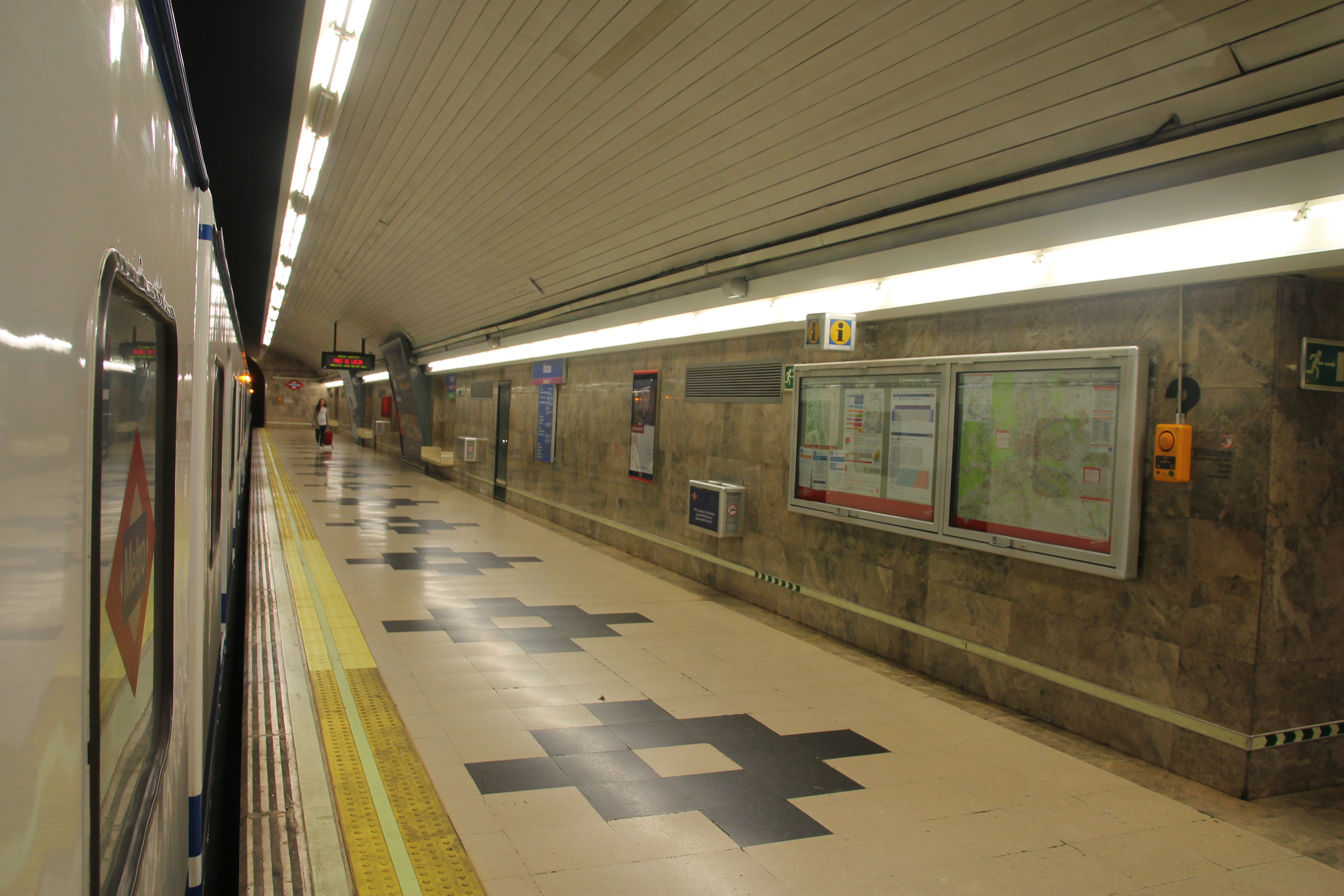
- Platform of the station

General information
- Location: Retiro, Madrid; Spain
- Coordinates: 40.4183629°N 3.6779697°W
- System: Madrid Metrostation
- Owner: CRTM
- Operator: CRTM

Construction
- Accessible: No

Other information
- Fare zone: A

History
- Opened: 24 February 1986; 40 years ago

Services
Preceding station	Madrid Metro	Following station
Príncipe de Vergara towards Paco de Lucía	Line 9	Sainz de Baranda towards Arganda del Rey
Location
- Location within Madrid

Ibiza [iˈβiθa] is a station on Line 9 of the Madrid Metro, located under the Calle de Ibiza. It is in fare Zone A.
