= Barrio del Pilar (Madrid Metro) =

Madrid Metro station

- Platform of the station

General information
- Location: Fuencarral-El Pardo, Madrid; Spain
- Coordinates: 40.4768864°N 3.7031628°W
- System: Madrid Metro station
- Owner: CRTM
- Operator: CRTM

Construction
- Accessible: No

Other information
- Fare zone: A

History
- Opened: 3 June 1983; 43 years ago

Services
Preceding station	Madrid Metro	Following station
Herrera Oria towards Paco de Lucía	Line 9	Ventilla towards Arganda del Rey
Location
- Location within Madrid

Barrio del Pilar (Spanish pronunciation: [ˈbarjo ðel piˈlaɾ]) is a station on Line 9 of the Madrid Metro, serving the El Pilar neighbourhood (barrio). It is located in fare Zone A.

== History ==
The station was inaugurated on June 3, 1983, with the northern section of the line, initially designated as 9B or 9N. It became part of Line 9 on February 24, 1986.
