= Valdebernardo (Madrid Metro) =

Madrid Metro station

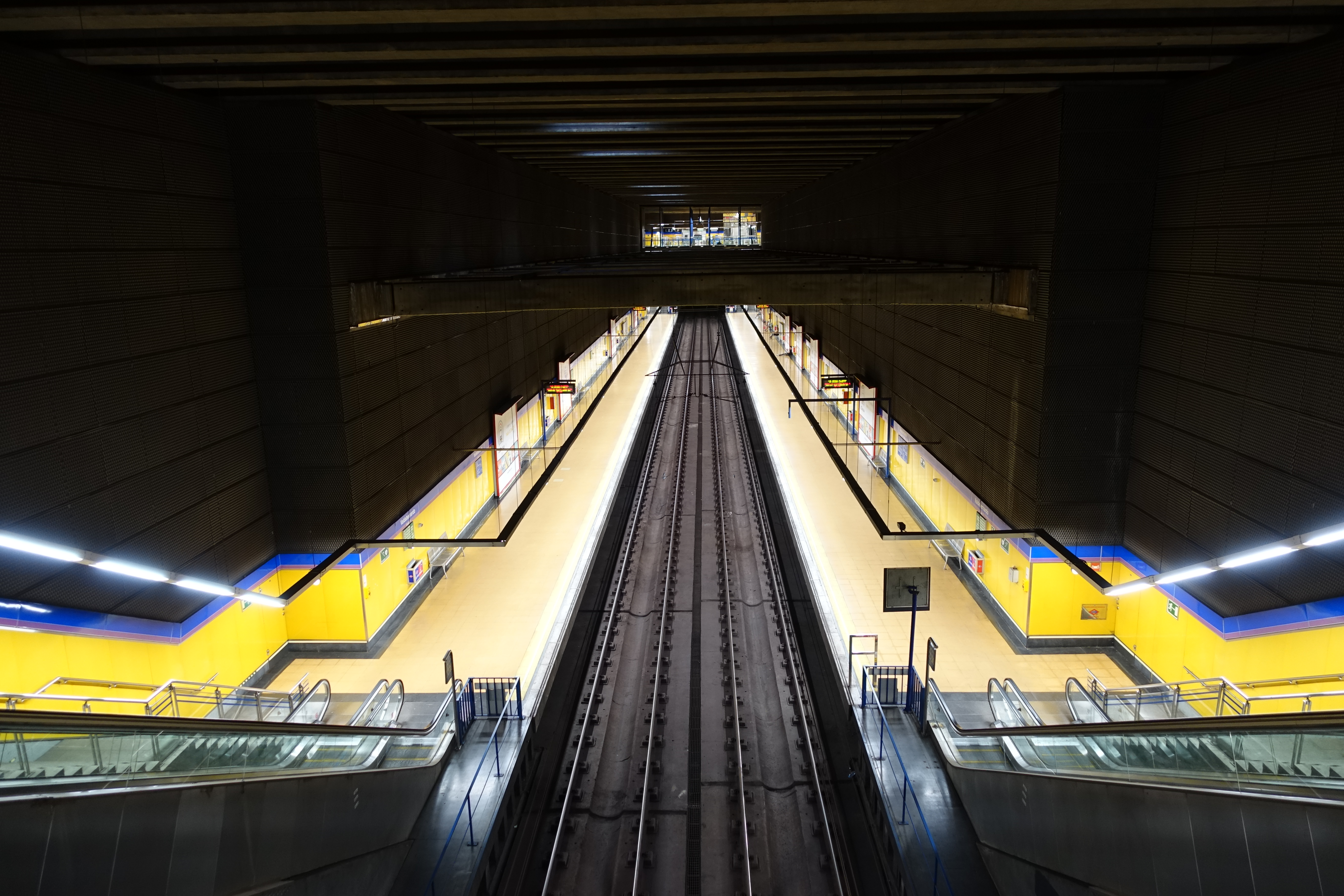

General information
- Location: Vicálvaro, Madrid; Spain
- Coordinates: 40.4000462°N 3.6215607°W
- System: Madrid Metro station
- Owner: CRTM
- Operator: CRTM

Construction
- Accessible: yes

Other information
- Fare zone: A

History
- Opened: 1 December 1998; 27 years ago

Services
Preceding station	Madrid Metro	Following station
Pavones towards Paco de Lucía	Line 9	Vicálvaro towards Arganda del Rey
Location
- Location within Madrid

Valdebernardo [baldeβeɾˈnaɾðo] is a station on line 9 of Madrid Metro which runs under Indalecio Prieto Boulevard, in the Vicálvaro district of Madrid district, serving the Valdebernardo barrio. It is located in fare Zone A.

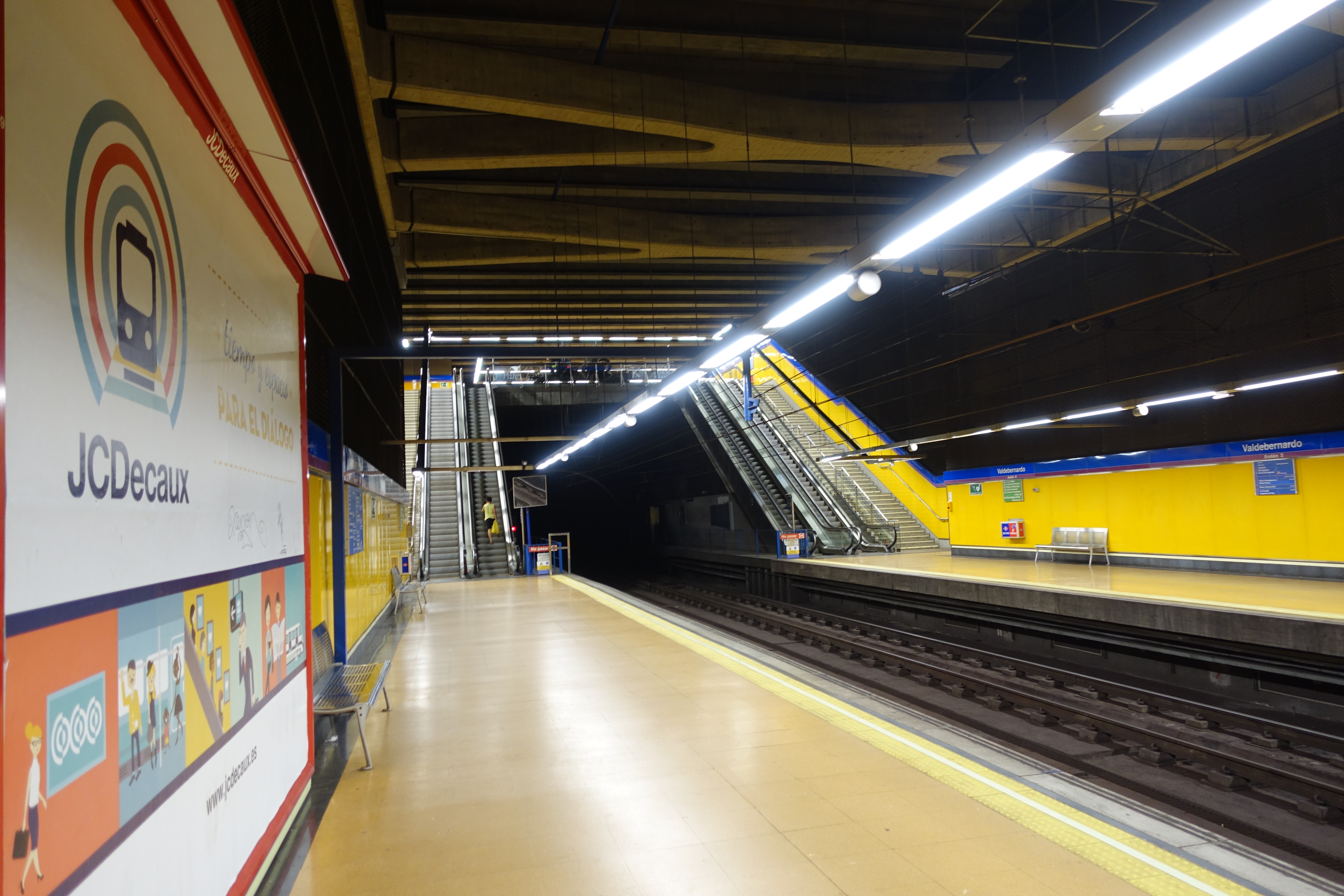
The northern exit of the station

The station opened its doors on 1 December 1998. The project leaders rejected the original name "Lucio de Mingo" (a war hero to some) because of possible conflicts. Valdebernardo, the name eventually chosen, translates to "Bernardo's Valley" and refers to the Barcelonian Bernardo Gomez, ancestor of the landlord.

Metro Valdebernardo is special in the way its exits are located at the end of the spacious platforms and not, as is usual for most single-line stations, in hallways that branch off to the sides. Due to the station having been built underneath a green strip in the middle of the central road of the neighbourhood, it also has skylights.
