= Mirasierra (Madrid Metro) =

Madrid Metro station

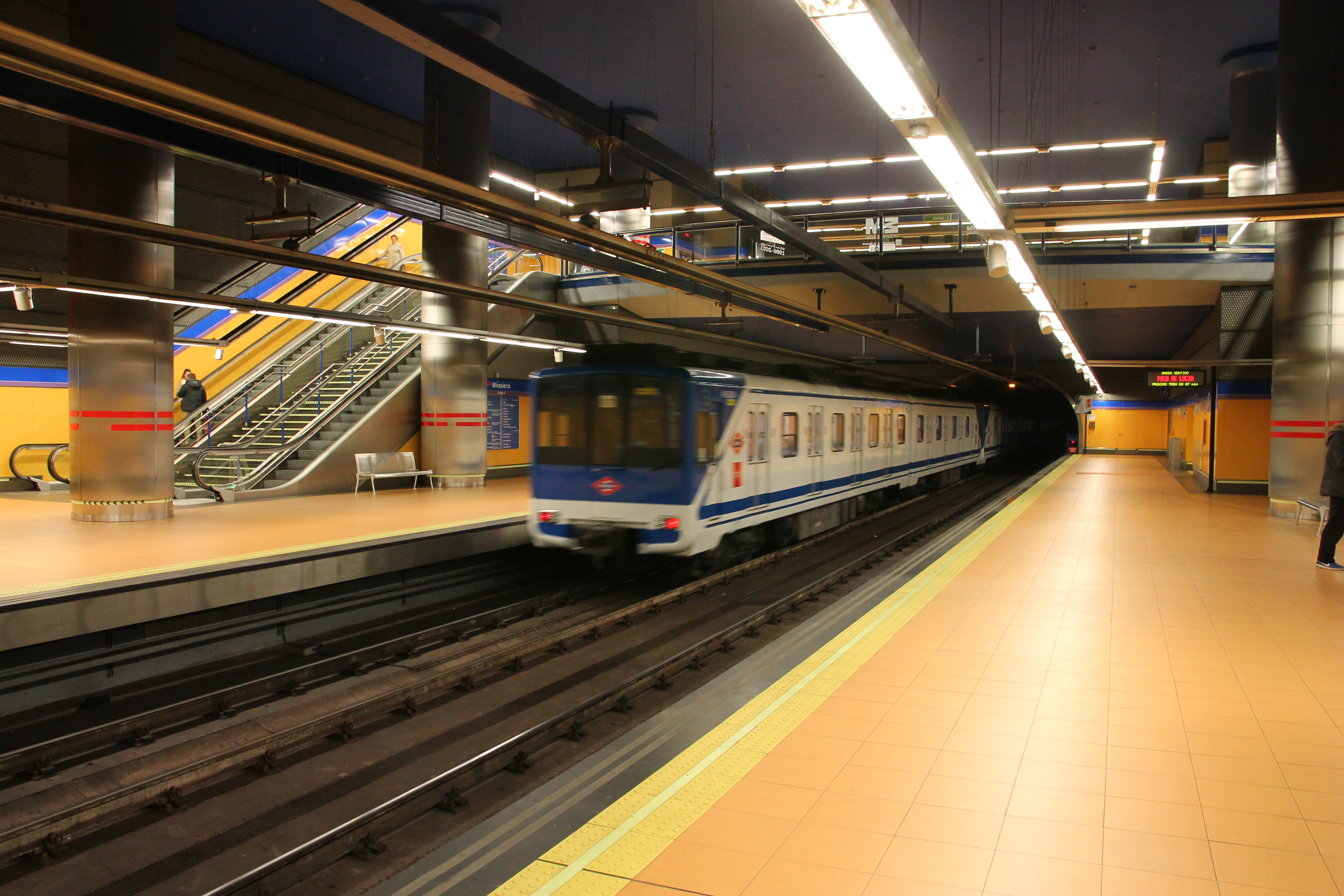

General information
- Location: Fuencarral-El Pardo, Madrid; Spain
- Coordinates: 40.4910935°N 3.7163508°W
- System: Madrid Metro station
- Owner: CRTM
- Operator: CRTM

Construction
- Accessible: yes

Other information
- Fare zone: A

History
- Opened: 28 March 2011; 15 years ago

Services
Preceding station	Madrid Metro	Following station
Paco de Lucía Terminus	Line 9	Herrera Oria towards Arganda del Rey
Location
- Location within Madrid

Mirasierra [ˌmi.ɾaˈsje.ra] is a station on Line 9 of the Madrid Metro, serving the Mirasierra barrio. It is located in fare Zone A.

The building of the station faced controversies since the original project (approved by the president of the region Esperanza Aguirre) supposed the wrecking of a high school in order to build the entrances on that lot. In the end, the high school was not demolished and the entrance was relocated.

The entrance to the station is on Calle Ventisquero de la Condesa 28. It is open from 6am to 1:30am except for the entrances with special opening times.

From 25 March 2015 the station is no longer a terminus, as Line 9 was extended to Paco de Lucía.
