= Herrera Oria (Madrid Metro) =

Madrid Metro station

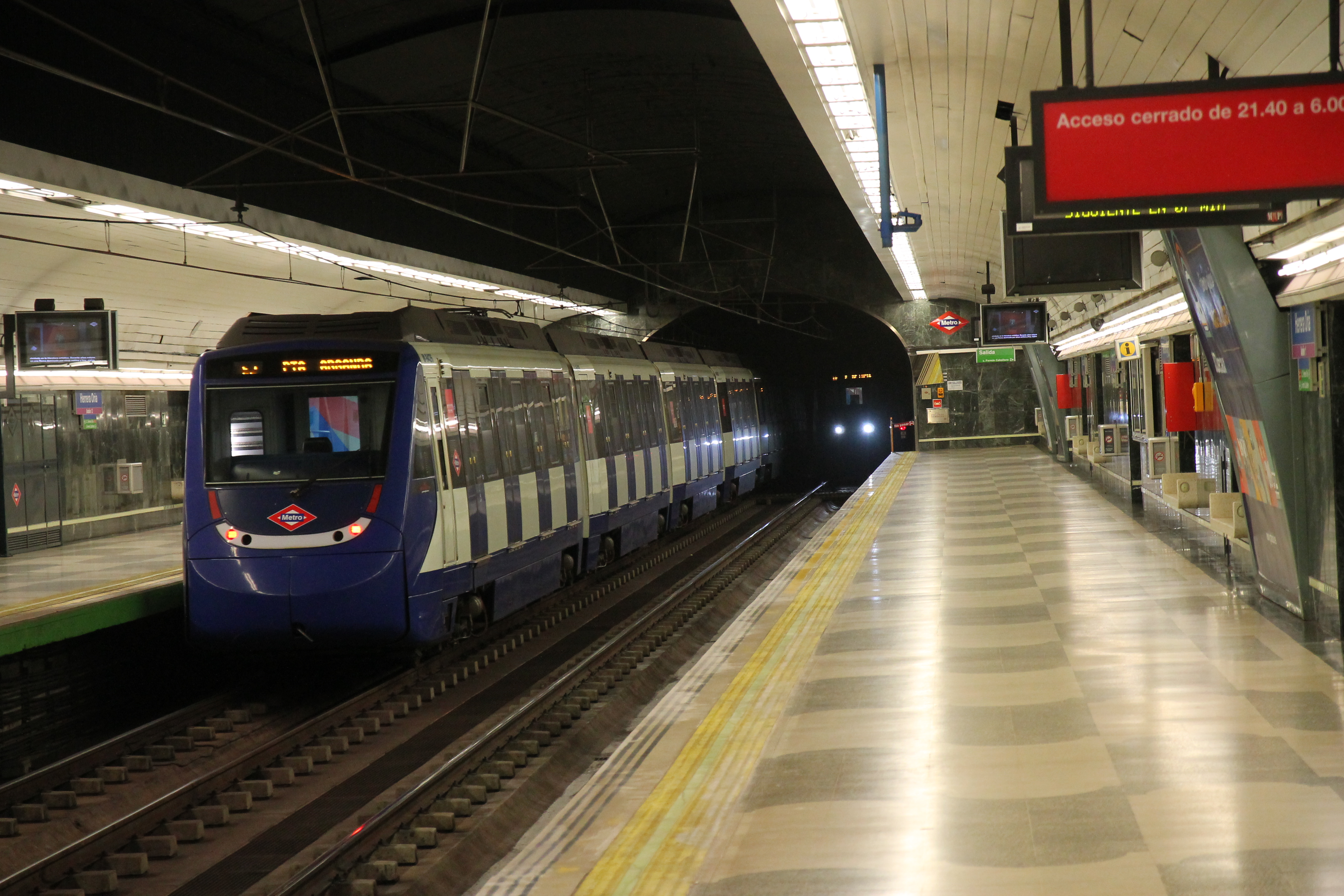
- Metro train at the station

General information
- Location: Fuencarral-El Pardo, Madrid; Spain
- Coordinates: 40.4846443°N 3.7075242°W
- System: Madrid Metro station
- Owner: CRTM
- Operator: CRTM

Construction
- Accessible: No

Other information
- Fare zone: A

History
- Opened: 3 June 1983; 43 years ago

Services
Preceding station	Madrid Metro	Following station
Mirasierra towards Paco de Lucía	Line 9	Barrio del Pilar towards Arganda del Rey
Location
- Location within Madrid

Herrera Oria [eˈre.ɾa ˈoɾ.ja] is a station on Line 9 of the Madrid Metro, near the Avenida del Cardenal Herrera Oria ("Cardinal Herrera Oria Avenue"). It is located in fare Zone A.
