= Moratalaz =

Coordinates: 40.409869°N 3.644436°W

- District of Madrid
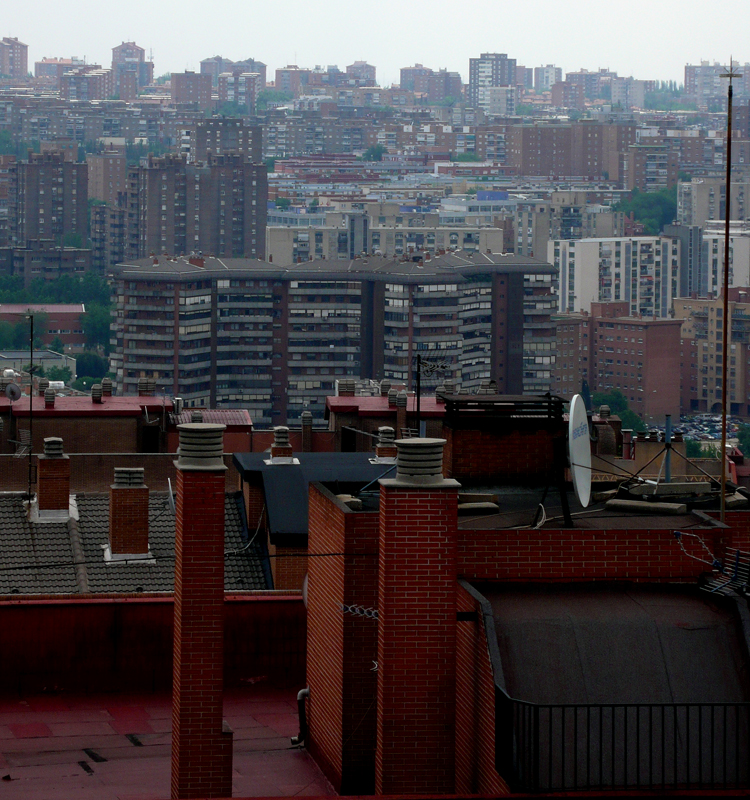
- Moratalaz from Retiro district

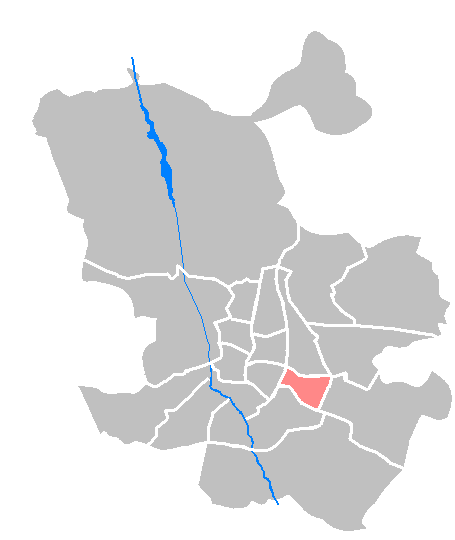
- Country: Spain
- Aut. community: Madrid
- Municipality: Madrid

Government
  - Councillor-President: Ignacio Pezuela Cabañes (PP, 2023)

Area
  - Total: 6.34 km^{2} (2.45 sq mi)

Population
  - Total: 104,923
  - Density: 16,549.37/km^{2} (42,862.7/sq mi)
- Postal code: 28030
- Madrid district number: 14

Moratalaz is a district of Madrid, Spain. It is a well-known area because musicians such as Melendi and Alejandro Sanz have lived there. Moratalaz is on east of municipality of Madrid. It has 6.34 km^{2} (2.45 sq mi) of surface area and is delineated by the highways of M-30 to the west, M-40 to the east, M23 to the north and A-3 to the south.

== Geography ==
=== Subdivision ===
The district is administratively divided into seven wards (barrios):

- Fontarrón (145)
- Horcajo (142)
- Marroquina (143)
- Media Legua (144)
- Pavones (141)
- Vinateros (146)

== History ==
Moratalaz arose as a commuter suburb of Madrid during the 1960s. Famous inhabitants of the district have been Elvira Lindo, Melendi, el Dioni, Alejandro Sanz, "Cleanhead" Joe McGaha, and Letizia Ortiz.

Before 1960, Moratalaz was an agglomeration of barely 40 houses with only one paved street. It was located midway on a road that connected Madrid's main cemetery Cementerio de la Almudena with the then unincorporated village of Vallecas.

The Colonia del Ferrocarril was a housing project in the 1960s that was developed in Moratalaz. The Madrid-Arganda del Rey train stopped there, and Moratalaz kept growing.

A military property gave birth to what today is one of the main streets of the district, Calle del Pico de los Artilleros. And an old road connecting Madrid with Castilla La Mancha gave rise to Moratalaz's main avenue, Camino de los Vinateros.

There was extraordinary and uncontrolled development in the 1970s, thanks to the programs of the Ministry of the Housing and the construction company Urbis. That led to the typical wide avenues and open spaces of Moratalaz, where traffic lanes are separated from houses by a wide green zone in between. That concept was not very popular in the 1970s, but nowadays it is much appreciated, as it's an excellent measure against noise pollution.

The distinctive emblem of Public Housing during Franco's dictatorship (a yoke traversed with arrows) can still be found in the older blocks dating from that era.

Valencian Antonio Galbis holds the Guinness Book of World Records for the largest paella that 100,000 people in Moratalaz enjoyed in 2001. Several giant cranes, rakes, a paella pan of 400 m^{2} (4,300 sq ft), 6,000 kg (13,000 lb) of rice, 12,500 kg (27,600 lb) of chicken and rabbit, 5,000 kg (11,000 lb) of vegetables, 11,000 L (2,400 imp gal; 2,900 US gal) of virgin olive oil, 300 kg (660 lb) of salt, 26 kg (57 lb) of pimentón (smoked paprika), 16 kg (35 lb) of annatto and a kilogram of ground saffron were used.

== Population ==
In this area live 106,344 people, 53,203 of which are immigrants according to the 2022 census.

== Main sights ==
Moratalaz is famous for its large parks and open spaces. The Church of Jesus Christ of Latter-Day Saints (Mormons) maintains a temple in the district. It is the only Mormon temple in Spain.

== Transportation ==
Moratalaz is served by Metro de Madrid line 9. It has three stops in the district: Vinateros, Artilleros and Pavones; a fourth station, Estrella, lies under the M-30 motorway between Moratalaz and the Retiro district.

Additionally, Moratalaz is served by several bus lines and a night bus, connecting with the city center thanks to the bus line 20 as well as the line 71. Also, the train lines closest to Moratalaz are line C1 as well as line C10.
