= Rivas-Vaciamadrid =

- Municipality
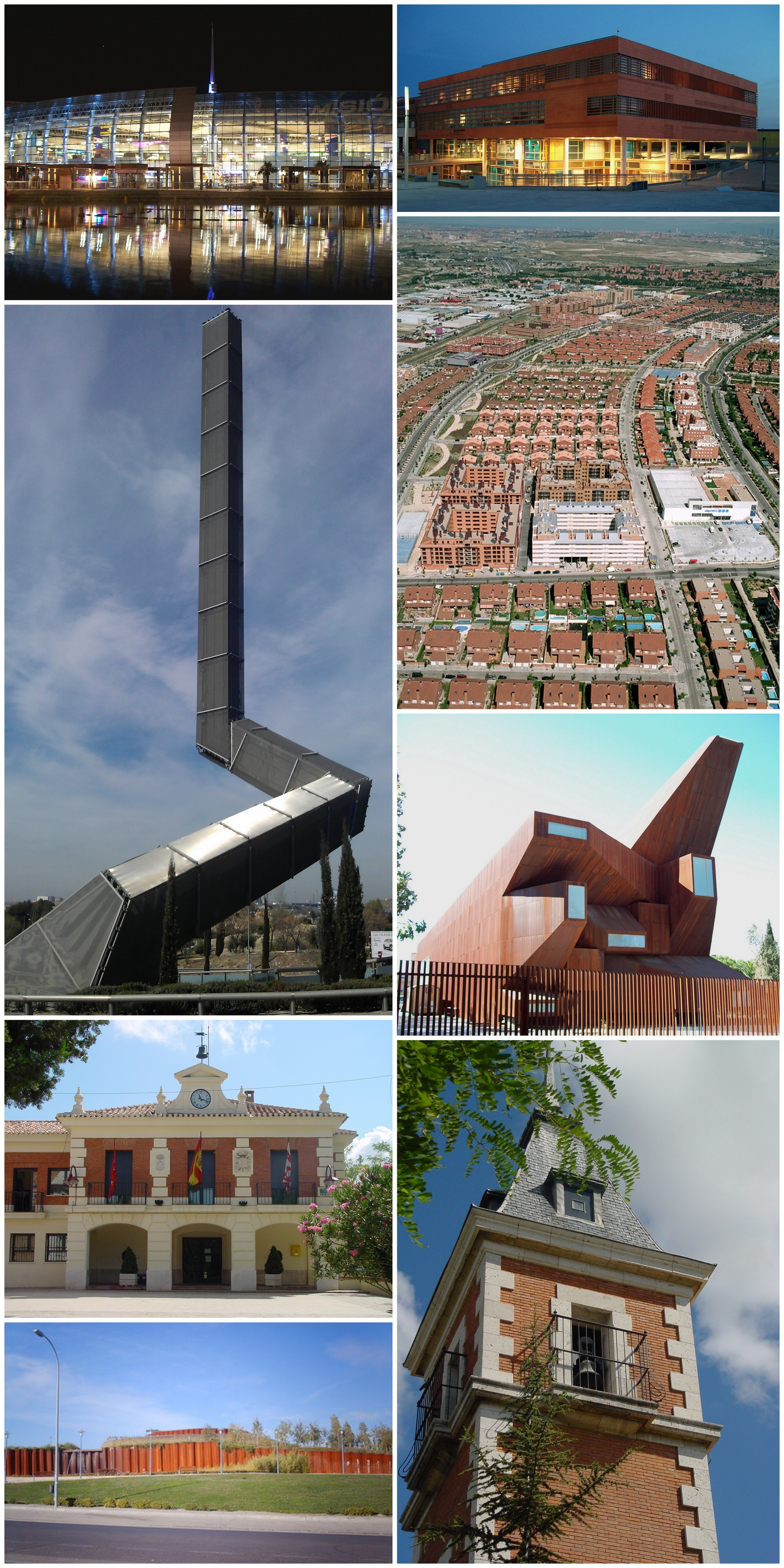
- Left: H2O mall, av. Almendros monolith, April 19th square, Bellavista park. Right: City hall, city centre, Santa Mónica church, Casco church

- Flag Coat of arms

- Location in Spain
- Coordinates: 40°20′22″N 3°31′5″W
- Country: Spain
- Region: Community of Madrid

Government
  - Type: Ayuntamiento
  - Body: Ayuntamiento de Rivas-Vaciamadrid
  - Mayor: Aída Castillejo (since 2022) (IU)

Area
  - Total: 67.16 km^{2} (25.93 sq mi)
- Elevation: 590 m (1,940 ft)
- Highest elevation: 699 m (2,293 ft)
- Lowest elevation: 525 m (1,722 ft)

Population (2025-01-01)
  - Total: 103,148
- Demonym: Ripense
- Time zone: UTC+1 (CET)
  - Summer (DST): UTC+2 (CEST)
- Postal code: 28521, 28522, 28523, 28524
- Website: www.rivasciudad.es

Rivas-Vaciamadrid (Spanish: [ˈriβas βaθjamaˈðɾið]) is the 15th most populated city in the Community of Madrid, Spain. It is part of the Madrid metropolitan area and is located 15 km from central Madrid, to the south-east. In the southern part of the municipality, the Manzanares river flows into the Jarama, which is part of the Lower Manzanares and Jarama Rivers Regional Park. Almost three-quarters of the municipality form part of the park, making it an important ecological centre with numerous lakes and various species of wildlife and fauna.

It has been one of the fastest-growing municipalities in Spain since the 1970s, growing from 500 inhabitants in the 1980s to its 2024 figure of over 100,000. It is bordered to the north by Madrid and San Fernando de Henares, to the south by Arganda del Rey and San Martín de la Vega, to the east by Mejorada del Campo and Velilla de San Antonio, and to the west by Getafe and Madrid (the district of Villa de Vallecas).

In 2015 Rivas-Vaciamadrid municipality had the fourth lowest rate of population at risk of poverty, among municipalities with more than 50,000 inhabitants. It is the most populated city in Spain governed by United Left.

== History ==
In 1845, the area of Vaciamadrid, previously part of the village of Vallecas, was joined to the town of Rivas, with the unified municipality originally called Ribas de Jarama.

The area was devastated during the Spanish Civil War and had to be rebuilt in the post-civil war period. In 1954 the name was changed to its current title. At the end of the 1980s the area was designated as a future nucleus for new urbanisation projects under a project titled Rivas-Urbanizaciones (Rivas-Urbanisations). The first developments were those in the current districts of Pablo Iglesias and Covibar.

In 2004 the municipal boundary with the city of Madrid was altered. This involved the transfer of areas known as Covibar-Madrid to Rivas-Vaciamadrid. In exchange, some uninhabited areas in Los Berrocales district were transferred to the Vicálvaro district of Madrid in order to allow the construction of a new housing project.

== Local politics ==
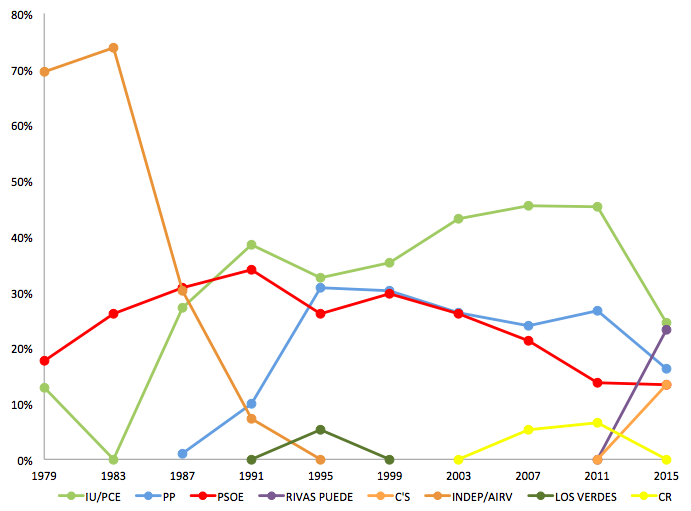
Municipal elections results since 1979.

Current number of city councillors by party (2023–2027).

Rivas-Vaciamadrid has always been governed by left-wing parties, mostly United Left, that has remained uninterruptedly in power since 1991. The current mayor is Pedro del Cura, who took office in 2014 after José Masa's resignation, and was re-elected in 2015. However, the 2015 election gave the worst result to United Left (24.5%) since its creation in 1986, due to the big support that the Podemos-linked candidacy Rivas Puede (Spanish for Rivas Can) obtained (23.3%).

Local election results in Rivas-Vaciamadrid (number of councillors)
Party	1987	1991	1995	1999	2003	2007	2011	2015	2019	2023
United Left (IU)	4	7	6	8	9	12	13	7	7	9
People's Party (PP)	0	2	6	7	6	6	7	4	2	9
Spanish Socialist Workers' Party (PSOE)	5	6	5	6	6	6	4	4	7	5
Rivas Puede (Podemos-linked candidacy)	-	-	-	-	-	-	-	6	2	0
Citizens	-	-	-	-	-	-	-	4	5	0
VOX									2	2
Others	4	2				1	1			

Mayors

Thorough most of its modern democratic history, the municipality of Rivas has been ruled by United Left, belonging to the so-called "red belt" of the region. No right-of-centre party has ruled the municipality since the Transition.

List of Mayors
Term	Name	Party
1979-1987	Antonio Martínez Vera	Indep.
1987-1991	Francisco José de Pablo Tamayo	PSOE-M
1991-1992	Eduardo Díaz Montes	IUCM
1992	Candela Cajas Martín	IUCM
1992-1995	Antonio Serrano Pérez	IUCM
1995-2003	Fausto Fernández Díaz	IUCM
2003-2014	José Masa Díaz	IUCM
2014-2022	Pedro del Cura Sánchez	IUCM
2022-current	Aída Castillejo	IU-Equo-MM

== Transport ==
The main road serving Rivas-Vaciamadrid is the A-3 motorway, that connects Madrid with Valencia. The exits to Rivas-Vaciamadrid are numbers 12 (West), 15 (Centre) and 17 (East).

The main public transport in Rivas-Vaciamadrid is the bus. There are four lines connecting with Madrid and three connecting with other municipalities. Moreover, the Madrid Metro line 9 crosses the city on its way between Madrid and Arganda del Rey, serving Rivas-Vaciamadrid with three stations: Rivas-Urbanizaciones in the west, Rivas Futura in the centre and Rivas-Vaciamadrid in the east.

== Festivals ==
The main festivals are the festival of Romería del Cristo de Rivas (29 September), San Isidro (15 May), the festival of the Communist Party of Spain (second weekend of September) and the festivals of the Urbanisation La Partija on the 15 June. The Miguel Ríos amphitheatre and fairgrounds are also home to dozens of concerts and minor festivities throughout the year

== Education ==
Locally there are 15 kindergartens (6 public and 9 private), 14 public primary education schools, 5 secondary education institutions and two private schools.

== Sports ==
The city has three teams playing at the top level in their respective sports: Rivas Osos in American football since 2000, Rivas Ecópolis plays in the women's basketball top division, the Liga Femenina de Baloncesto and Dridma Rivas Softball club plays in the Liga Nacional Sófbol Femenino División de Honor, the highest division of softball in Spain.
