= Conde de Casal (Madrid Metro) =

Madrid Metro station

- Platforms of the station

General information
- Location: Retiro, Madrid; Spain
- Coordinates: 40.4069722°N 3.6704034°W
- System: Madrid Metro station
- Owner: CRTM
- Operator: CRTM

Construction
- Accessible: yes

Other information
- Fare zone: A

History
- Opened: 11 October 1979

Services
| Preceding station | Madrid Metro | Following station |
|---|---|---|
| Pacífico clockwise / outer | Line 6 | Sainz de Baranda anticlockwise / inner |
Location
- Location within Madrid

Conde de Casal [ˈkonde ðe kaˈsal] is a station on Line 6 of the Madrid Metro, located under the Plaza del Conde de Casal (which takes its name from Manuel Escrivá de Romaní, conde de Casal, 20th-century politician). It is located in fare Zone A.
