= Vinateros =

Coordinates: 40°24′11″N 3°38′25″W

- City neighborhood
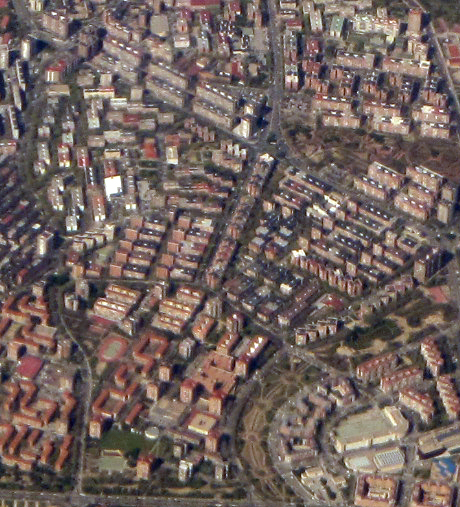

- Country: Spain
- Region: Community of Madrid
- Municipality: Madrid
- District: Moratalaz

Area
  - Total: 0.593979 km^{2} (0.229337 sq mi)

Population (2020)
  - Total: 17,225
  - Density: 28,999/km^{2} (75,108/sq mi)

Vinateros is an administrative neighborhood (barrio) of Madrid belonging to the district of Moratalaz. It has an area of 0.593979 km^{2} (0.229337 sq mi). As of 1 March 2020, it has a population of 17,225.
