= Pavones =

Coordinates: 40°23′41″N 3°37′59″W

- City neighborhood
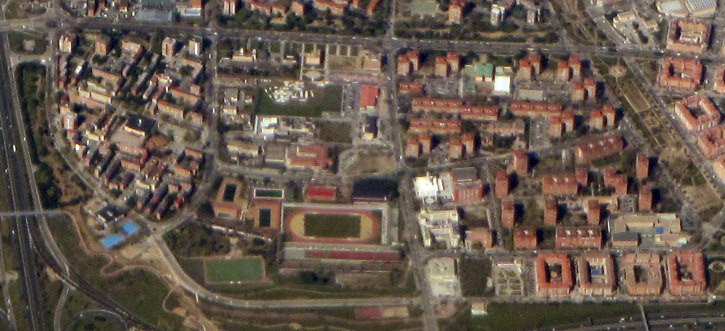

- Country: Spain
- Region: Community of Madrid
- Municipality: Madrid
- District: Moratalaz

Area
  - Total: 1.016979 km^{2} (0.392658 sq mi)

Population (2020)
  - Total: 9,197
  - Density: 9,043/km^{2} (23,420/sq mi)

Pavones [paˈβones] is an administrative neighborhood (barrio) of Madrid belonging to the district of Moratalaz. It has an area of 1.016979 km^{2} (0.392658 sq mi). As of 1 February 2020, it has a population of 9197. The Madrid Spain Temple of the Church of Jesus Christ of Latter-day Saints is located here; it is the church's most iconic building in Spain.
