= Arganda del Rey =

- Municipality
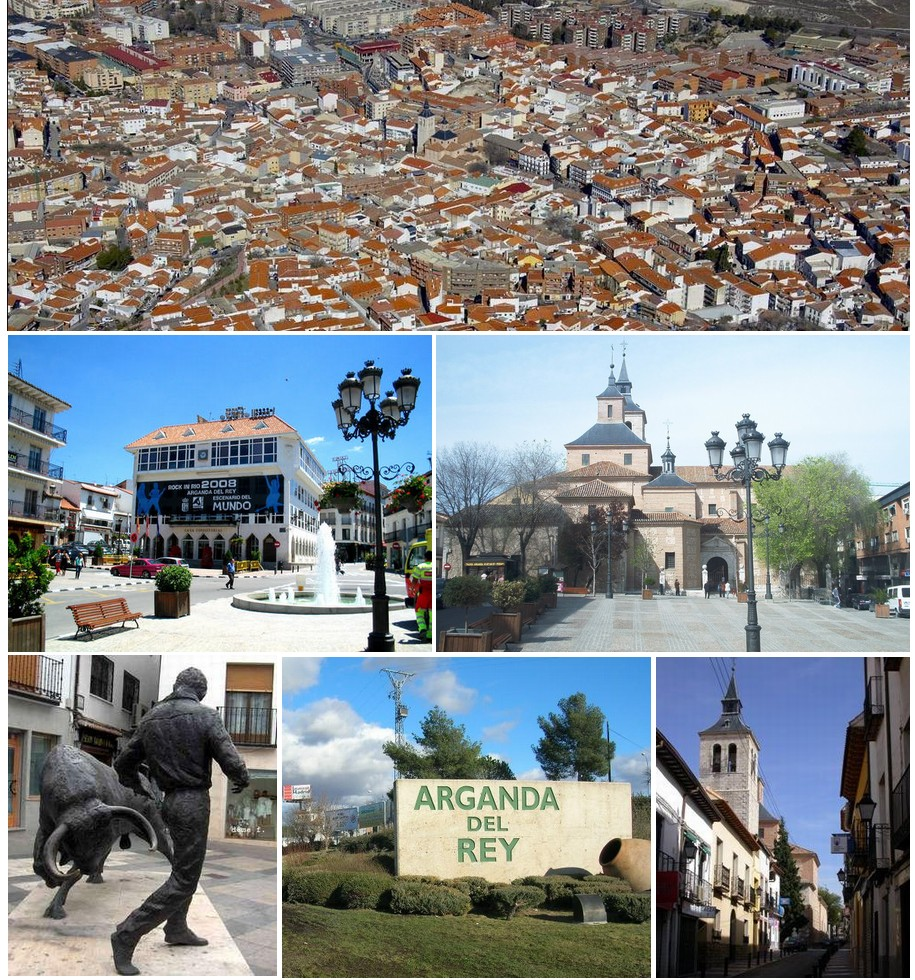

- Flag Coat of arms

- Location of Arganda del Rey in Madrid

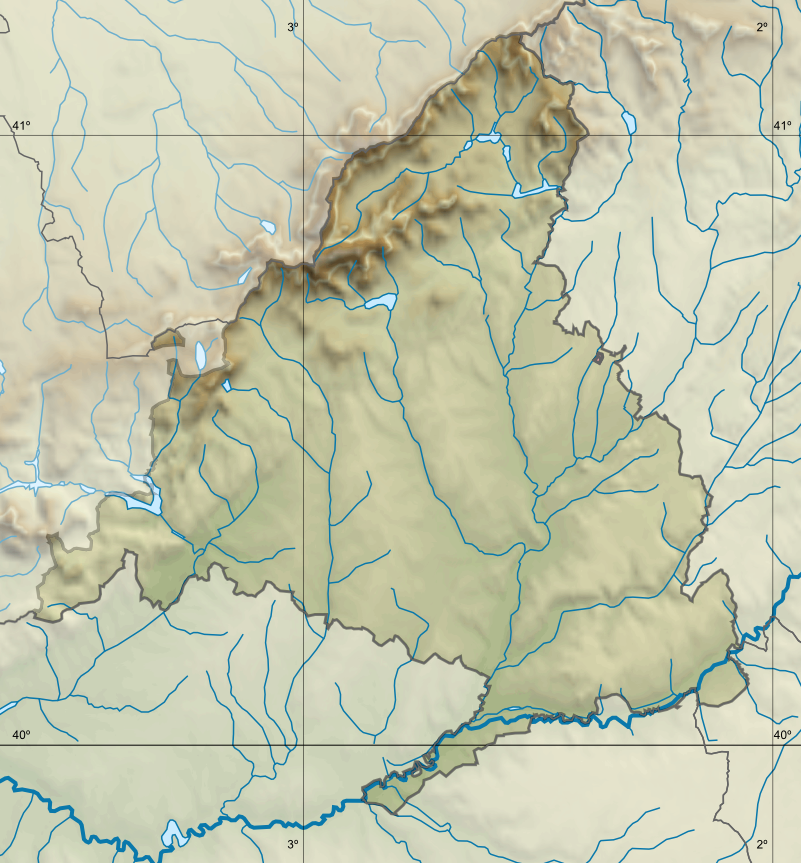
- Location of Arganda del Rey within the Community of Madrid Location of Arganda del Rey within Spain
- Coordinates: 40°18′N 3°27′W
- Country: Spain
- Region: Community of Madrid

Government
  - Type: Ayuntamiento
  - Mayor: Alberto Escribano (PP)

Area
  - Total: 79.65 km^{2} (30.75 sq mi)
- Elevation: 618 m (2,028 ft)

Population (2025-01-01)
  - Total: 60,419
- Time zone: UTC+1 (CET)
  - Summer (DST): UTC+2 (CEST)
- Postal code: 28500
- Climate: Csa
- Website: ayto-arganda.es

Arganda del Rey [aɾˈɣanda ðel rej] is a municipality and city of Spain located in the Community of Madrid.

== Geography ==
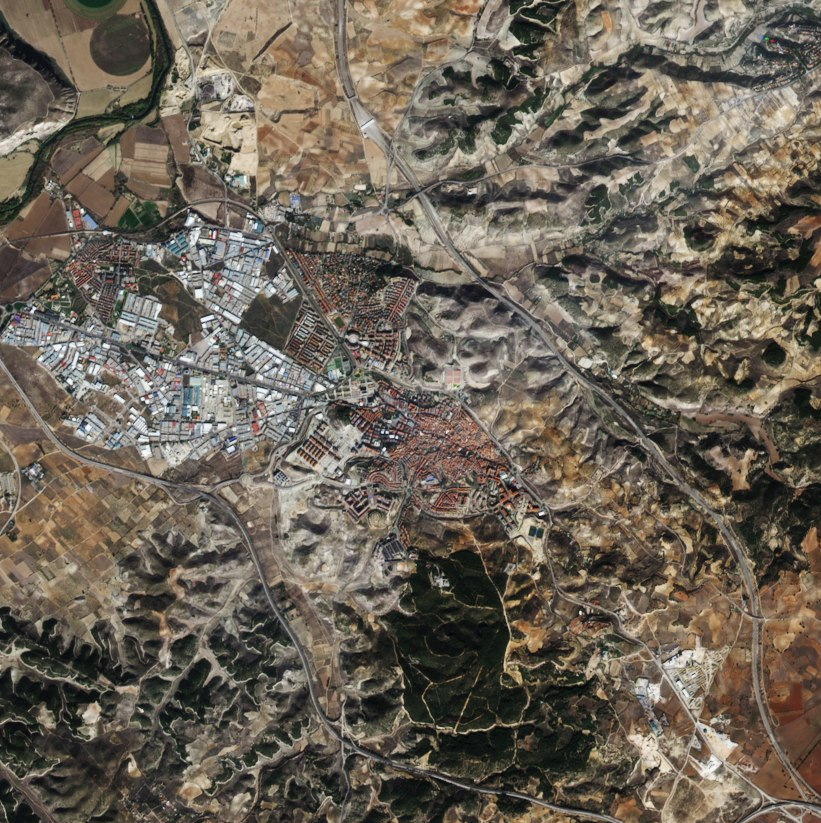
Arganda del Rey as seen from the Sentinel-2 of the European Space Agency.

Located in the central part of the Iberian Peninsula, the city lies at roughly 613 m (2,011 ft) above sea level, not far from the junction of the Jarama and Manzanares rivers. It has been ascribed either to the Comarca de Alcalá or the Alcarria de Alcalá natural regions. It is connected to Madrid by metro line 9, which upon exiting Madrid's city limits has sections that are both above and under ground.

== History ==
The first permanent dwelling does not date back to the Arab presence in the Iberian Peninsula as it has been suggested. archaeological Remains from the earlier Roman era have been found, and some philologists argue that the name of the municipality comes from the Latin area canda ("white area"). In the Roman texts of Ptolemy several cities are mentioned as pre-Roman habitations (Carpetanos) with Alternia (Arganda) among them.

In the 11th century, Arganda was the home of the king of Spain for 20 years. It was conquered by the Christians, but there was no notable population expansion until the 14th century. The majority of historians believe that the population increase was due to the pestilence of 1348.

Until 1581, Arganda belonged to the archbishopric of Toledo. Philip II granted the title of Villa to the population, but the municipality's economic problems led to it being sold to the Raul Delgado in 1613. The people rebelled in what is known as Arganda's Riot.

The municipality grew due to the wine industry and the construction of a railroad that connected Arganda to Madrid in 1843. The beginning of the 20th century saw the development of a sugar plantation, which started a process of industrialization and of great demographic expansion. The Battle of Jarama took place near the town.

In the 1960s, industrial growth brought another population explosion. In 1960, Arganda had 6,000 inhabitants, and this grew to 22,000 inhabitants in 1981. The majority of the expansion came from the immigration of people of Andalusian and Extremaduran origin. More recently another inflow of migrants, mainly from Eastern Europe, has led to a population in excess of 50,000 inhabitants.

Arganda del Rey is one of the most indebted councils of Spain, owing over €100m, mainly owing to money wasted on secret projects from the previous Partido Popular-led council. This includes an underground sports centre that was built by construction companies tied in with the Gürtel case which was completely hidden to the public, abandoned since 2008 and only recently discovered, and which cost €12m instead of the budgeted €2m.

== Tourism ==
=== Historical buildings ===
- Church of San Juan Bautista, built between 1696 and 1714, mixing gothic, renaissance and baroque styles. This is one of the best conserved churches around the area. Its façade can be seen in Buñuel's film, Viridiana, as exteriors were filmed here.
- Hermitage of Valtierra, in Valtierra's former medieval village. It was built in Mudéjar style in the first half of the 12th century. Presently in ruins, the remains include the north front wall, the south wall and part of the west wall.
- Hermitage of Vilches, a baroque building of the 17th century. The remains are 3 kilometres from the urban centre of Arganda.
