= Arganda del Rey (Madrid Metro) =

Madrid Metro station

- A Class 6000 train at the station

General information
- Location: Arganda del Rey, Community of Madrid; Spain
- Coordinates: 40.3036662°N 3.447521°W
- System: Madrid Metro station
- Owner: CRTM
- Operator: TFM

Construction
- Accessible: yes

Other information
- Fare zone: B3

History
- Opened: 7 April 1999; 27 years ago

Services
Preceding station	Madrid Metro	Following station
La Poveda towards Paco de Lucía	Line 9	Terminus
Location
- Location within Community of Madrid

Arganda del Rey [aɾˈɣanda ðel rej] is a station on Line 9 of the Madrid Metro, serving Arganda del Rey. It is located in fare Zone B3.
