= Paco de Lucía (Madrid Metro) =

Madrid Metro station

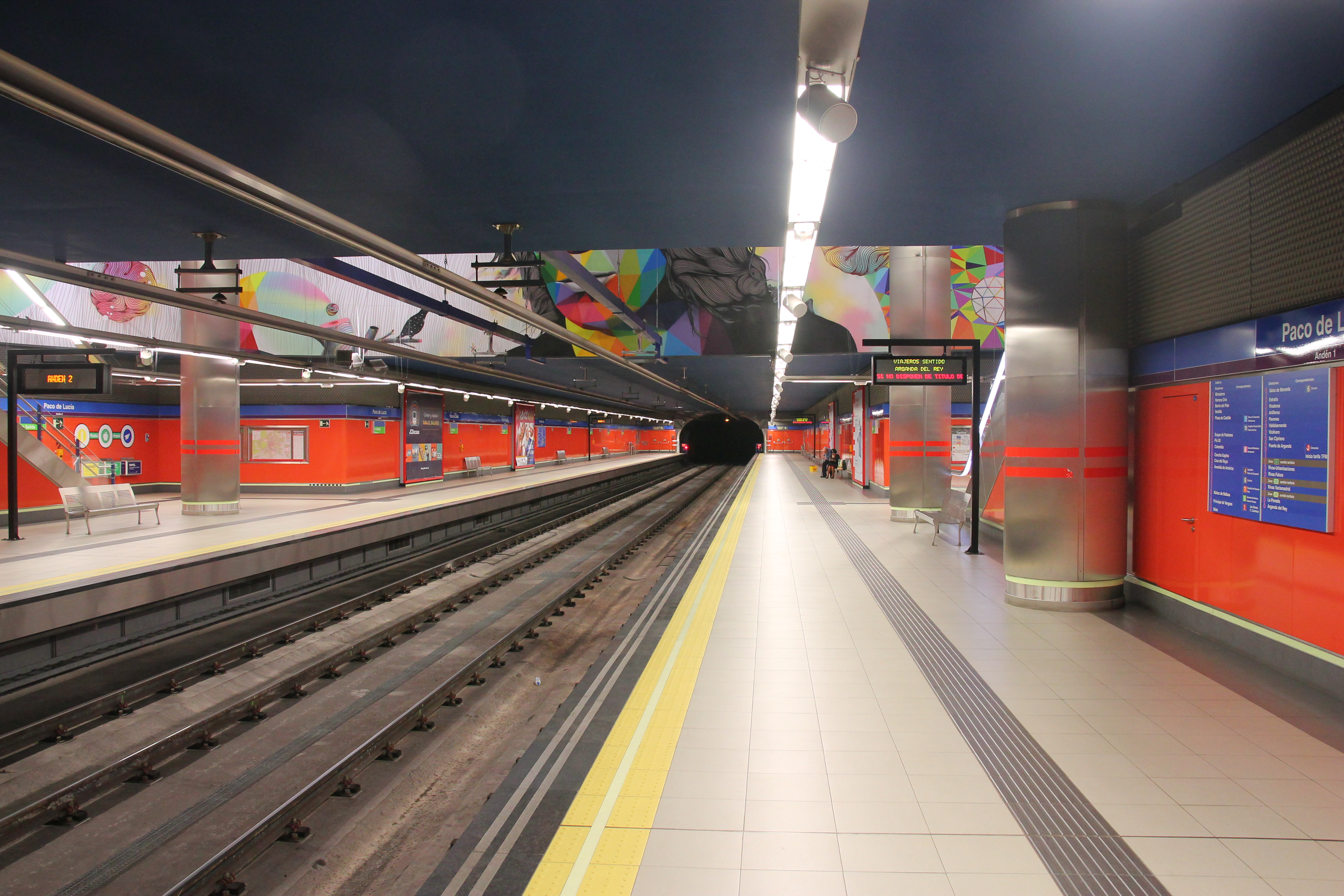
- Platforms of the station

General information
- Location: Fuencarral-El Pardo, Madrid; Spain
- Coordinates: 40.4995522°N 3.709039°W
- System: Madrid Metro station
- Owner: CRTM
- Operator: CRTM

Construction
- Accessible: yes

Other information
- Fare zone: A

History
- Opened: 25 March 2015; 11 years ago

Services
| Preceding station | Madrid Metro | Following station |
|---|---|---|
| Terminus | Line 9 | Mirasierra towards Arganda del Rey |
Out of system interchange
| Preceding station | Cercanías Madrid | Following station |
| Pitis towards Príncipe Pío | C-7 | Ramon y Cajal towards Alcalá de Henares |
| Pitis towards Santa María de la Alameda or Cercedilla | C-8 | Ramon y Cajal towards Guadalajara |
Location
- Location within Madrid

Paco de Lucía [ˈpako ðe luˈθi.a] station completes the extension of Line 9 of the Madrid Metro. It is located in fare Zone A and serves around 50.000 potential new users. It opened on 25 March 2015, becoming the 301st station in the Metro Madrid network at the time. While the station was originally to be named Costa Brava, it was ultimately named after the Spanish musician and guitarist Paco de Lucía (1947–2014), a former resident of the district in which the station is located, who died in 2014.

The new station also has a feature that makes it unique in Spain with it being the first Metro station decorated with street art, specifically a 300-square metre mural showing the face of the man it was named after. Street artists Okuda and Rosh333, in collaboration with architect Antonyo Marest and under the supervision of the Madrid Street Art Project, created the impressive work of art, which presides over the forecourt of the station.

The Cercanías Madrid station Mirasierra-Paco de Lucía, built by Adif above the Metro station, was inaugurated on 5 February 2018. It allows connection with lines C-3, C-7 and C-8.

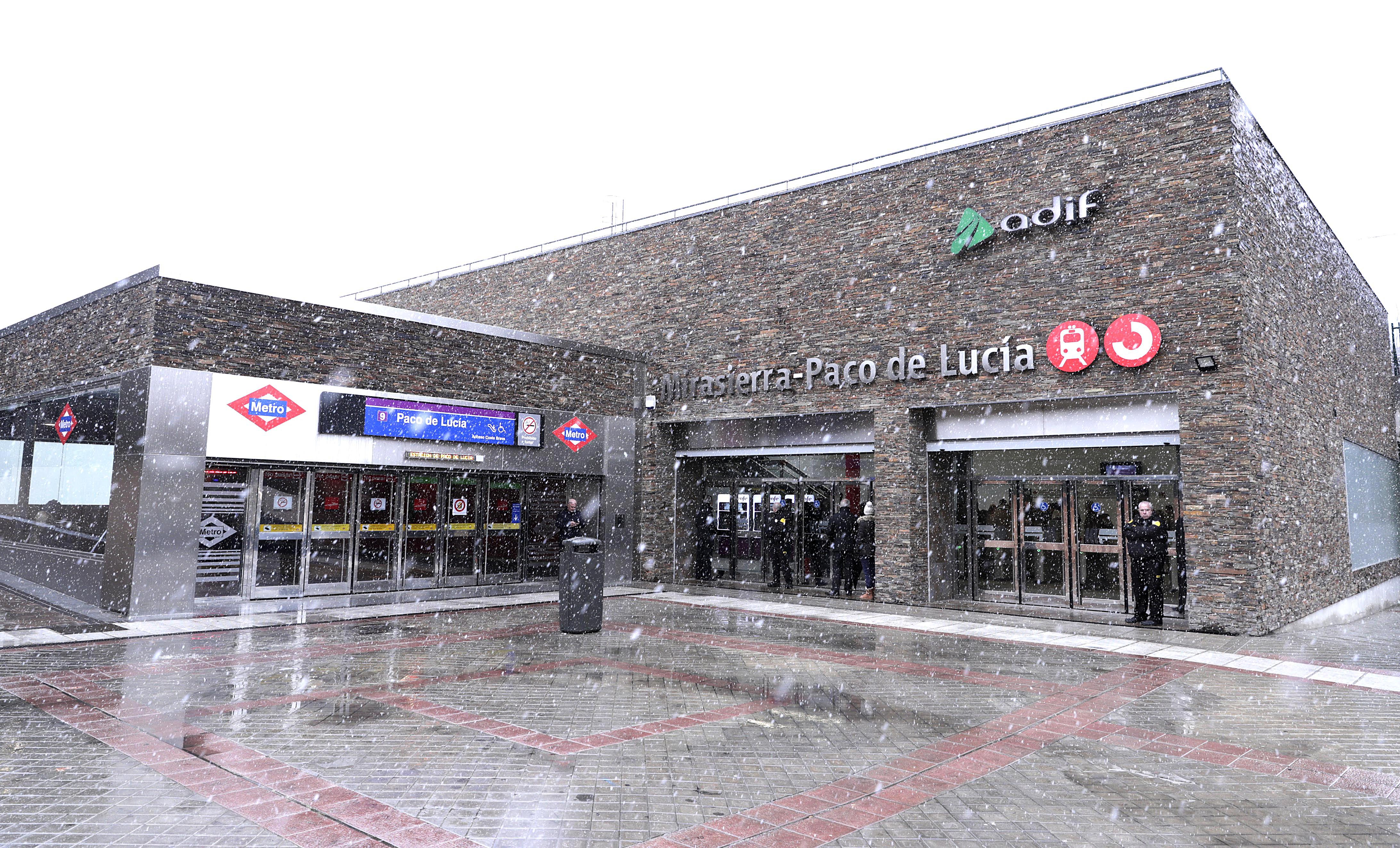
Entrance

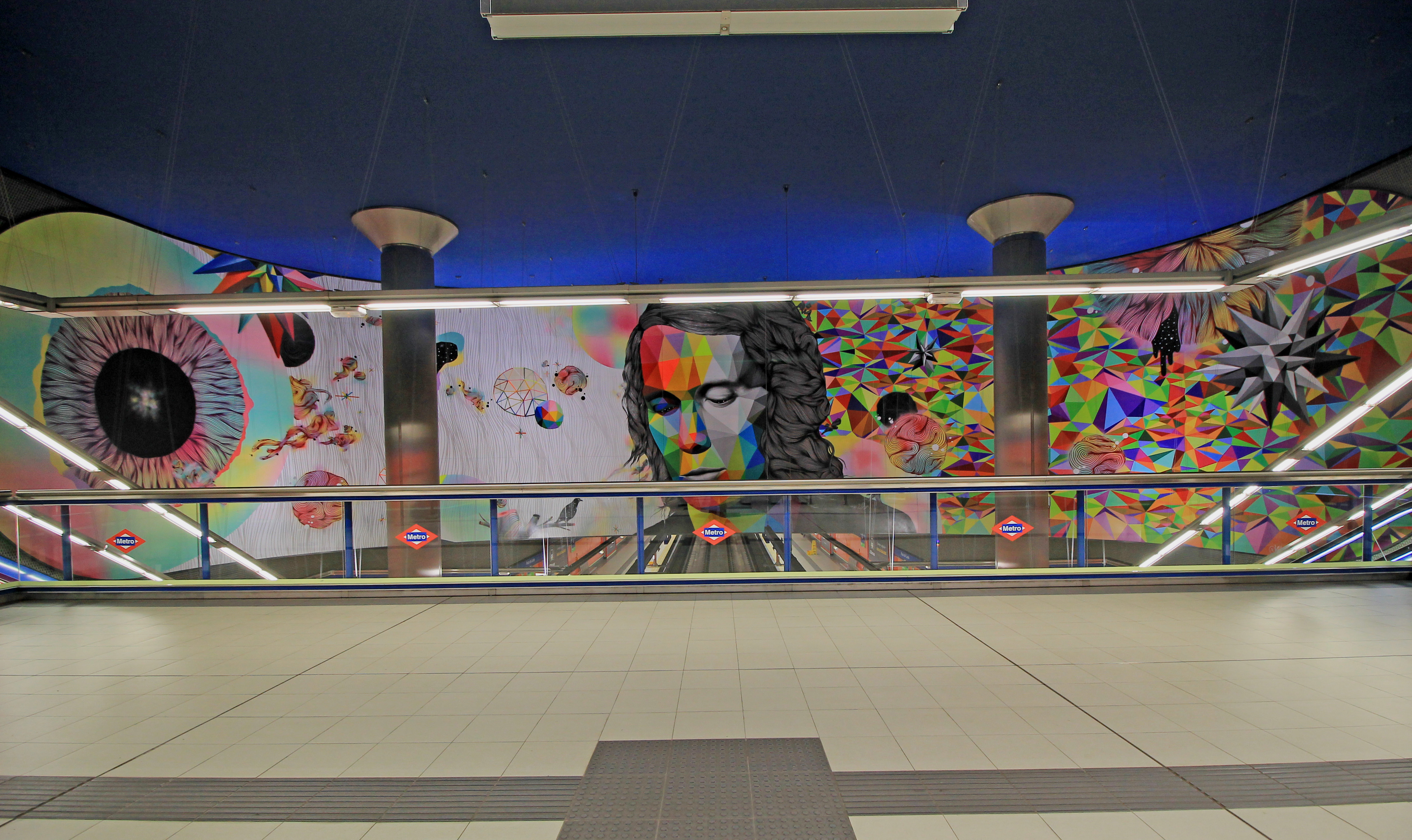
Interior of the station with artworks

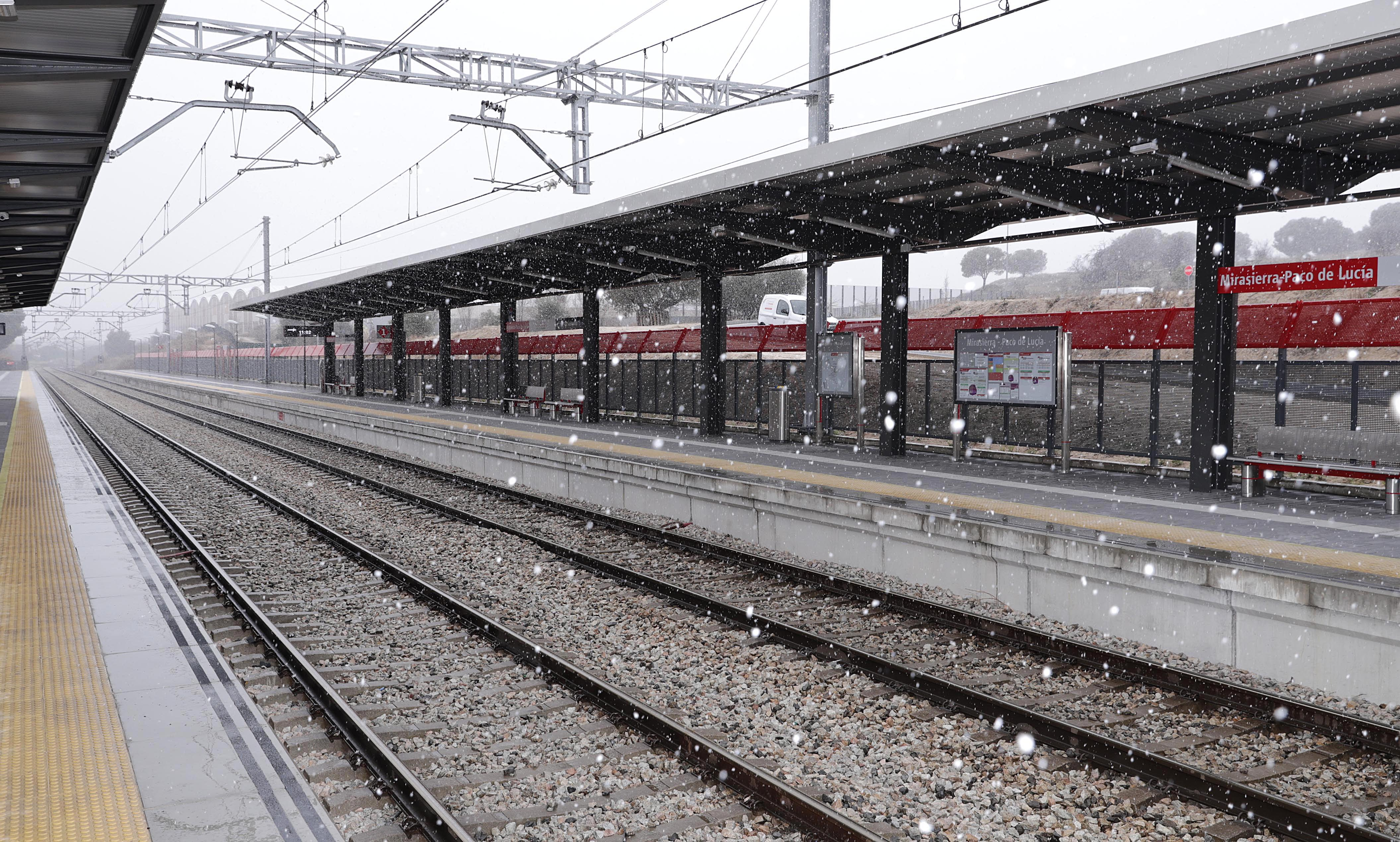
Access to the Cercanías
