= Half Janus =

Shunting Locomotive

Yorkshire Engine Company Half Janus
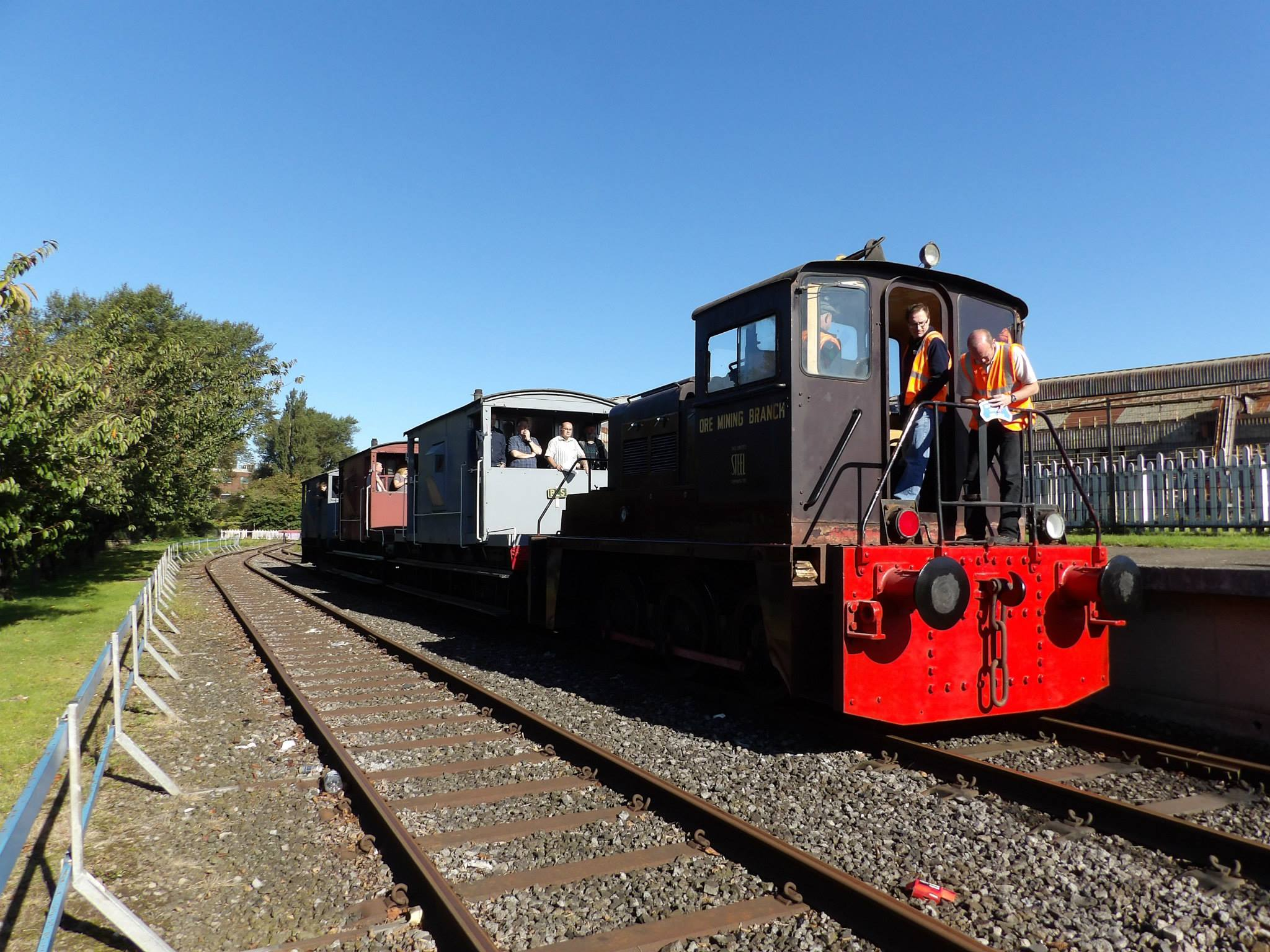
- A Yorkshire Engine Company Half Janus preserved at the Appleby Frodingham Railway Preservation Society at Scunthorpe Steelworks
Type and origin
- Power type: Diesel-electric
- Builder: Yorkshire Engine Company
- Build date: 1956–1965
Specifications
- Configuration
  - Whyte: 0-6-0DE
  - UIC: C
- Gauge: 1,435 mm (4 ft 8 1/2 in)
- Loco weight: 31 long tons (31.5 t)
- Prime mover: Rolls-Royce C6SFL
- Traction motors: British Thomson-Houston
Performance figures
- Maximum speed: 20 mph (32 km/h)
- Power output: 200 or 220 hp (150 or 160 kW)

The Yorkshire Engine Company Half Janus is a 0-6-0 wheel arrangement, diesel electric shunting locomotive which weighs 31 long tons with a maximum speed of 20 mph. The Half Janus was built by the Yorkshire Engine Company in Sheffield between 1956 and 1965.

Each locomotive was built (out of the factory) with one Rolls-Royce C6SFL 200 or 220 hp (150 or 160 kW) engine which was paired with one generator to power the British Thomson-Houston traction motor mounted to the wheel set at the back of the locomotive under the cab.

The locomotive was nicknamed the Half Janus because it had half the power and body of the Yorkshire Engine Company Janus. The Janus locomotive has two bonnets and the Half Janus has one. The Yorkshire engine company Janus got its name from the two-faced god, Janus.

== Locomotives in preservation ==
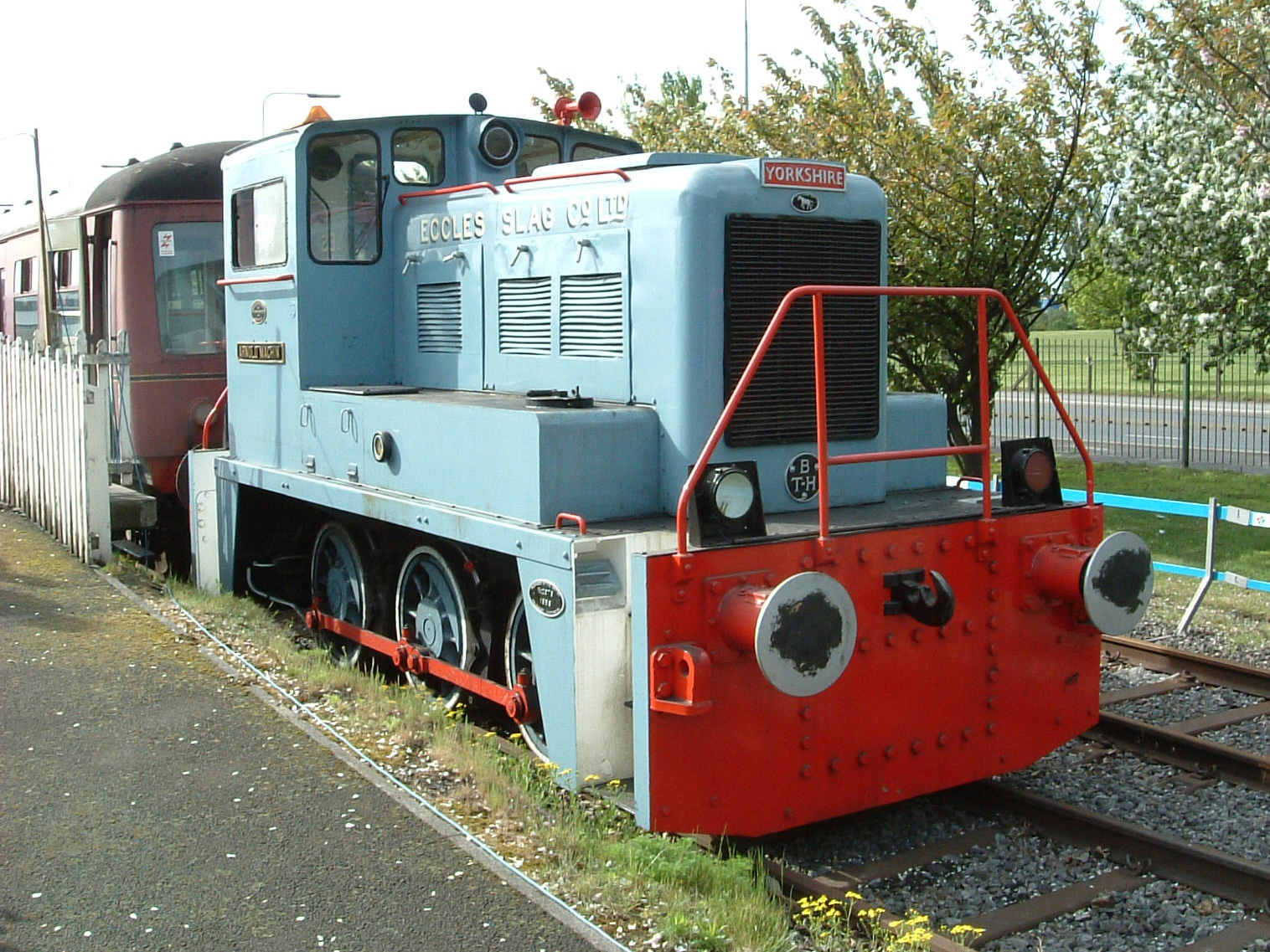
Appleby Frodingham Railway's Half Janus, nicknamed 'Arnold Machin', in 2003

There is one example of a Half Janus at the Appleby Frodingham Railway Preservation Society based at the Scunthorpe Steelworks in North Lincolnshire, another at Rocks by Rail and a third at the South Devon Railway.

One example is 'Arnold Machin', which was brought into preservation at the society from Eccles Slag Co., Ltd. The locomotive served at Scunthorpe Steelworks, Normanby Park Works run by United Steel Company at the time. 'Arnold Machin' was built with the works number '2661' in 1958. The locomotive is currently being overhauled at the society sheds.

'Arnold Machin' has a twin sister which is now located at Rocks by Rail, Loco '1382'. It is currently preserved in its Colsterworth Mines, United Steel Company Maroon livery. Loco '1382' spent most of its working life at the Colsterworth Quarries. When this closed it moved to the Scunthorpe Steelworks Normanby Park Works site until the Normanby Park Works was closed in the 1990s. The locomotive was then preserved at Rocks by Rail. It moved to the Appleby Frodingham Railway Preservation Society in May 2015 to be overhauled. The locomotive then moved to Peak Rail in August 2016, along with two other locomotives owned by Andrew Briddon. After the overhaul was completed in 2019, the locomotive moved back to Rocks by Rail where she regularly operated on opening events at the railway. In early 2024 the locomotive was purchased by a private owner who decided to move the locomotive to the Buckinghamshire Railway Centre where she currently resides and operates.
