= Madrid Delicias railway station =

Madrid Delicias railway station may refer to:

- Delicias railway station, opened 1996
- The former Delicias railway station, now the Railway Museum (Madrid)
