= Railway Museum (Madrid) =

Museum in Madrid, Spain

- Museo del Ferrocarril
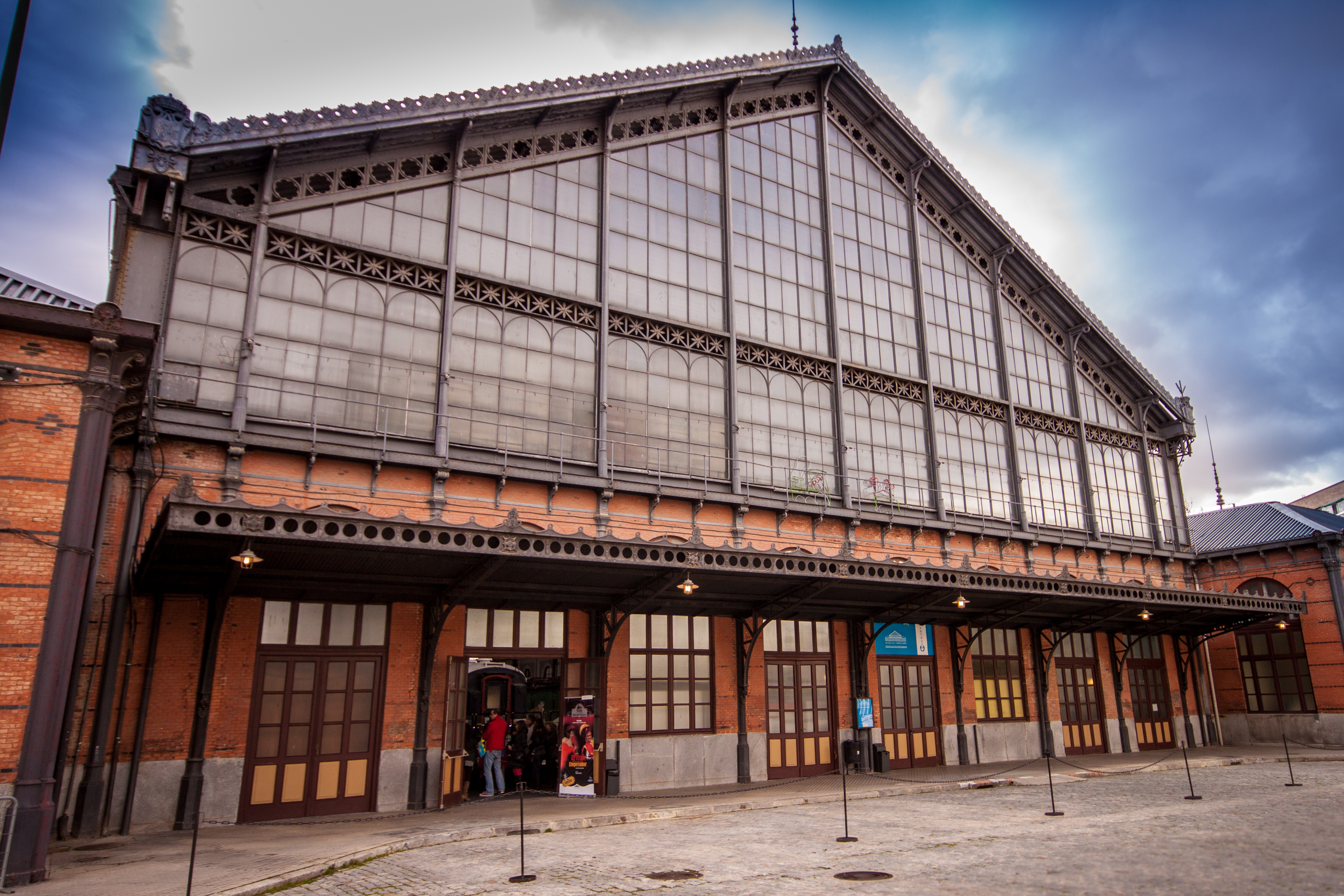
- Established: 1967 in original location 1984 in current location
- Location: Delicias Station, Paseo de las Delicias, 61, Madrid
- Coordinates: 40°23′54″N 3°41′39″W
- Director: Carlos Abellán Ruiz
- Public transit access: Delicias; Delicias (railway)
- Website: museodelferrocarril.org

The Museo del Ferrocarril (Railway Museum) in Madrid, Spain, is one of the largest historic railroad collections in Europe. It is housed in a redundant railway station called Madrid-Delicias in the barrio of Delicias. The location is near the centre of Madrid.

The railway museum opened in the Palacio de Fernán Núñez, which is now the seat of the Fundación de los Ferrocarriles Españoles. After an agreement between Renfe and the Ministry of Culture regarding the future of Las Delicias station, the collections were transferred to Las Delicias which opened as a railway museum in 1984.

== The building ==
The building is not to be confused with the station opened in 1996 by Cercanías Madrid called Delicias.

The station was opened in March 1880 by King Alfonso XII and Queen Maria Cristina. It was commissioned by a short-lived railway company, the Compañía de los Caminos de Hierro de Ciudad Real a Badajoz, which had recently opened a line from Ciudad Real to the capital. One reason for the choice of Delicias as the site of the terminus was the proximity of an existing line, the Ferrocarril de contorno de Madrid, which served industrial areas of Madrid.

In the year the station was opened, the railway company was absorbed by a larger rival, Compañía de los Ferrocarriles de Madrid a Zaragoza y Alicante (MZA). MZA had the use of Atocha station, and did not need Delicias station, which it transferred to a third company, the Compañía de los Ferrocarriles de Madrid a Cáceres y Portugal. An international service to Portugal was developed, but the station never achieved a high volume of passengers, and it closed to passenger traffic in 1969.

=== Architecture ===
As a terminus, the station had separate facilities for arriving and departing passengers. However, the most impressive feature is the iron-framed train shed covered by a single-span roof.

The building was designed by a French engineer, Émile Cachelièvre. It has been suggested that he was influenced by Henri de Dion's Galerie des Machines, one of the metal-framed buildings erected for the Exposition Universelle (1878) in Paris. The Franco-Belgian Fives group provided metal for both projects.

== Collections ==
=== Rolling stock ===
The train shed of the former station now houses historic rolling stock.

==== Steam ====
020-0231 plinthed outside the museum

Steam was used on the Spanish railways in the period 1848–1975, although the earliest locomotive in the museum dates from the 1860s.

==== Diesel ====
Locomotives in the collection include:

- Yorkshire Engine Company: Taurus

=== Signalling ===
The museum has preserved part of a hydraulic system, developed by the Italian firm Bianchi and Servettaz, which was used to control points switching and signalling at Algodor.

== Current train service ==
A partially street-running single-track connection to the national railway network has been retained to allow the addition and removal of exhibits and occasional heritage train service. One such service, the "strawberry train", runs to Aranjuez using vintage rolling stock.

== As a film set ==
The station has been used as a location in numerous films and television series. Several films set in Russia, but shot mostly in Spain, used the station as location: Dr Zhivago (1965) by David Lean, Nicholas and Alexandra (1971) by Franklin J. Schaffner and Reds (1981) by Warren Beatty. Other films filmed there include The Violet Seller (1958) by Luis César Amadori, Travels with My Aunt (1972) by George Cukor, March or Die (1977) by Dick Richards and Lovers (1991) by Vicente Aranda. Television series include Televisión Española's Cuéntame cómo pasó, Netflix's Cable Girls and Antena 3's The Time in Between and Velvet.
