= Appleby Frodingham Railway =

Railway line in England

Coordinates: 53°35′16″N 0°37′39″W

Appleby Frodingham Railway - Scunthorpe (AFR-S)
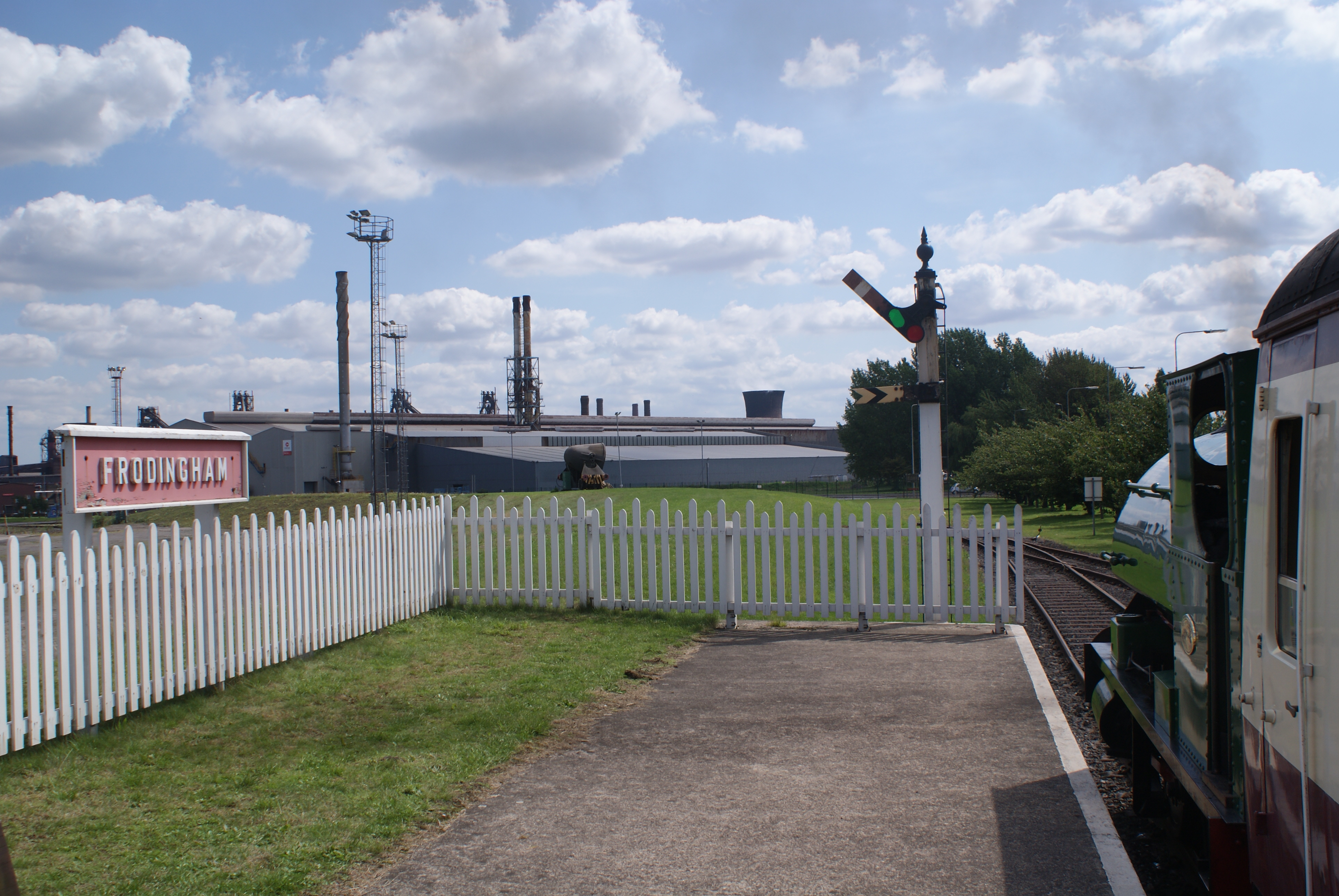
- 1912 Peckett locomotive with a train at Frodingham platform
- Locale: Scunthorpe, North Lincolnshire

Commercial operations
- Name: British Steel Limited Scunthorpe
- Original gauge: 4 ft 8 1/2 in (1,435 mm) standard gauge

Preserved operations
- Operated by: Appleby Frodingham Railway - Scunthorpe
- Preserved gauge: 4 ft 8 1/2 in (1,435 mm) standard gauge

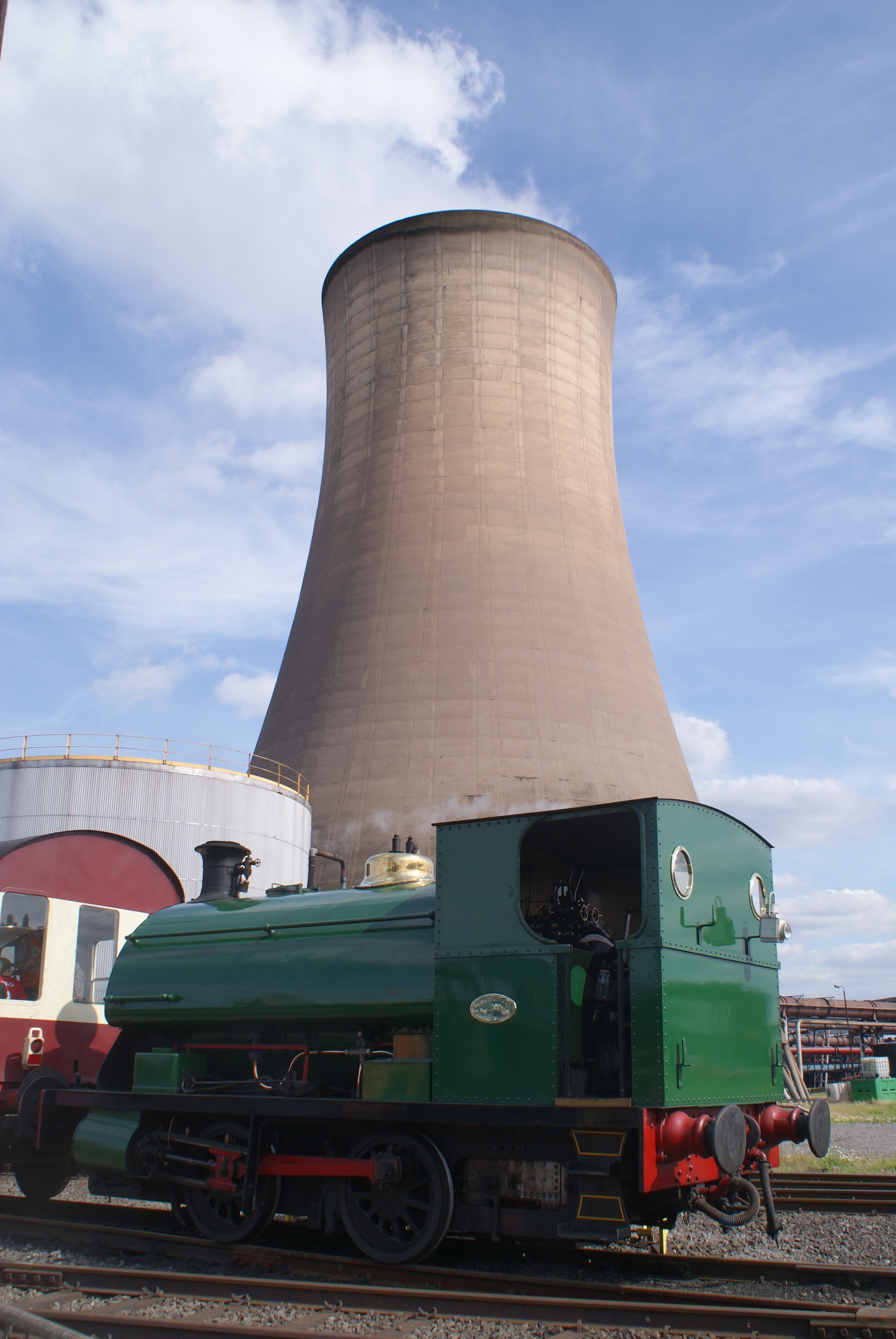
Peckett locomotive standing beside a cooling tower at Appleby loco shed

The Appleby Frodingham Railway - Scunthorpe (AFR-S) is based at Scunthorpe in North Lincolnshire. The society owns locomotives and rolling stock but not the railway it runs on. The name comes from the Appleby-Frodingham Steel Company, now known as British Steel Limited Scunthorpe after the companies buyout by Greybull Capital in 2016, and after going into compulsory liquidation in 2019, Jingye Group. The railway operates entirely within the Steelworks limits over tracks normally used for moving molten iron, steel and raw materials. Trains travel between 7 and 15 miles (11 and 24 km), all within the steelworks.

== History ==
Occasional excursion trains were run around the Scunthorpe Steel Works site (such as in 1986) using the works' own locomotives.

In 1990, British Steel PLC celebrated their 100 years of steelmaking at their plant in Scunthorpe. The works asked every department to join in with the celebrations. Keith Norris, rail traffic manager at the time, spoke with the works loco drivers and it was decided the Rail Traffic Department would borrow a steam engine and a coach to take a group of invited dignitaries around the site. After the first tour, over 100 trips were run for school children and members of the public The last trip ran in September, but requests for tours around the work kept coming in.

At the end of 1990, some of the works drivers met British Steel PLC management and asked if they could run the tours again in 1991. With this, and with management in full agreement, the idea of a railway preservation group was born.

"Bellerophon" was borrowed from the Vintage Carriage Trust at the Keighley and Worth Valley Railway. British Rail donated 2 ex-Class 108 DMU carriages to be used on rail tours. These tours were run throughout 1991, and donations collected were put towards the maintenance of the coaches and rolling stock.

1992 saw the arrival of "Arnold Machin", an 0-6-0 diesel-electric shunter from (the then) East Coast Slag Co. It was overhauled and returned to working order, whilst steam traction was provided by "Sir Berkley". This locomotive was also on loan from the Vintage Carriages Trust. Towards the end of 1992, a member saw an advert in the Railway Press for a Polish steam locomotive being sold by a Polish steelworks. With these locos being ideal for operations around the work, two members decided to visit the plant in Poland and "Hutnik" (Polish for "iron worker") was purchased and brought back to Scunthorpe.

In 1993, "Hutnik" took charge of her first train, becoming the staple motive power for the next 12 years.

In 1995, after a members' purchase, a Pecket 0-4-0 saddle tank was brought to Scunthorpe, and after receiving a full overhaul, joined "Hutnik" hauling passengers.

Since then, the society has been home to many privately owned locomotives and rolling stock, including a Bagnal 0-4-0 Diesel-hydraulic bought by a members' consortium, and a steam locomotive owned by a group of volunteers at the Derwent Valley Light Railway.

On occasions, internal steelworks (radio controlled) locomotives have also been used on passenger trains to the delight of visitors, and with many thanks to British Steel.

== Locomotives ==
Photograph	Number	Class	Name	Current Livery	Year built	Status
	No.1 (Works Number: 2877)	Yorkshire Engine Company 0-6-0DE Janus	-	Appleby Frodingham Steel Company (Apple Green)	1963	Operational
	Works Number: 3138	0-6-0T steam locomotive built by Fabryka Lokomotyw im. Feliksa Dzierzynskiego, Chrzanów, Poland	Hutnik	AFRPS Maroon	1954	Stored / awaiting cosmetic restoration
	Works Number: 2661	0-6-0DE diesel electric Half Janus locomotive built by the Yorkshire Engine Company	Arnold Machin	Eccles Slag Company, Scunthorpe (Grey)	1958	Under restoration
	Works Number 2320	0-4-0ST 14" Andrew Barclay steam locomotive	No.54	NCB Maroon	1952	Operational
	Works Number: 7409	0-6-0DH Diesel Hydraulic Hunslet	No.58 (Workington No.402)	Green with both operating numbers	1976	Under Restoration
	Works Number: 8368	0-4-0DH diesel hydraulic W. G. Bagnall locomotive built by RSH in 1962	Horsa	CEGB Goldington (Bedford)	1962	Under restoration
	No.8 (Works Number: 2369)	0-4-0ST 16" Andrew Barclay steam locomotive	-	NCB East Ayr Area	1955	Private owner. Under overhaul
	Class 144 017	BR Class 144 'Pacer' 3-Car DMU (DMS 55817 - MS 55853 - DMSL 55840)	-	Northern Rail unbranded	1986	Operational
	No.1 (Works Number: 1438)	Peckett 0-4-0ST steam locomotive	(Nechells No.1)	Nechells Power Station Green	1916	Private owner. Under restoration

== Rolling Stock ==
Photograph	Class / Type	Number(s)	Current Livery	Owner	Status
	BR Class 108 DTCL	56207	Carmine & Cream	AFR-S	Awaiting Restoration
	BR Class 108 TBSL	59245	Carmine & Cream	AFR-S	Awaiting Restoration
	Operating Department Instruction Saloon	395280 (M30106M)	Loadhaul Orange and Black	AFR-S	Under Restoration
	BR 20T Shark Ballast Plough Brake Van	DB993829 (6094)	Departmental Grey	AFR-S	Operational (Restored 2023/24)
	BR Standard 20T Brake Van	7606	BR Maroon	AFR-S	Operational
	BR Standard 20T Brake Van	B955010	Rail Express Services Red	Privately Owned	Stored (No restoration currently planned)
	BR Standard 20T Brake Van	B955160	BR Railfreight	AFR-S	Operational
	BR Standard 20T Brake Van (Chassis Only)	DB953867 (4702)	-	AFR-S	Used for Storage
	LMS 20t Goods Brake Van	295516	LMS Light Grey	Privately Owned	Operational
	MK1 Tourist Second Open Coach (Converted to a Lounge Car)	E4668	BR / GWR Chocolate & Cream	AFR-S	Stationary
	GWR Toad 20T Goods Brake Van	BW68494	-	Privately Owned	Under Restoration
	ex-Internal LUMB Mill Roller Wagon	-	Internal Grey	AFR-S / BSC	Restored / On Display
	"MELD" ex-Internal Iron Ore Hopper Wagon	197	-	AFR-S	Stored / On Display
	ex-Orgreave UCC Tar Tank Wagon	33	Orgreave Grey	AFR-S	Stored / On Display
	BR 26t Steel Mineral Wagon	B388553	Plain Grey	AFR-S	Used for Storage / On Display
	ex-Internal 4w Bolster Wagon	4023	-	AFR-S	Stored / On-Display
	ex-BR Frodingham / Internal Plate Layers Van (converted 12t Fish Van)	975329 (Internal: 6005)	BR Frodingham Red	AFR-S / BSC	Used for Storage
	ex-Internal Short Plate Wagon	4311	-	AFR-S	Used for Storage

== Special Events ==
Irregular special events are organised such as 'Diesel Days' where Corus and other visiting locomotives operated a series of trains through the day. For example, in 2003 one of each type of internal steelworks locomotive: a Yorkshire Engine Company Janus, a Hunslet Anchor Locomotive and a 'High Line locomotive', together with an EWS Class 08 were used on the Gala trains, each making one round trip of around 6 3/4 miles (10.9 km) using the societies Brake Vans and Class 108 DMU Carriages.

It is not unusual for the passenger trains to be stopped to allow steelworks trains to pass. It is sometimes possible to see trains carrying molten iron from the "Queens" - Blast Furnaces.
