= Strawberry train =

Tourist train in Spain

Tren de la Fresa
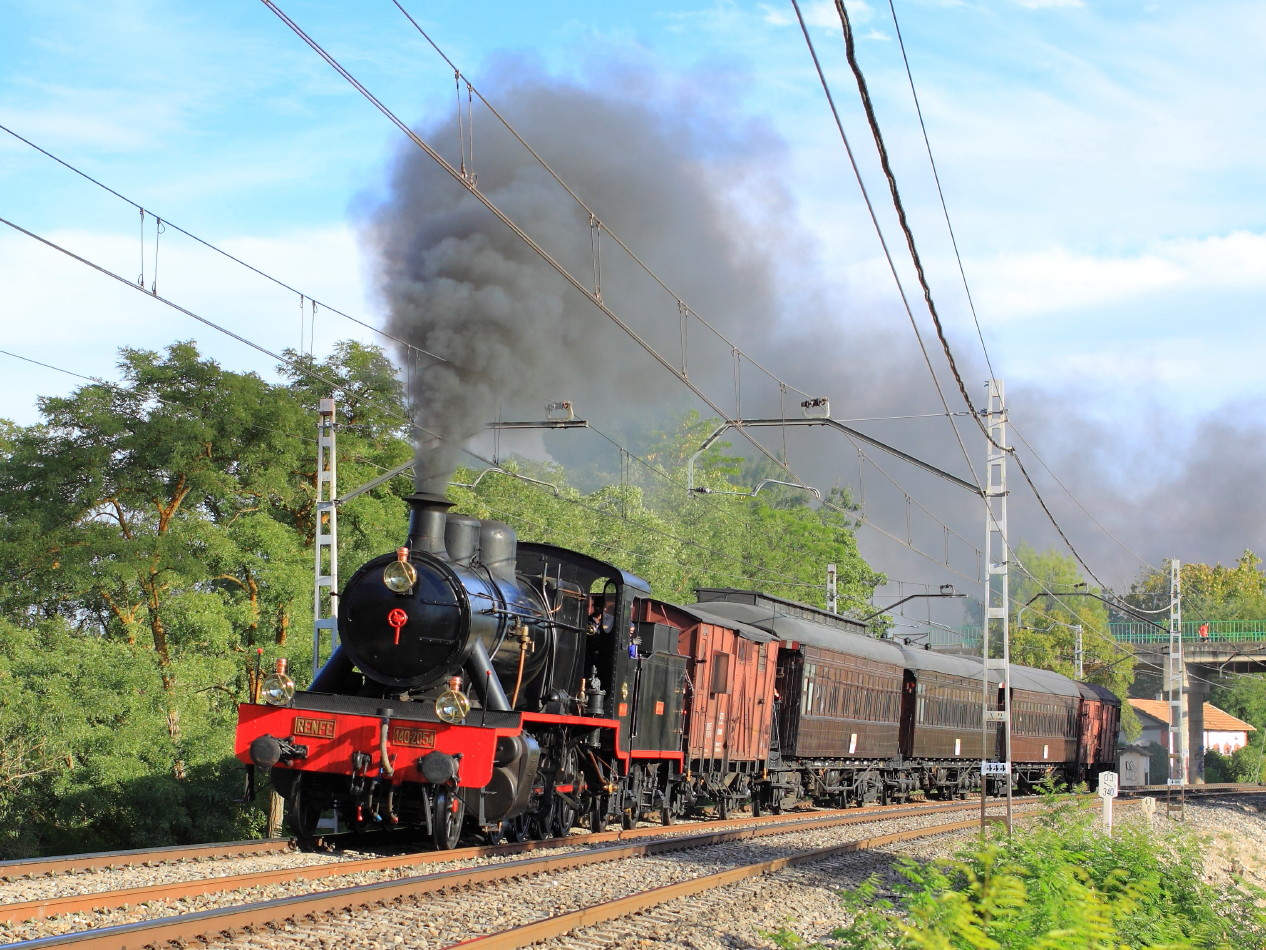
- El Tren de la Fresa pulled by a Renfe 140 series locomotive in 2012
- Locale: Spain

Commercial operations
- Built by: Sociedad del Ferrocarril de Madrid a Aranjuez
- Original gauge: Iberian gauge

Preserved operations
- Operated by: Fundación de los Ferrocarriles Españoles
- Length: 49 kilometres (30 mi)

Commercial history
- Opened: 9 February 1851
- Preserved: 27 May 1984

Website
- website

El Tren de la Fresa or the Strawberry Train is an heritage train service operated on the railway that was inaugurated on 9 February 1851 between Madrid and Aranjuez as the second railway line in mainland Spain. The original purpose of the 49 kilometres (30 mi) railway was to connect Spain's capital with the Royal Palace of Aranjuez. It was called the "Tren de la Fresa", the "Strawberry Train," as it originally went past vast fields of strawberries en route. Fresa con Nata (Strawberries with whipped cream) is a speciality produce of the town.

In the early 1980s, the Fundación de los Ferrocarriles Españoles and Renfe recovered the route with a special service for tourists with heritage rolling stock starting on 27 May 1984. The excursions run from Spring (late April or early May) to late June or early July and then again from mid-September to mid-October. The train departs from the Railway Museum housed in the old Las Delicias station, arriving fifty minutes later in Aranjuez. The return journey departs from Aranjuez at 18:25, arriving in Madrid at 19:15.

The train is usually pulled by a steam locomotive and includes 6 wooden coaches of nineteenth century vintage but for the 2013 season Renfe has declared that a conventional electric or diesel locomotive will be used to pull vintage carriages.

The ticket includes a guided visit to the historic part of Aranjuez, the Royal palace and its gardens. Passengers also receive en route a plate of the famous local strawberries from hostesses dressed in nineteenth century period costumes.
