= Archibald Sturrock =

Scottish mechanical engineer

- Born: 30 September 1816; Petruchie, Angus, Scotland
- Died: 1 January 1909 (aged 92); London, England
- Engineering career
- Discipline: Mechanical engineering

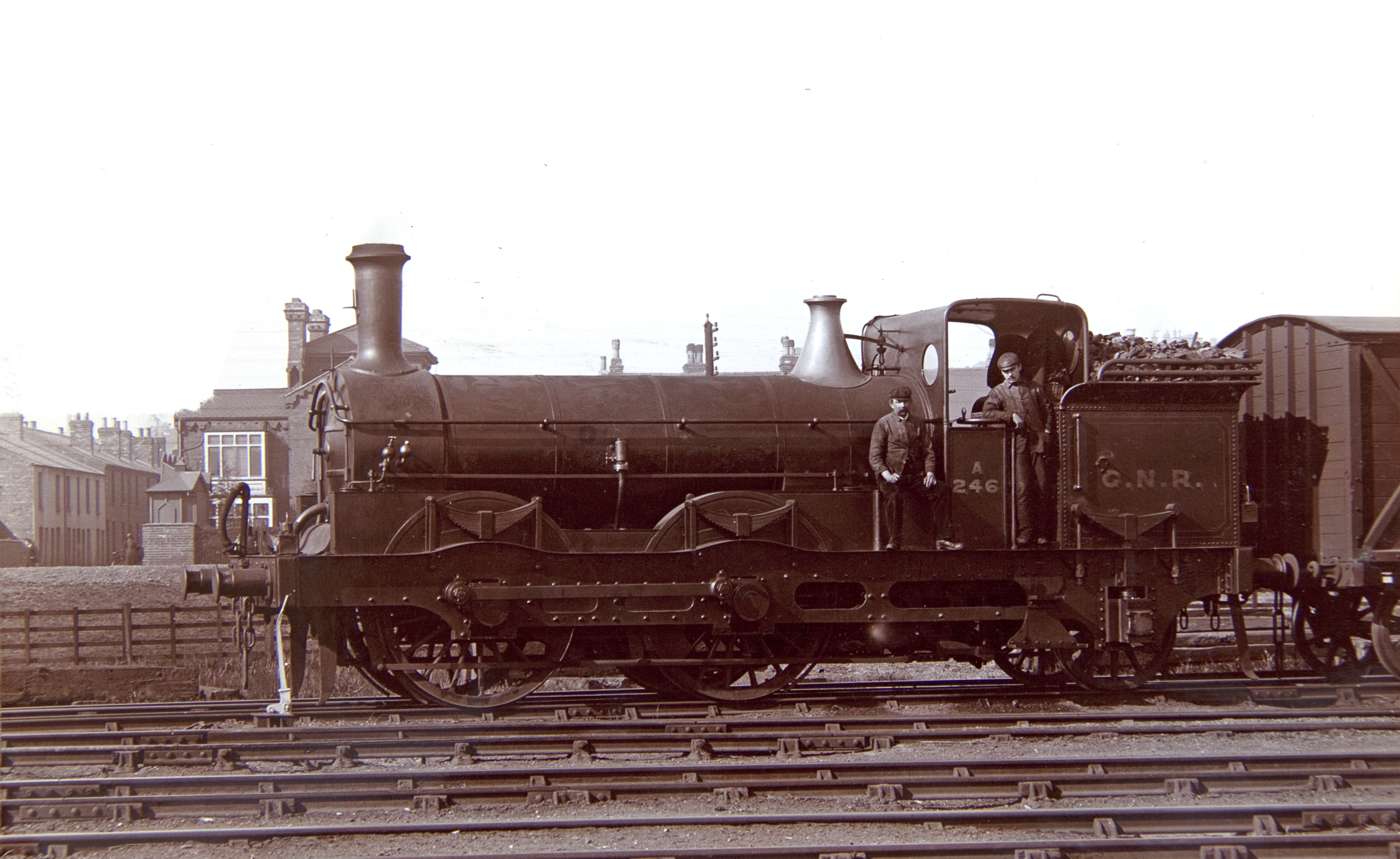
A Sturrock 0-4-2 suburban Tank Engine built for the Great Northern Railway in 1865

Archibald Sturrock (30 September 1816 – 1 January 1909) was a Scottish mechanical engineer who was born at Petruchie, Angus, Scotland. He was locomotive superintendent of the Great Northern Railway from 1850 until c. 1866, having from 1840 been Daniel Gooch's assistant on the Great Western Railway.

Archibald Sturrock is often remembered for his unsuccessful experiment with steam tenders. However, his principal achievement was the opening of the Great Northern main line and the establishment of GNR's reputation for a reliable and comfortable passenger service from London to York and beyond.

== Career ==
=== Dundee Foundry ===
Sturrock was born in 1816. His father, who was agent to the Bank of Scotland, was shocked when Sturrock, aged 15, took an apprenticeship at the Dundee Foundry. Here he was involved with the construction of a locomotive for the Dundee and Newtyle Railway and met Daniel Gooch, who was to become Locomotive Superintendent of the Great Western Railway.

=== Great Western Railway ===
Following a period with Fairbairns in Manchester, and travel abroad, Sturrock persuaded Gooch to offer him a post in the Locomotive department of the GWR in 1840. In spite of a difficult initial relationship with Brunel, Sturrock won his confidence and was appointed Works Manager at Swindon Works. Sturrock worked with Gooch, who was based in London, designing and building the Iron Duke and other GWR locomotives. When the recession of the late 1840s hit the GWR, a glowing reference from Brunel helped secure Sturrock the post of Locomotive Superintendent of the Great Northern Railway in 1850.

=== Great Northern Railway ===
During his 16 years with the GNR, Sturrock designed over a dozen classes of both passenger and goods locomotives to meet the needs of the fast-growing railway, where the transport of coal and other minerals was as important to the profitability of the line as passenger traffic. Sturrock was accountable for around 40% of expenditure and he continually battled with the chairman and board to persuade them to purchase locomotives, wagons and carriages in time to meet the growing demands of the line. In 1850 when Sturrock joined the GNR, there were 340 employees in the Locomotive Department and the locomotive mileage was 609,092. When he retired in 1866, the employees numbered 3,834 and the mileage was 4,873,113.

=== Yorkshire Engine Company ===
Sturrock had a long and active retirement in Doncaster. He was involved with the founding of the Yorkshire Engine Company and chaired the business for several years. He died in London in 1909.

Preceded by (First CME)	Chief Mechanical Engineer of Great Northern Railway; 1850–1866	Succeeded by Patrick Stirling
