= Yorkshire Engine Company Taurus and Indus =

Yorkshire Engine Company 'Taurus' and 'Indus'
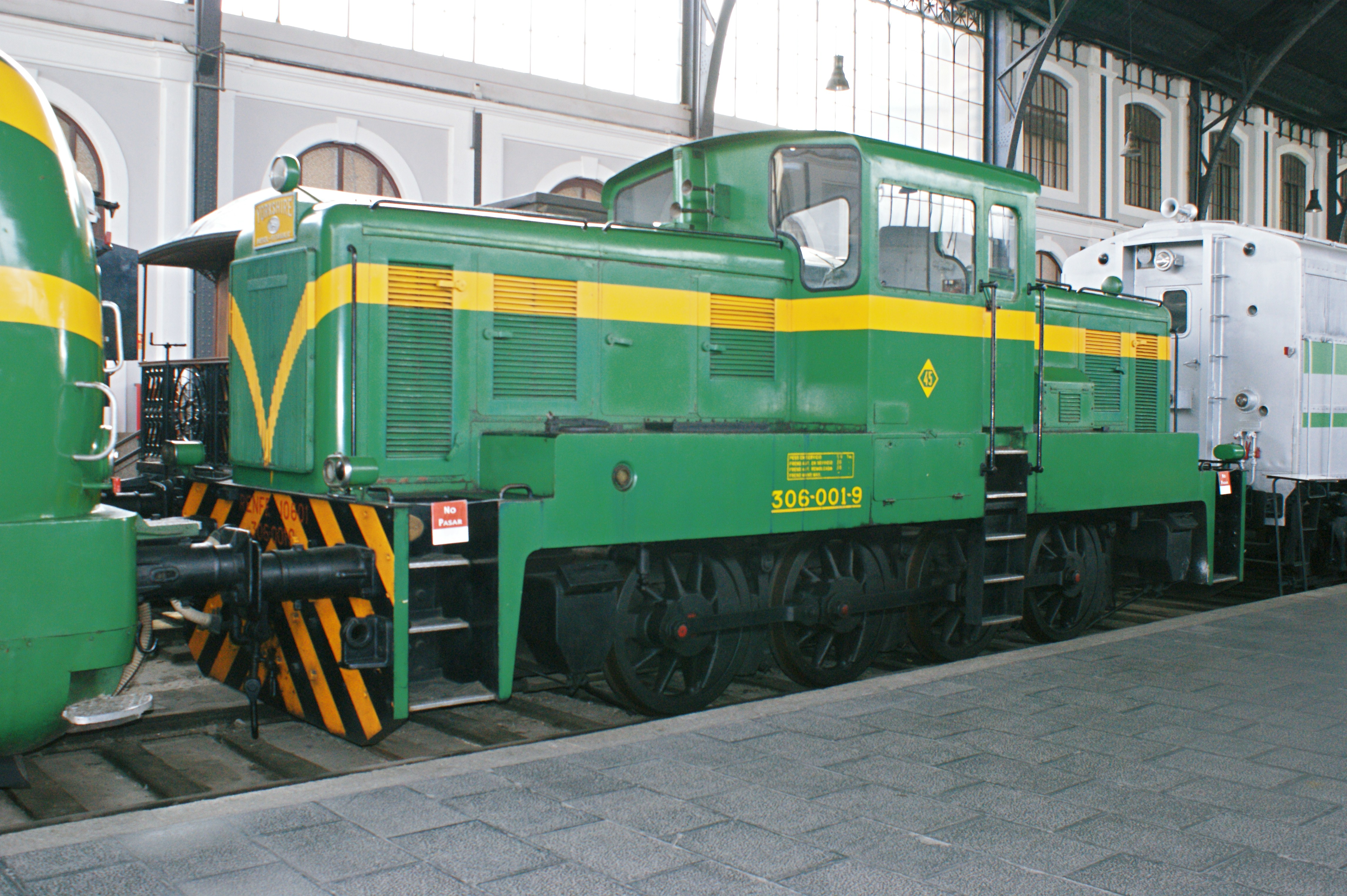
- The Spanish 'Taurus' in the Museo del Ferrocarril, Madrid
Type and origin
- Power type: Diesel-hydraulic
- Builder: Yorkshire Engine Company
- Serial number: Taurus: 2875, 2892; Indus: 2893–2894
- Model: Taurus, Indus
- Build date: 1961–1963
- Total produced: Taurus: 2 Indus: 2
Specifications
- Configuration
  - UIC: D
- Wheel diameter: 3 ft 9 in (1.143 m)
- Loco weight: 58 long tons (59 t)
- Prime mover: Two Rolls-Royce C8SFL engines
Performance figures
- Maximum speed: Taurus: 56 mph (90 km/h)
- Power output: 600 hp (450 kW)
- Tractive effort: Taurus: 45,000 lbf (200.2 kN)
Career
- Disposition: One Taurus preserved, remainder scrapped

The Yorkshire Engine Company Taurus and Indus locomotives were two very similar lines of 0-8-0, diesel-hydraulic locomotives that weighed 58 tons and had a maximum speed of 36 mph (58 km/h). The two Rolls-Royce C8SFL diesel engines gave a total of 600 hp (450 kW). The transmission of the Taurus locomotives worked on a similar principle to that of the Fell diesel tested during the early 1950s. In this case at low speeds only one engine was used, the second being engaged between 3.5 mph (5.6 km/h) and 15 mph (24 km/h) to enable haulage of 300–500 ton loads at speeds of up to 36 mph. The maximum speed with one engine was 12 mph (19 km/h) while the minimum speed with both engines was 3.5 mph. Both engines drove to a common torque converter and used a common throttle control with a separate lever being provided to engage the second engine as the need arose.

It would appear that the name came from Taurus the bull while maintaining the ‘….us' theme of Yorkshire Engine Company locomotive types (Janus, Olympus, Taurus, Indus).

The first Taurus (works number 2875) was demonstrated and tested on British Railways during 1961 and 1962 and a builders sectioned elevation drawing of the machine appeared in the July 1961 issue of Trains Illustrated Magazine. Taurus was a 'trip' locomotive intended to carry out shunting work and hauling local (short distance) goods trains. This was the duty for which the British Rail Class 14 locomotives were built in 1964–65. When the latter started to become available on the secondhand market in 1968, the market for new heavy duty industrial locomotives was severely affected.

Following the trials, the Taurus was returned to the manufacturer's works in Sheffield and was dismantled, leaving only the chassis (which was scrapped in 1965).

Two Indus locomotives were built in August 1962 – one for Richard Thomas and Baldwins’ Llanwern steelworks, the other for Stewarts & Lloyds Corby system. The main difference between the Indus and Taurus was in the type of hydraulic transmission – the Taurus used a differential compounding gearbox, while the Indus used a simple compounding gearbox. These two locomotives differed in detail; the Stewarts Lloyd locomotive (works number 2894) was still extant at the British Steel Corby site, albeit out of use, until at least 1983.

A second Taurus locomotive was built for RENFE, the national Spanish railway network, to a gauge of 1,668 mm or 5 ft 5 21/32 in. It is possible (but not proven) that all the components from the British Rail demonstrator were transferred from the standard gauge chassis onto the wider chassis for Spain. (A works number is usually allocated to the chassis/frame, so it is appropriate that the demonstrator No. 2875 has a different works number from the Spanish locomotive No. 2892, even if many parts were reused.)

An anticipated follow-on order from RENFE did not materialise. They had experienced problems with the gearbox, so YEC changed it for the type used in the Indus, effectively converting it to one, which changed the top speed and tractive effort and reduced its usefulness.

The Spanish Taurus locomotive survives in the Museo del Ferrocarril in Madrid.
