= YEC (car) =

YEC (Yorkshire Engine Company) was a British motor car. Approximately 50 cars were manufactured in Sheffield from 1907–1908.

== History ==
The Yorkshire Engine Company originally made trams and steam locomotives, but in 1907 began production of automobiles branded "YEC". They used Daimler engines, but a legal dispute with the Daimler-Motoren-Gesellschaft ended production in 1908 after approximately 50 vehicles had been built.

== Models ==
Sources describe a 30 HP Mercedes engine model, with front mounted engine and chain-drive to the rear axle; and a model with a 31/55 HP, 8 litre, four-cylinder engine which appeared in 1909.
