= GWR 9400 Class =

British steam locomotive class (1947–1965)

Great Western Railway 9400 class
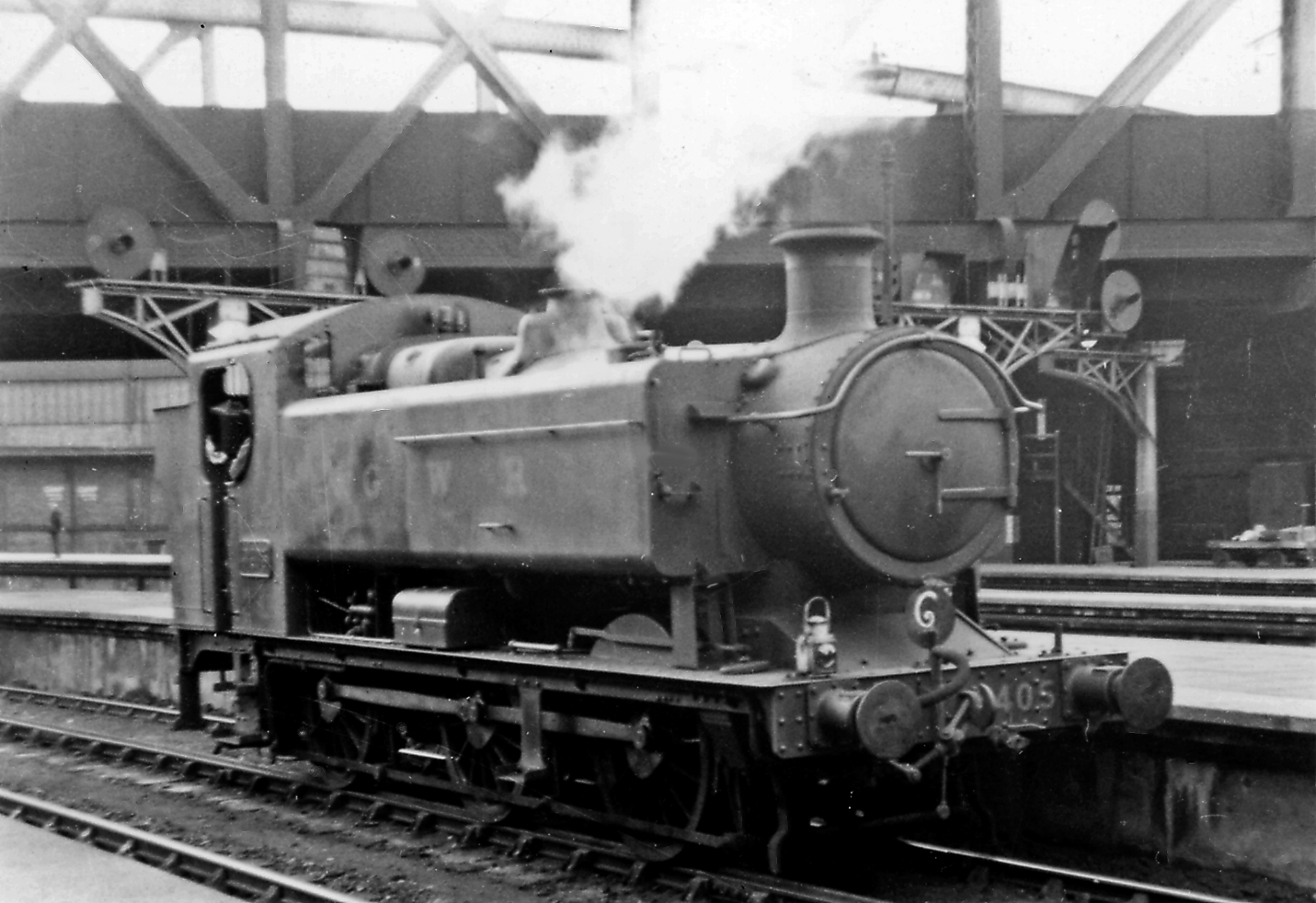
- 9405 at Paddington in 1947
Type and origin
- Power type: Steam
- Designer: Frederick Hawksworth
- Builder: Swindon Works (10); R. Stephenson & Hawthorns (100); W. G. Bagnall (50); Yorkshire Engine Company (50)
- Order number: GWR Lot Nos. 365, 382–387
- Serial number: RSH: 7450–69, 7547–96, 7611–40; WGB: 2910–2959; YEC: 2443–72, 2544–53, 2575–84
- Build date: 1947–1956
- Total produced: 210
Specifications
- Configuration
  - Whyte: 0-6-0PT
  - UIC: C h2t (10); C n2t (200)
- Gauge: 4 ft 8 1/2 in (1,435 mm) standard gauge
- Driver dia.: 4 ft 7 1/2 in (1.410 m)
- Minimum curve: 5 chains (330 ft; 100 m) normal, 4.5 chains (300 ft; 91 m) slow
- Wheelbase: 15 ft 6 in (4.72 m)
- Length: 33 ft 2 in (10.11 m) over buffers
- Width: 8 ft 7 in (2.616 m)
- Height: 12 ft 5 1/2 in (3.797 m)
- Axle load: 19 long tons 5 cwt (43,100 lb or 19.6 t) (21.6 short tons) full
- Loco weight: 55 long tons 7 cwt (124,000 lb or 56.2 t) (62.0 short tons) full
- Fuel type: Coal
- Water cap.: 1,300 imp gal (5,900 L; 1,600 US gal)
- Firebox
  - Grate area: 17.40 sq ft (1.617 m^{2})
- Boiler: GWR Standard No. 10
- Boiler pressure: 200 lbf/in^{2} (1.38 MPa)
- Heating surface
  - Firebox: 101.7 sq ft (9.45 m^{2})
  - Tubes: 1,245.7 sq ft (115.73 m^{2})
  - Total surface: 1,347 sq ft (125.1 m^{2})
- Cylinders: Two, inside
- Cylinder size: 17 1/2 in × 24 in (444 mm × 610 mm)
Performance figures
- Tractive effort: 22,515 lbf (100.15 kN)
Career
- Operators: Great Western Railway; British Railways
- Class: 9400 or 94XX
- Power class: GWR: C; BR: 4F
- Numbers: 9400–9499, 8400–8499, 3400–3409
- Axle load class: GWR: Red
- Locale: Western Region
- Withdrawn: 1959–1965
- Preserved: 9400, 9466
- Disposition: Two preserved, remainder scrapped

The Great Western Railway (GWR) 9400 Class is a class of 0-6-0PT pannier tank steam locomotive, used for shunting and banking duties.

The first ten 9400s were the last steam engines built by the GWR. After nationalisation in 1948, another 200 were built by private contractors for British Railways (BR). Most had very short working lives as the duties for which they were designed disappeared through changes in working practices or were taken over by diesel locomotives. Two locomotives survived into preservation, with the oldest of the class, 9400 as part of the National Collection.

== Design ==
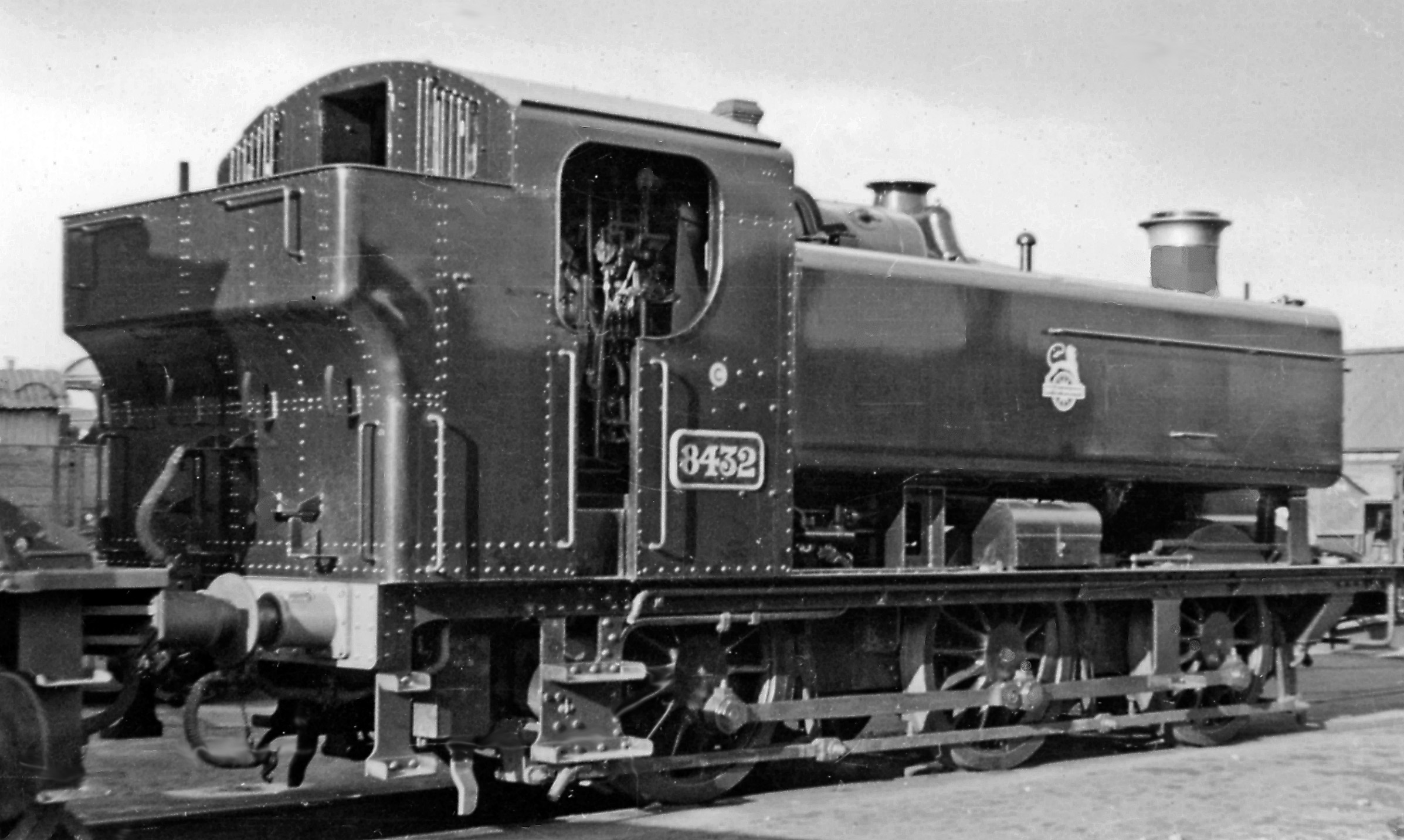
Newly built 8432 in 1953.

The 9400 class was the final development in a long lineage of tank locomotives that can be directly traced to the 645 Class of 1872. Over the decades details altered, the most significant being the adoption of Belpaire fireboxes necessitating pannier tanks.

The 9400 resembled a pannier tank version of the 2251 class, and indeed shared the same boiler and cylinders as the 2251, but was in fact a taper-boilered development of the 8750 subgroup of the 5700 class. The advantage was a useful increase in boiler power, but there was a significant weight penalty that restricted route availability. The 10 GWR-built locomotives had superheaters but the remainder did not.

The 9400s were numbered 9400–9499, 8400–8499 and 3400–3409. BR gave them the power classification 4F.

== Build details ==
Table of orders and numbers
Lot No.	Fleet Nos.	Manufacturer	Serial Nos.	Date	Notes
365	9400–9409	Swindon Works	—	1947	
382	9410–9459	Robert Stephenson and Hawthorns	7547–7596	1950–1951	
383	9460–9489	Robert Stephenson and Hawthorns	7611–7640	1950–1953	
384	8400–8449	W. G. Bagnall	2910–2959	1949–1954	
385	8450–8479	Yorkshire Engine Company	2443–65/67–71/66/72	1949–1952	
386	8480–8499	Robert Stephenson and Hawthorns	7450–7469	1952	under subcontract from Hudswell Clarke
387	9490–9499	Yorkshire Engine Company	2544–2553	1954–1955	under subcontract from Hunslet Engine Company
387	3400–3409	Yorkshire Engine Company	2575–2584	1955–1956	under subcontract from Hunslet Engine Company

No. 3409 was the last steam locomotive built for British mainline use by private contractors, as well as the last steam locomotive built for British Railways to a pre-nationalisation design. It was ordered by GWR in December 1947 and delivered by Yorkshire Engine Company in October 1956.

== Operations ==
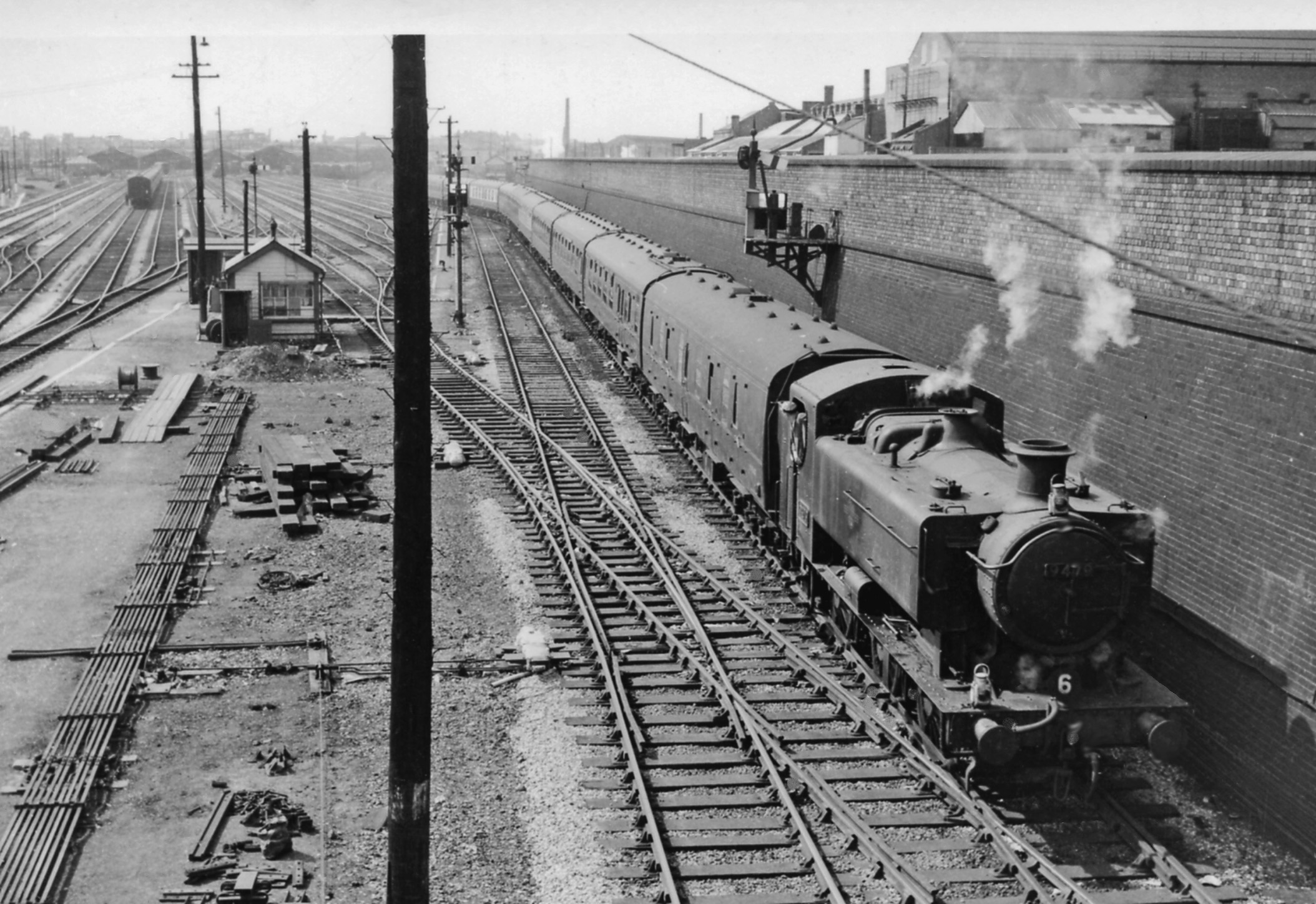
9474 ECS working into Paddington

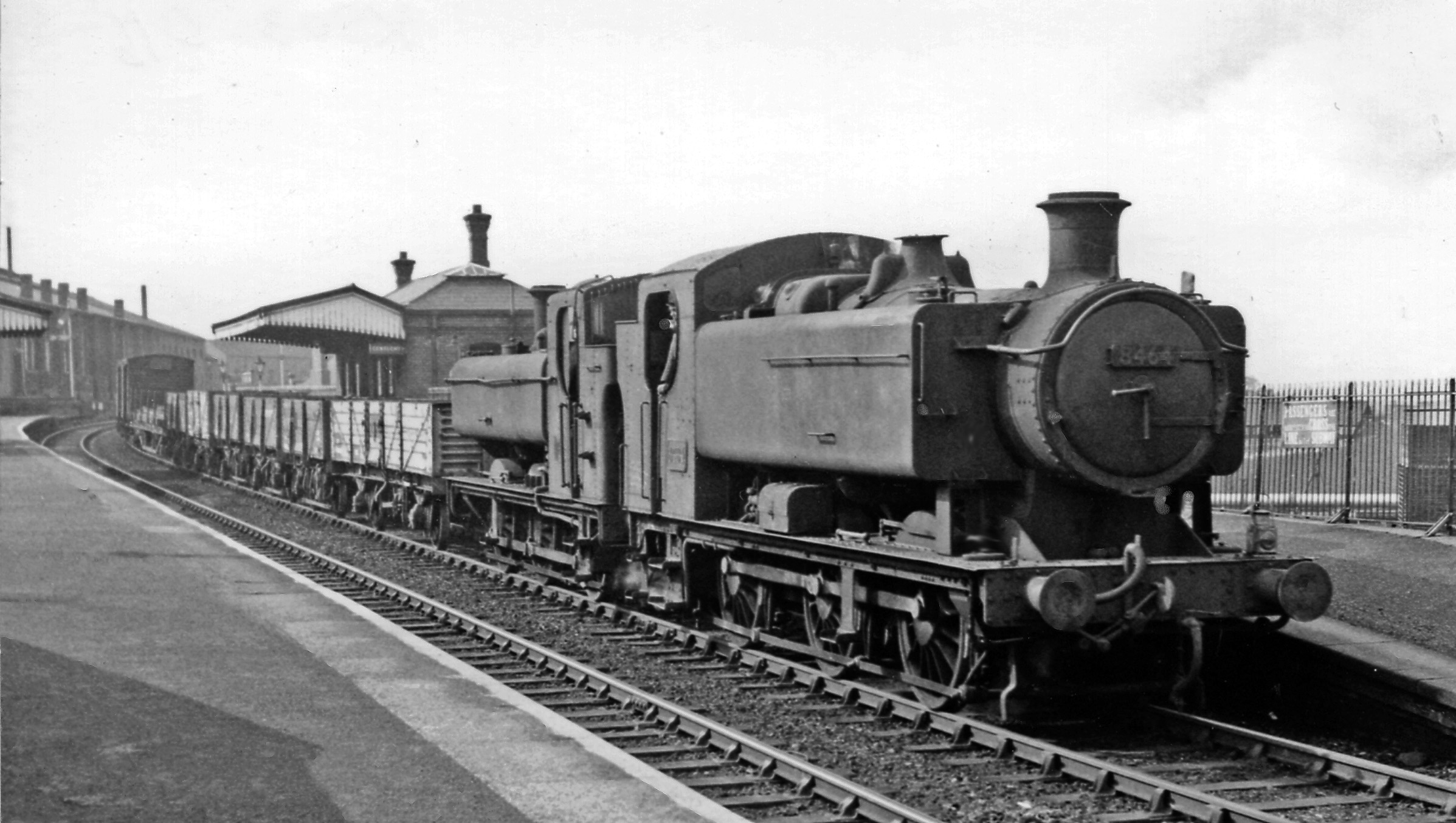
8464 with a freight train

The 9400 Class migrated to most parts of the former GWR, with many based in South Wales and at Old Oak Common. Here they were used on Paddington empty stock work until the end of steam on the Western Region in 1965. A common sight on the departure side in 1964–1965 was a worn down 9400 Class locomotive without number plates waiting with a line of Mark 1 coaches.

Numbers 8400 to 8406 served as bank engines on the Lickey Incline after its transferral to the Western Region.

== Preservation ==
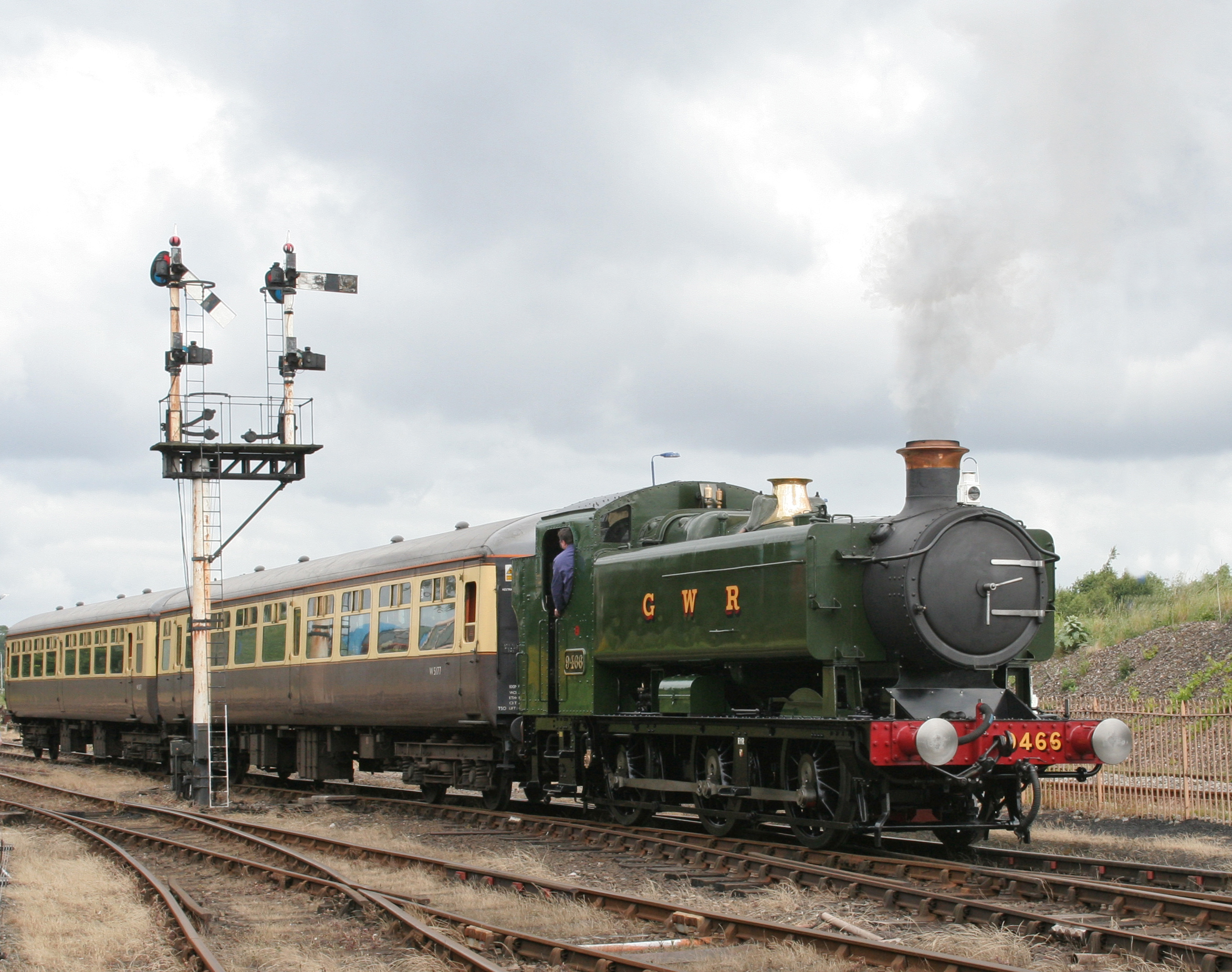
9466 at Tyseley

Two have been preserved:

GWR/BR No.	TOPS No.	Home base	Notes	Image
9400	n/a	Swindon Steam Railway Museum	Part of the National Railway Collection	9400 in the steam museum
9466	98466	West Somerset Railway	The locomotive is operational and mainline certified. Frequent visitor to the Mid-Norfolk Railway, the Metropolitan Line and other lines running charters, including a special funeral train for its owner. Formerly based at the Buckinghamshire Railway Centre privately owned by Dennis B Howells until his death in 2018, the locomotive was subsequently sold to JJP Holdings South West Ltd and was based at the West Somerset Railway after a short return visit to the Mid-Norfolk Railway. It was resident at the Ecclesbourne Valley Railway where it was to remain until its boiler ticket expires at the end of 2025. It has since moved back to the West Somerset Railway in early 2022 following analysis of weight restrictions on the line which concluded that the locomotive was safe to operate on the line once again. It will operate on the West Somerset Railway until its boiler ticket expires in 2025.	9466 Didcot

== See also ==
- GWR 0-6-0PT – list of classes of GWR 0-6-0 pannier tank, including table of preserved locomotives
