= Yorkshire Engine Company Janus =

English diesel shunting locomotive class

Yorkshire Engine Company ‘Janus’
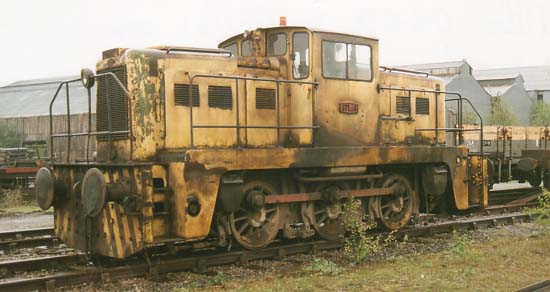
- Janus 2787 'Atlas' at Shelton Steelworks
Type and origin
- Power type: Diesel–electric
- Builder: Yorkshire Engine Company
- Model: Janus
- Build date: 1956–1965
- Total produced: 102
Specifications
- Configuration
  - UIC: C
- Wheel diameter: 3 ft 8 in (1.118 m)
- Loco weight: 48 long tons (49 t; 54 short tons)
- Prime mover: 2 Rolls-Royce C6SFL engines
- Traction motors: British Thomson-Houston
Performance figures
- Maximum speed: 23 mph (37 km/h)
- Power output: 400 hp (300 kW)
- Tractive effort: 30,000 lbf (133.4 kN)

The Yorkshire Engine Company Janus is a line of 0-6-0 wheel arrangement, diesel–electric locomotives that weighed 48 long tons (49 tonnes; 54 short tons) and had a maximum speed of 23 mph (37 km/h). The two Rolls-Royce C6SFL diesel engines gave a total power output of 400 hp (300 kW). Each engine had its cooling system at the outer end, and its generator at the inner end. There were two traction motors, each being powered by one generator, thus simplifying the electrical system.

== Service ==
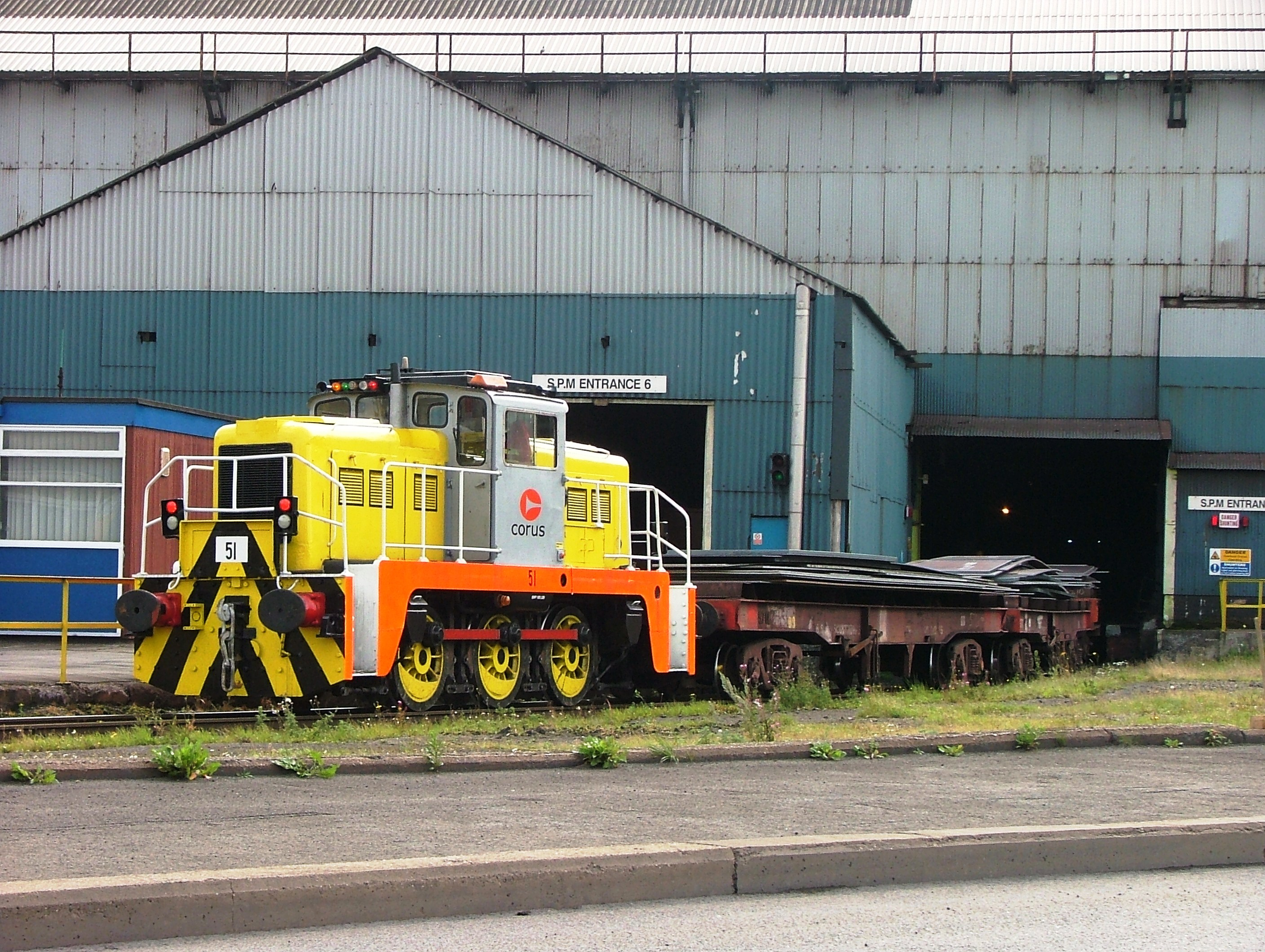
Janus type locomotive 51 at Corus' Scunthorpe Steelworks 2009

A total of 102 Janus locomotives were built: mostly for the British steel industry, but other customers included Imperial Chemical Industries (12 locomotives), the Port of London Authority (10), and the National Coal Board (7). Three locomotives were exported: one to Jamaica, and two to the Indian Fertilizer Corporation. The Indian locomotives were 1,000 mm (3 ft 3 3/8 in) metre gauge, and were the only narrow gauge units built. In addition, three modified Janus locomotives – 3 ft 6 in (1,067 mm) gauge on Bo-Bo trucks – were exported to British Guyana.

Later locomotives had their Rolls-Royce engine uprated by 10 per cent to 220 hp (160 kW) each. After Rolls-Royce entered the industrial locomotive manufacturing business, YEC started to offer their locomotives with Cummins diesel engines; seven Janus locomotives were built with pairs of 250 hp (190 kW) Cummins diesels – all for Appleby Frodingham Steel works.

The name Janus is from the two-faced god Janus: the locomotive was symmetrical with two 'faces'. The similarity in power and speed would indicate that this type of locomotive could have been used in a similar role to the British Rail Class 08 shunter. In recent years the Class 08 shunters owned by DB Cargo UK have replaced Janus locomotives on some industrial railways.

== Loans to British Railways ==
One locomotive was demonstrated to British Railways; it was the second of this type built (works number 2595 of 1956), both the first two locomotives being demonstrated to potential customers before going to the Appleby-Frodingham Steel works in Scunthorpe. It is thought to have been in use there until being scrapped in 1982.

=== Other locomotives loaned ===
In July 1961, an 0-6-0 diesel–hydraulic locomotive was demonstrated on British Railways. It weighed 40 long tons (41 t; 45 short tons) and was powered by a single Rolls-Royce C8SFL engine giving 300 hp (220 kW). The design was similar to a lengthened British Rail Class 02. The locomotive was tested near Derby for four days, and following the demonstration was delivered to Llanwern steelworks, Newport.

One 600 hp 0-8-0 diesel hydraulic, a Taurus, was demonstrated and tested on British Railways during 1961 and 1962. It was a ‘trip’ locomotive intended to carry out shunting work and hauling local (short distance) goods trains. This was the duty for which the British Rail Class 14 locomotives were built in 1963.

== Preservation ==
In 2008, 23 were still in industrial service, and seven had been preserved. In November 2016 the seven Cummins engined locomotives at Scunthorpe British Steel works, formerly Appleby Froddingham Steel works, were replaced by German-made NSB Di 8 locomotives, originally built for use on main-line freight operations in Norway.

YE 2868 0-6-0DE Ludstone has been undergoing restoration since 2015 at the Foxfield Railway in collaboration with the Industrial Diesel & Railway Preservation Group.

YE 2791 DE5, built in 1962, is cosmetically restored and on display at Rocks by Rail, The Living Ironstone Museum, Cottesmore.

YE 2670, built in September 1959, which worked at Stanton Iron Works, Ilkeston, is preserved at Stainmore Railway Company.

YE 2748 (NCB Number 6), built in 1959 and allocated to Littleton Colliery is in use at Churnet Valley Railway where it is employed on shunting duties. It has been named Roger H Bennett, after Roger Bennett, a volunteer on the Churnet Valley Railway.

YE 2877 (BSC Scunthorpe Works No: 1) is in operation at the Appleby Frodingham Railway.

== Models ==
In 2016 Oxford Diecast, in conjunction with Golden Valley Hobbies produced a OO gauge model, with a choice of BP, National Coal Board, Imperial Chemical Industries, Port of London Authority, and Allied Steel and Wire livery.

A finescale etched kit is also available from Judith Edge and can be built to 00, EM and P4 gauges.
