= Delicias railway station =

Railway station in Madrid, Spain

Delicias
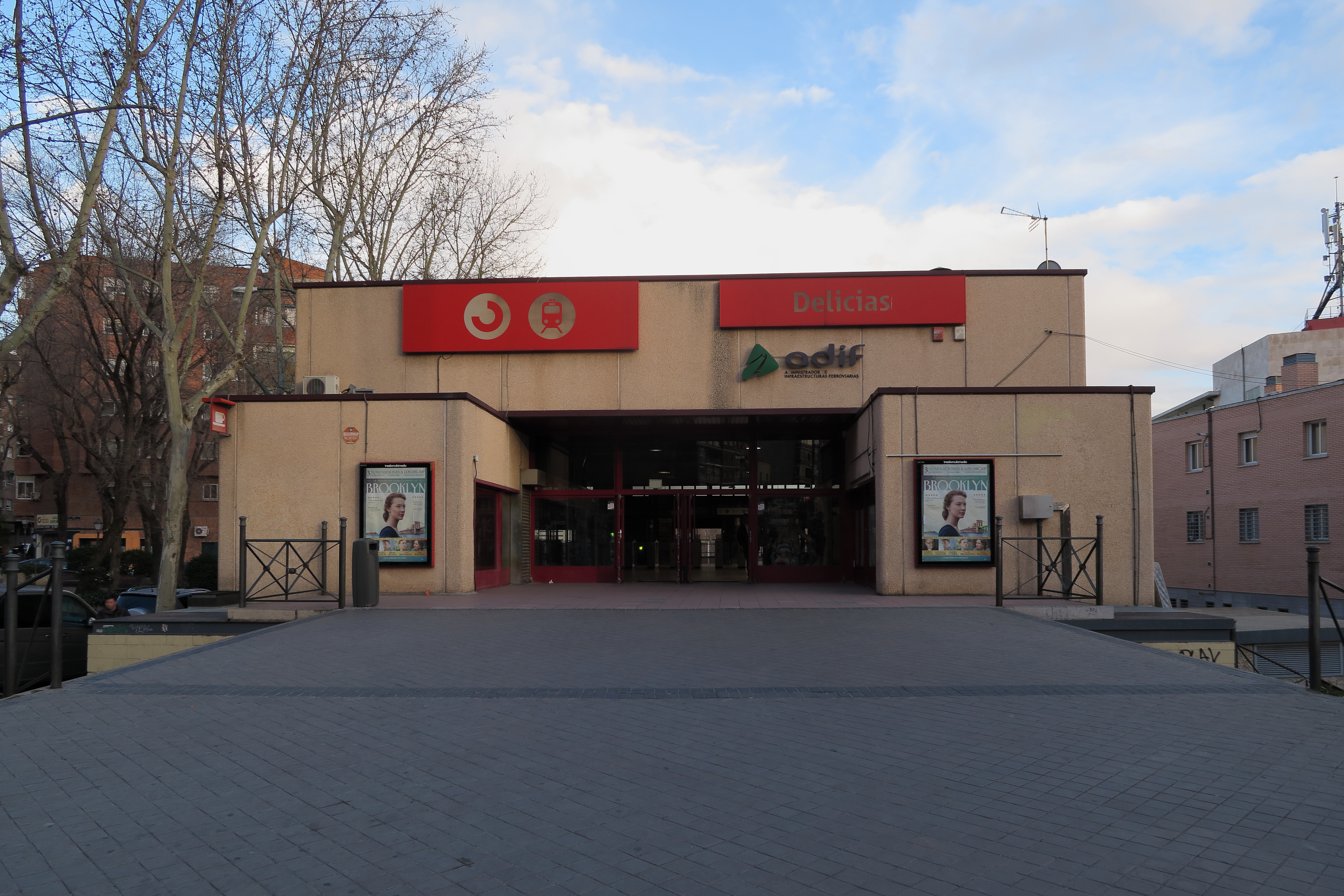

General information
- Location: Arganzuela, Madrid
- Coordinates: 40.4005°N 3.6930°W
- Owner: Adif
- Operator: Renfe
- Line: Cercanias (local services)

Other information
- Fare zone: A

Services
Preceding station	Cercanías Madrid	Following station
Pirámides towards Príncipe Pío	C-1	Méndez Álvaro towards Aeropuerto T4
Pirámides towards Villalba	C-10	Méndez Álvaro towards Chamartín
Location

Delicias is a railway station serving the area of Arganzuela in Madrid, Spain. It is owned by Adif and operated by Renfe. The station is served by Cercanías Madrid lines C-1, C-7 and C-10.
