= Yorkshire Engine Company =

Rolling stock manufacturer

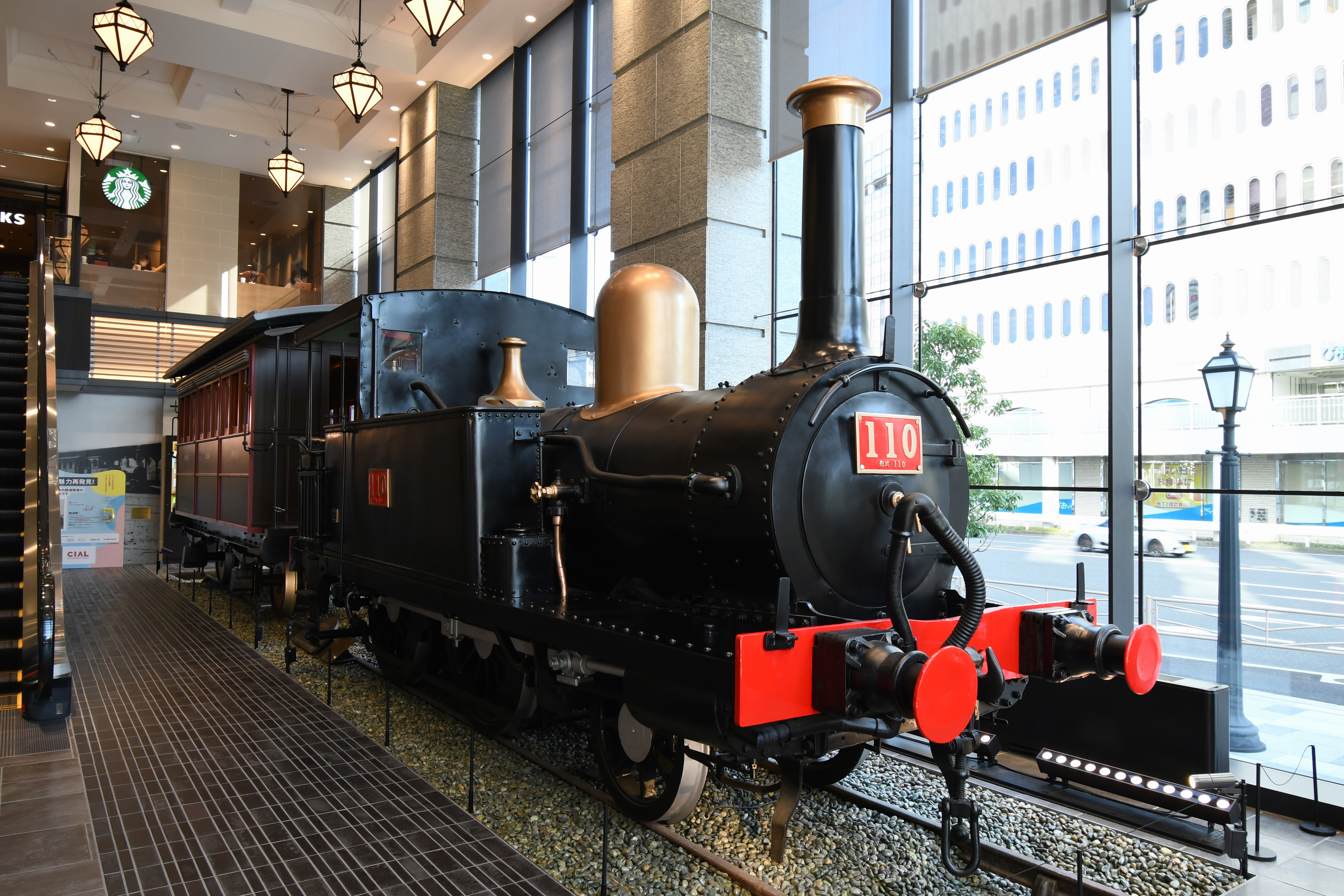
- JNR No. 10, the only YEC locomotive built for Japan in 1871, on display at Sakuragicho, Yokohama
- Type: Private
- Industry: Rail transport
- Founded: 1865
- Defunct: c. 1965
- Headquarters: Sheffield, England
- Key people: Archibald Sturrock (Chairman)
- Products: Locomotives

The Yorkshire Engine Company (YEC) was a small independent locomotive manufacturer in Sheffield. The company was formed in 1865 and produced locomotives and carried out general engineering work until 1965. It mainly built shunting engines for the British market, but also built main line engines for overseas customers.

Steam locomotives were built by the firm from 1865 to 1956 and diesel locomotives from 1950 to 1965. In 1945, the company was bought by the United Steel Companies (USC) to supply locomotives for its steelworks.

== The early years ==
The idea of a locomotive builder based near Sheffield was first suggested in 1864 by W. G. Eden, who later became the fourth Baron Auckland. At the time, Eden was Chairman of the South Yorkshire Railway, and a director of the Manchester, Sheffield and Lincolnshire Railway (MSLR), posts which he had taken up after retiring as a diplomat. He invited Archibald Sturrock, who was employed by the Great Northern Railway as its locomotive engineer, to be the Chairman of the new company. Alfred Sacré would be the Managing Director, and his older brother, Charles, then the Engineer and Locomotive Superintendent for the MSLR, was also part of the team.

By April 1865 investors had promised £120,000 towards the estimated cost of £200,000 for setting up the company. Although Sturrock joined the board in May 1866, he did not become chairman until January 1867. A 22 acres (8.9 ha) site near Blackburn Meadows was chosen for the works. Construction and the procurement of machinery began in mid-1865, and Meadowhall Works was virtually complete in May 1867, by which time all of the 2,000 shares had been taken up.

The first order received was for three 2-2-2 locomotives for the Great Northern Railway. The specification was changed and they were supplied with a 2-4-0 wheel arrangement. They were delivered two months late, the last in February 1867, and the company made a loss on them, largely because the works was not yet complete. An order for ten more followed, which were also delivered late. The first was two months late, but the final one was eight months overdue by the time it was delivered in March 1869.

Next came orders for fifty 0-6-0 locomotives for two Indian railways, but then demand tailed off. In order to keep the workforce together, other work was undertaken, including armour plated shields, lamp posts for the Chief Constable of Sheffield, and 10,000 safes. Orders from three Russian railways kept the works busy, but difficulties in obtaining payment resulted in cash-flow problems. The original directors all resigned in 1871. Locomotives were supplied to Argentina, Australia and Japan, and a number of small 0-4-0 saddle tanks were supplied to local collieries. The company continued to take on general engineering work to supplement the building of locomotives for most of its existence.

A modest profit was made in 1871, following serious losses in the previous two years. The building of locomotives to Robert Fairlie's patent started at the end of that year. Between 1872 and 1883, thirteen were supplied to the Mexican Railway in three batches. They were 0-6-6-0 double ended machines, and the middle batch had Walschaerts valve gear, believed to be the first time that this design was built in Britain. The Mexican locomotives were capable of burning coal or wood as a fuel, while two supplied to Sweden burnt peat. The peat burners were not a success and were rebuilt at four 2-4-0 saddle tanks.

An order for ten Fairlies received in 1873 for nitrate railways in Peru were built, but were not shipped because payment was not received. Four went to the Trancaucasian Railway near the Black Sea, and six were eventually shipped to a new Nitrate Railway Company in 1882. They had a 2-6-6-2 wheel arrangement, and at 85 tons each, Engineering reported that they were the heaviest locomotives in the world in 1885.

An attempt to build marine engines and traction engines to patents by Loftus Perkins was less successful. When purchasers pulled out, Perkins sued the company, which lost £34,532 on the venture. A joint venture with Perkins for the construction of tramway engines was also a failure. When there was insufficient work, the company built 0-4-0 saddle tanks for stock, which enabled collieries and engineering works to buy locomotives off the shelf. This practice continued throughout the life of the company.

By 1880, the company was in serious financial difficulties. The Russian debts were never paid, and a dubious method was used to write off the loss made on the marine engines. Despite a successful call to shareholders for more money, the company chose voluntary liquidation as the best option in July 1880. Liquidators ran the business for three and a half years, during which time turnover increased and profits of £9,419 were made. In September 1883, the second Yorkshire Engine Company was launched, by issuing 2,400 shares valued at £25, giving a capital of £60,000. Few locomotive manufacturers were profitable at the time.

Early YEC locomotives produced for the UK market consisted mainly of 0-4-0ST and 0-6-0ST types. The style of these was typical of small locomotives of the time with the so-call ‘ogee’ tanks and very little protection for the driver. That did not stop early locomotives surviving with industrial users until the 1950s. The collieries and steelworks of Yorkshire were regular customers, with five narrow gauge locomotives going to the Chattenden and Upnor Railway, a military railway in Kent.

The 1890s saw YEC building locomotives for Chile, Peru and India. They also built a single electric locomotive for the British War Office.

== Mainline engines ==
YEC undertook orders for mainline locomotive for the UK and overseas countries.

Locomotives were built for the Great Northern Railway, Lancashire and Yorkshire Railway and the Great Eastern Railway.

In 1871, a 2-4-0 locomotive was ordered by Japan's first railway, making the only order for Japan. This locomotive is still in existence, and now displayed at Sakuragicho railway station in Yokohama.

In 1872, three Fairlie 0-6-6-0 Articulated Locomotives were supplied to the Mexican Railways for the Orizaba, Veracruz to Esperanza, Puebla Route.

In 1874, an order for 13 F class locomotives was dispatched to New Zealand. Two of these engines survived into preservation.

- F12 at Ferrymead Railway, in a derelict state,
- F180 "Meg Merriles" at Auckland's Museum of Transport & Technology, Was in a static restored condition after retirement in 1966, but was restored to operating condition over many years and returned to service in 2018. Fifty years after being built, the builder's photo of F180 was included in an advertisement for the Yorkshire Engine Company, in a 1924 edition of The Railway Magazine.

In 1901 four locomotives were built for use on the Metropolitan Railway main line to Aylesbury. These were F Class 0-6-2Ts and survived for around 60 years, the first being scrapped on 1957 and the last in 1964. More orders from the Metropolitan Railway followed in 1915 and 1916 for larger G Class 0-6-4Ts. Unlike the F Class, the G Class locomotives passed to the LNER on 1 November 1937, when that company became responsible for providing motive power for trains north of Rickmansworth, and the locomotives only lasted in service for 30 years.

1928 saw the LNER get locomotives delivered directly from Sheffield. These nine locomotives (LNER 2682 to 2690) were Class N2 0-6-2Ts for working suburban trains.

Along with a number of other private builders, YEC built a batch of GWR 5700 Class 0-6-0PTs in 1929/1930.

Between 1949 and 1956, 50 GWR 9400 Class 0-6-0PTs were built for British Railways (BR). The last of these, BR No. 3409 (YE2584 of 1956), was the last steam locomotive built at Meadowhall and the last BR locomotive to be built to a pre-nationalisation design. The order for these locomotives had been given to the Hunslet Engine Company in Leeds but as it was already busy, the work was sub-contracted to Sheffield.

Far bigger than anything built for use in Britain were the export locomotives. 2-8-2 and 4-8-2 tender locomotives for South America.

== Car production ==
During 1907 Yorkshire Engine Co. started to build motor cars, branded as 'YEC'. These were not a success and very few were produced.

== Miniature locomotives ==
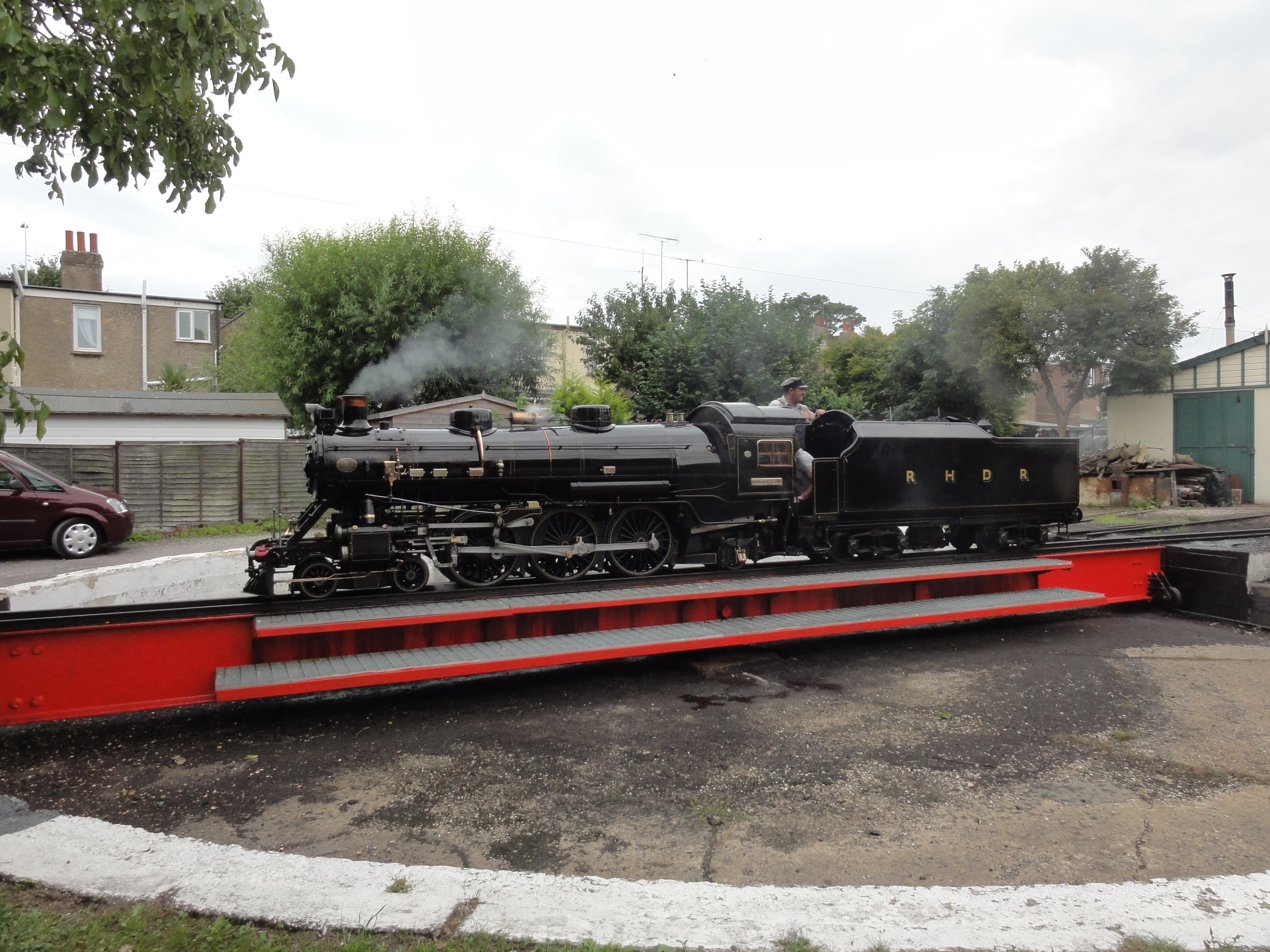
RH&DR Engine No. 10 'Dr Syn'

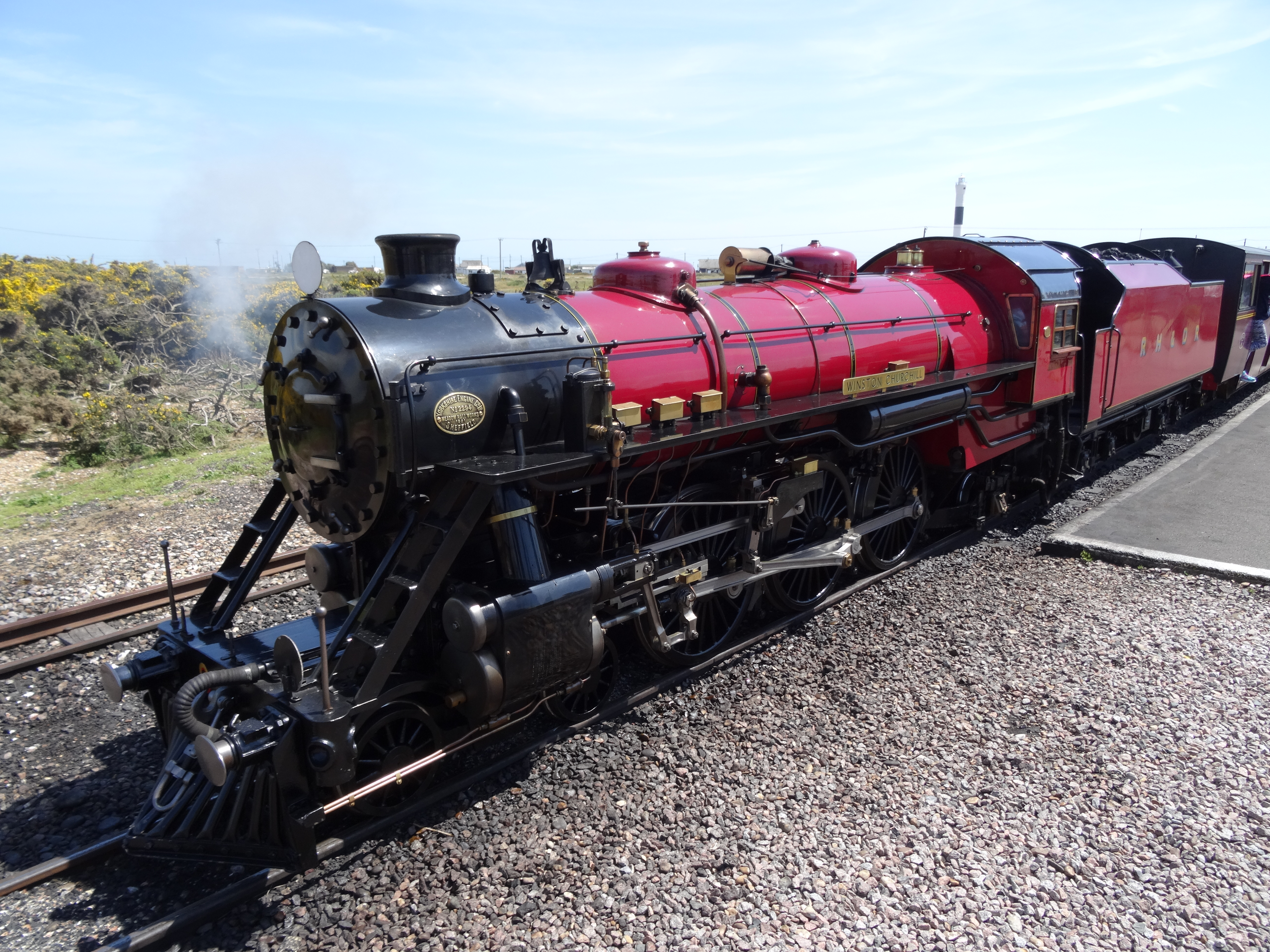
Romney, Hythe and Dymchurch Railway No. 9 'Winston Churchill'

The Romney, Hythe and Dymchurch Railway "Mainline in Miniature" built by Captain Howey was, and still is, well known for its fleet of engines built by Davy Paxman and based on the locomotives of Nigel Gresley. A flaw with these designs was shown up when the railway started running to Dungeness through the winter – a lack of protection for the driver.

Captain Howey and Henry Greenly started work on a pair of 4-6-2 locomotives based on Canadian Pacific Railway designs, with larger, better protected, cabs. While Howey was in Australia, Greenly quarrelled with the management and engineers of the railway, before destroying the working drawings and departing. The parts, including boilers, wheels and cylinders were shipped to the Yorkshire Engine Co. and the locomotives were completed in Sheffield in 1931. It is assumed that all the detailed design works was done by the company based on a few sketches drawn by Captain Howey. YE 2294 and 2295 are better known as No. 9 Winston Churchill and No.10 Doctor Syn; they are still running (other than when being overhauled) and are the best known of any Yorkshire Engine Co. locomotives.

== United Steel Companies and diesel locomotive development ==
The business was bought by the United Steel Companies (USC) on 29 June 1945. USC needed replacement locomotives so it made sense to buy a manufacturer (at the right price) and the idea had been put forward of developing a central engineering workshop for their steelworks at Templeborough (Rotherham) and Stocksbridge. Both works were being expanded and redeveloped, and were easily accessible by rail from the YEC works. In the post war climate, the YEC management were willing to sell.

Following the purchase, work began on building steam locomotives for the internal rail systems at several steelworks as well as ironstone mines around Britain. YEC continued to build locomotives for other customers, just as they had before the takeover.

The design for a modern 0-6-0ST locomotive was bought from Robert Stephenson & Hawthorns and locomotives of this type were built for steel works, primarily as replacements for locomotives worn out during the Second World War. This design was undoubtedly chosen because a number were already in use at Appleby-Frodingham works, Scunthorpe and given various type names (these include "Type 1", "16inch" and "Group 17"). A small number of locomotives were built for ironstone mines to a War Department ‘Austerity’ design. It is believed that the use of this design was connected with the sub-contract of other locomotive construction from Hunslet Engine Company.

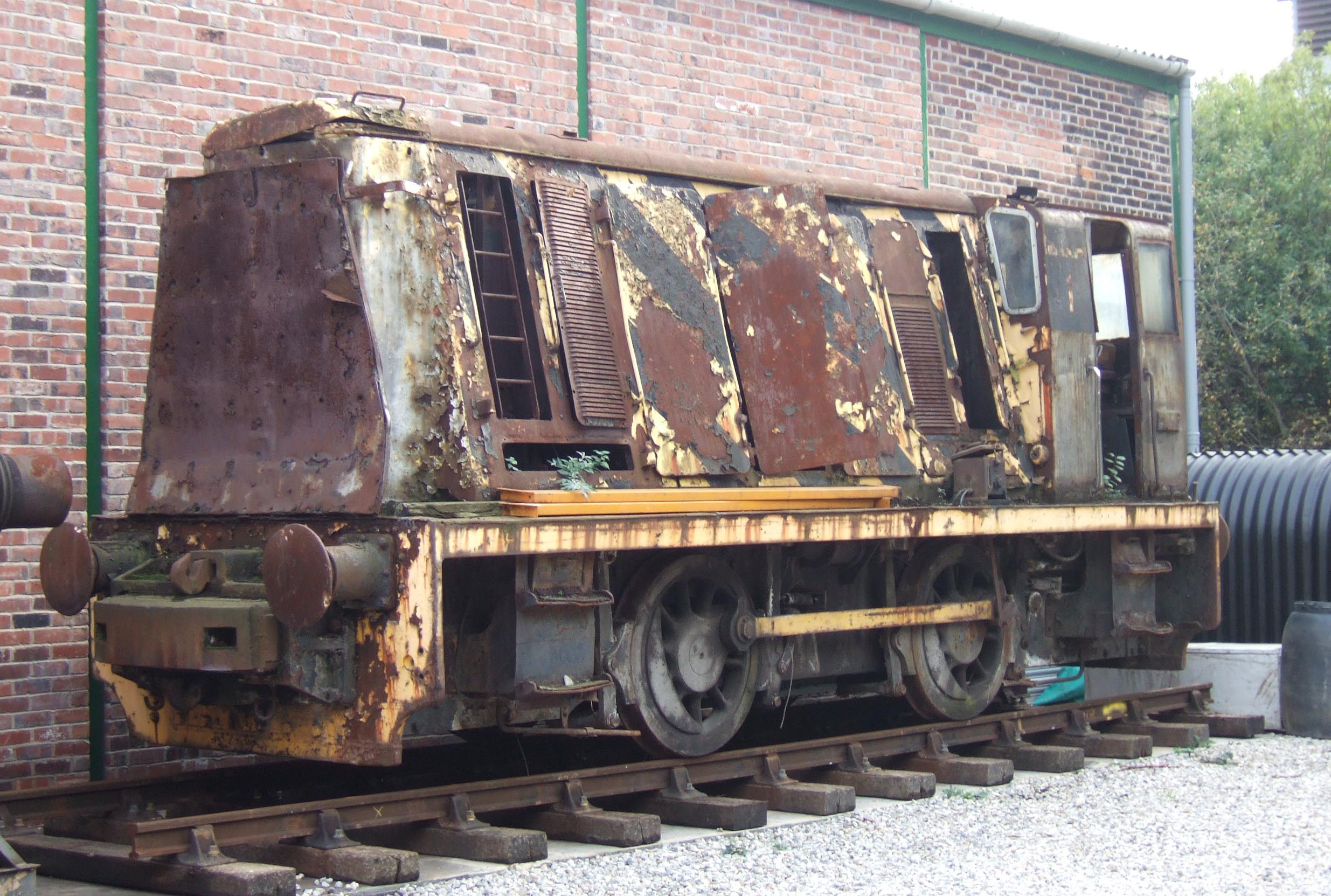
YE 2481 at Kelham Island Museum in 2005

In 1950 a diesel-electric locomotive was built for use in the melting shop of Templeborough steelworks. The duty had special requirements for a locomotive to fit through a small opening and around tight curves while being powerful enough to haul heavy ‘Casting Cars’. The weight of the locomotive had to be high to give better grip. The design featured a Paxman engine and British Thompson-Houston electric equipment powering and 0-4-0 chassis. The first locomotive (Works number 2480) left the works at the end of 1950 with a second (No. 2481) leaving in early 1951. No.2480 was displayed and demonstrated before final delivery while No.2481 was delivered direct from the works (a journey of about 1 mile). Both locomotives survived to be preserved in the late 1980s.

No other locomotives were built to this design.

== Production diesel-electric locomotives ==
It was 2 years before another diesel locomotive was built but during this time the diesel-electric design was refined and YEC were soon marketing four designs all based on engines and electrical equipment similar to the first diesel locomotives.

- DE1 – 0-4-0, 240 hp, 37 tons, 25 mph
- DE2 – 0-4-0, 275 hp, 45 tons, 22 mph
- DE3 – 0-4-0, 400 hp, 50 tons, 25 mph
- DE4 – 0-6-0, 400 hp, 51 tons, 27 mph

(not every locomotive was built to these exact details)

The DE2 design was popular with steelworks and continued to be built until 1965. Small numbers of the DE1 and DE4 were built but were superseded in 1955 and 1956 by new designs with Rolls-Royce engines. No locomotives were built to the DE3 design, probably because they were too big and heavy for use on normal railway work.

== Rolls-Royce engines ==
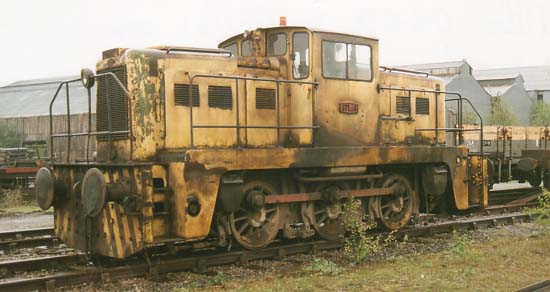
Typical Janus locomotive at a steelworks

When Rolls-Royce Diesels introduced their C range engine, it was adopted by locomotive builders for use in Diesel-hydraulic locomotives. These benefited from having a faster running engine (1800 rpm). Likewise, YEC used the C series engines in a new range of locomotives, the first of which was introduced in 1955 and which continued to evolve until 1965, the higher engine speed being an advantage for diesel-electric locomotives as well.

Generally the diesel locomotives built with Rolls-Royce engines shared many design features – rounded engine covers (bonnets) narrow enough to permit walkways to be put down each side; four cab windows overlooking the engine; fuel tanks and/or battery boxes built into the running boards; walkways or balconies at each end; access to the cab from a walkway or balcony.

None of the Rolls-Royce engined locomotives were given class/type numbers but several were given names. The first to be given a name was the ‘Janus’. This design was symmetrical with two engines (C6SFL rated at 200 hp each) and a central cab. The name was appropriate as Janus was a Roman god with two faces. ‘Taurus’, ‘Indus’ and ‘Olympus’ designs were produced which had many similarities in style.

== Diesel-hydraulics and locomotives for British Railways ==
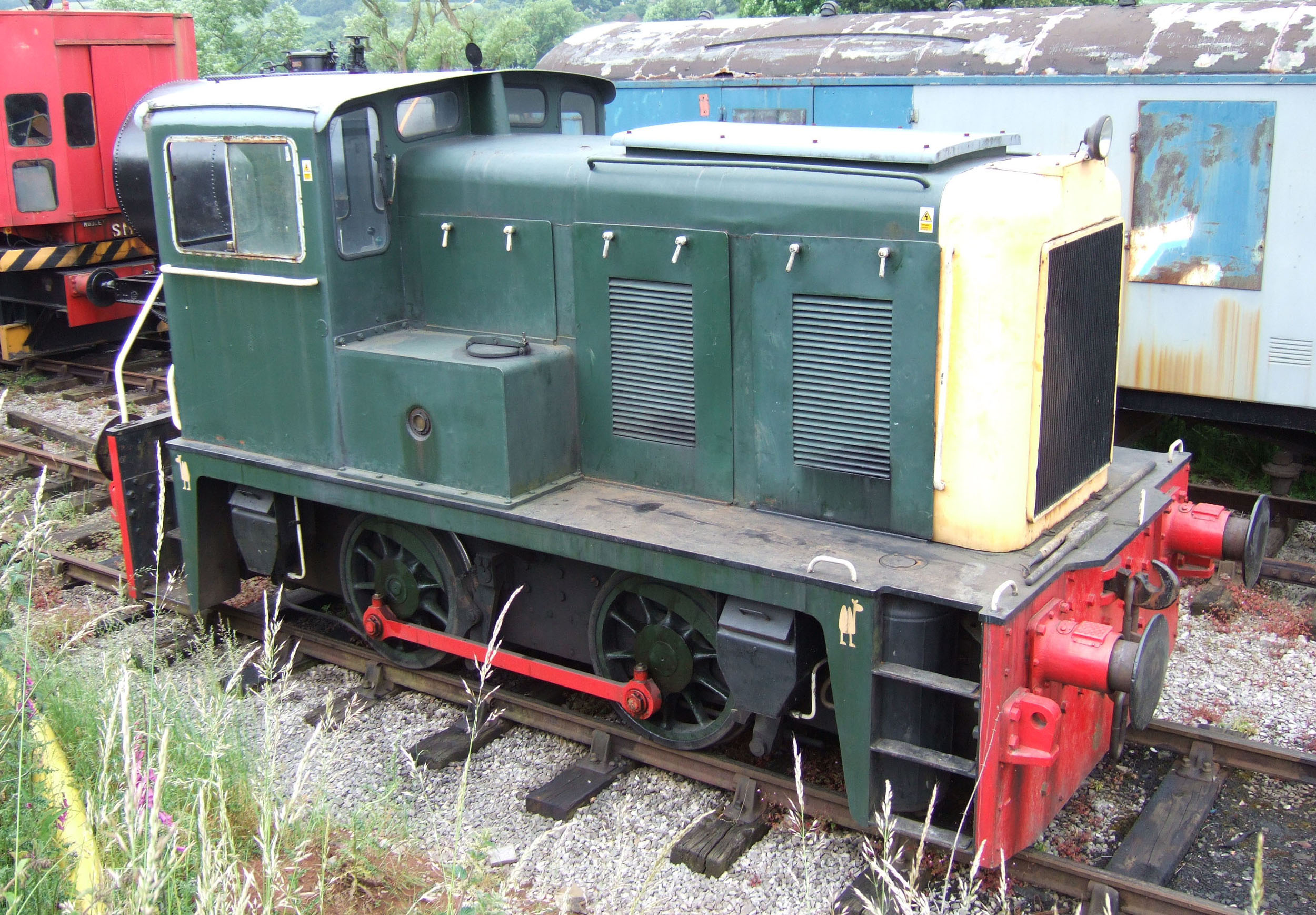
One of the first YEC Diesel Hydraulic locomotives built for industrial use

Around 1960, the first diesel-hydraulic were produced. Other builders had shown that a type of hydraulic transmission, called a ‘multi-stage torque converter’, was cheap to buy, needed very little maintenance and was very easy to use. YEC immediately found customers for these locomotives and increased the number of designs available.

In 1960 and 1961 batches of 180 hp locomotives, totalling 20, were built for British Railways. These were very closely related to the standard small diesel-hydraulic locomotives but with a few modifications to suit their use on a main line railway (different arrangement of fuel tanks, vacuum train brake system and marker lights). These locomotives were later designated Class 02.

At least three YEC locomotives were demonstrated or given trials on British Railways between 1956 and 1963, these were a Janus, a Taurus and a 300 hp diesel-hydraulic.

Yorkshire Engine Co built the chassis and bodies of the 10 prototype Class 15 locomotives under contract from British Thomson Houston Co Ltd (BTH).

== Exports to India ==
Yorkshire Engine Co had been exporting steam locomotives to India for most of their existence, but in 1958 ten broad gauge (5 ft 6 in (1,676 mm) ) 230-hp 0-4-0 diesel-electric shunting locomotives were supplied for the construction of Durgapur Steel Works in Eastern India. This was followed in 1963–64 with five 300-hp 0-4-0 diesel-electric locomotives and ten 600-hp ‘Olympus’ Bo-Bo locomotives. The Durgapur works was developed in conjunction with United Steel Companies, so it is not surprising that YEC locomotives were used there.

In addition, YEC secured an order for two metre-gauge ‘Janus’ locomotives for the Indian Fertilizer Corporation.

== Closure ==
Locomotive construction ended in 1965. It is not recorded exactly why the works was closed but three facts seem to have all had an influence on the decision. Firstly the market for new locomotives was shrinking rapidly with a number of other manufacturers closing around this time. Secondly, most of the USC works were fully equipped with YEC locomotives. Thirdly, nationalisation of the British steel industry was to take place in 1967 and it is unlikely that the locomotive business was wanted as part of the new corporation.

Several locomotives under construction at the time of closure left the works before they had been completed. These locomotives were destined for USC steelworks which had the capability to complete the construction work in their own engineering works.

The rights to the YEC designs and the good will of the business were sold to Rolls-Royce Sentinel Division at Shrewsbury who had previously supplied a high proportion of diesel engines used by YEC and were a competitor in the industrial locomotive market. In 1967 three locomotives were bought from Shrewsbury for use at Scunthorpe Steelworks, these were built to the Janus design to match the many similar locomotives there built in Sheffield. A fourth locomotive, to a different YEC design, was supplied to AEI in Manchester.

When Rolls-Royce hit financial problems in 1971 they stopped all locomotive work and the YEC designs, along with those for Rolls-Royce locomotives passed to Thomas Hill at Kilnhurst, near Rotherham who had been agents for Rolls-Royce for some time. (Thomas Hill built three locos to Yorkshire design, for the Durgapur Steel Works in Eastern India).

The former Yorkshire Engine Company works at Meadowhall, Sheffield, was transferred to McCall and Company another part of the United Steel Companies group. Reinforcing bars (for concrete) were produced here. The works passed to Rom River Reinforements in the mid-1990s but was closed early in the 21st century when the roof of the main building was deemed to be beyond repair. Subsequently the works has been completely refurbished and is now (2009) occupied by the engineering firm of Chesterfield Special Cylinders.

Locomotives returned to the site on a regular basis between 1988 and 2001 when the South Yorkshire Railway Preservation Society used the few remaining railway lines in the Meadowhall works to load and unload preserved locomotives that were moved by lorry (the lines between the buildings were set into the roadway). A number of these locomotives were products of the Yorkshire Engine Company, including YE2480, the first diesel locomotive they built.

== Major customers for diesel locomotives ==
- British Railways
- Imperial Chemical Industries (ICI)
- National Coal Board
- Pilkington Glass
- Port of London Authority
- United Steel Company (locomotives still in use)

== Re-use of the Yorkshire Engine Co name ==
In 1988 the name "Yorkshire Engine Company" was re-registered by a new business. This new company was again in the industrial locomotive business but with efforts concentrated on hiring locomotives to industrial users and also undertaking rebuilds and re-engining work on existing locomotive.

The new YEC went into receivership in 2001 and ceased trading. The yard was based on the army camp at Long Marston, which by 2007 was being used for storage of locomotives and rolling stock, both for preservation groups and commercial organisations.
