= Ávila railway station =

Ávila
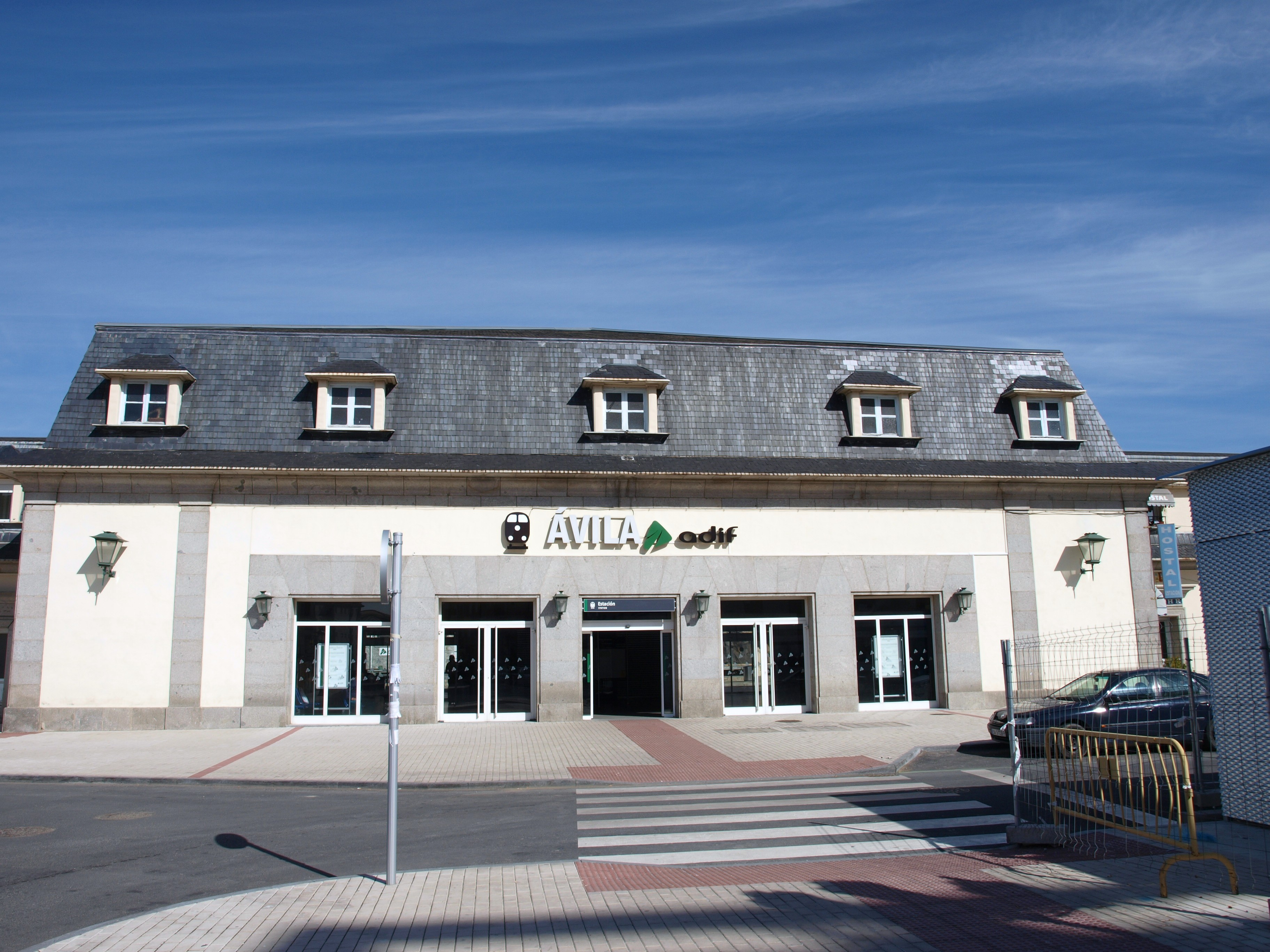

General information
- Coordinates: 40°39′25″N 4°40′58″W
- Owner: adif
- Operator: Renfe

Passengers
- 2018: 600,590
Location

Ávila railway station (IATA: AVS) is the central railway station of Ávila, Spain. Commonly referred locally as the Renfe station, the station is part of Adif and high-speed rail systems.

== Railway service ==
The station accommodates RENFE long-distance and medium-distance trains (AVE). A 55 km (34 mi) high-speed spur leaves the Madrid–Valladolid route at Segovia and continues to Ávila.

Preceding station	Renfe Operadora	Following station
Madrid-Chamartín Terminus	Trenhotel "Atlántico"	Medina del Campo towards Ferrol
Madrid-Chamartín Terminus	Trenhotel "Lusitania"	Medina del Campo towards Santa Apolónia
Madrid-Chamartín Terminus	Trenhotel "Rías Gallegas"	Medina del Campo towards A Coruña or Pontevedra
Herradón-La Cañada towards Madrid-Chamartín	Intercity	Arévalo towards León
Herradón-La Cañada towards Madrid-Chamartín	Intercity	Arévalo towards Vitoria-Gasteiz
Herradón-La Cañada towards Madrid-Chamartín	Intercity	Arévalo towards Irun
Villalba towards Madrid Chamartín	Media Distancia 13	Cardeñosa de Ávila towards Salamanca
Villalba towards Madrid Chamartín	Media Distancia 16	Arévalo towards Valladolid-Campo Grande
Guimorcondo towards Madrid Atocha	Media Distancia 51	Terminus
