= Palencia railway station =

Railway station in Palencia, Spain

Palencia
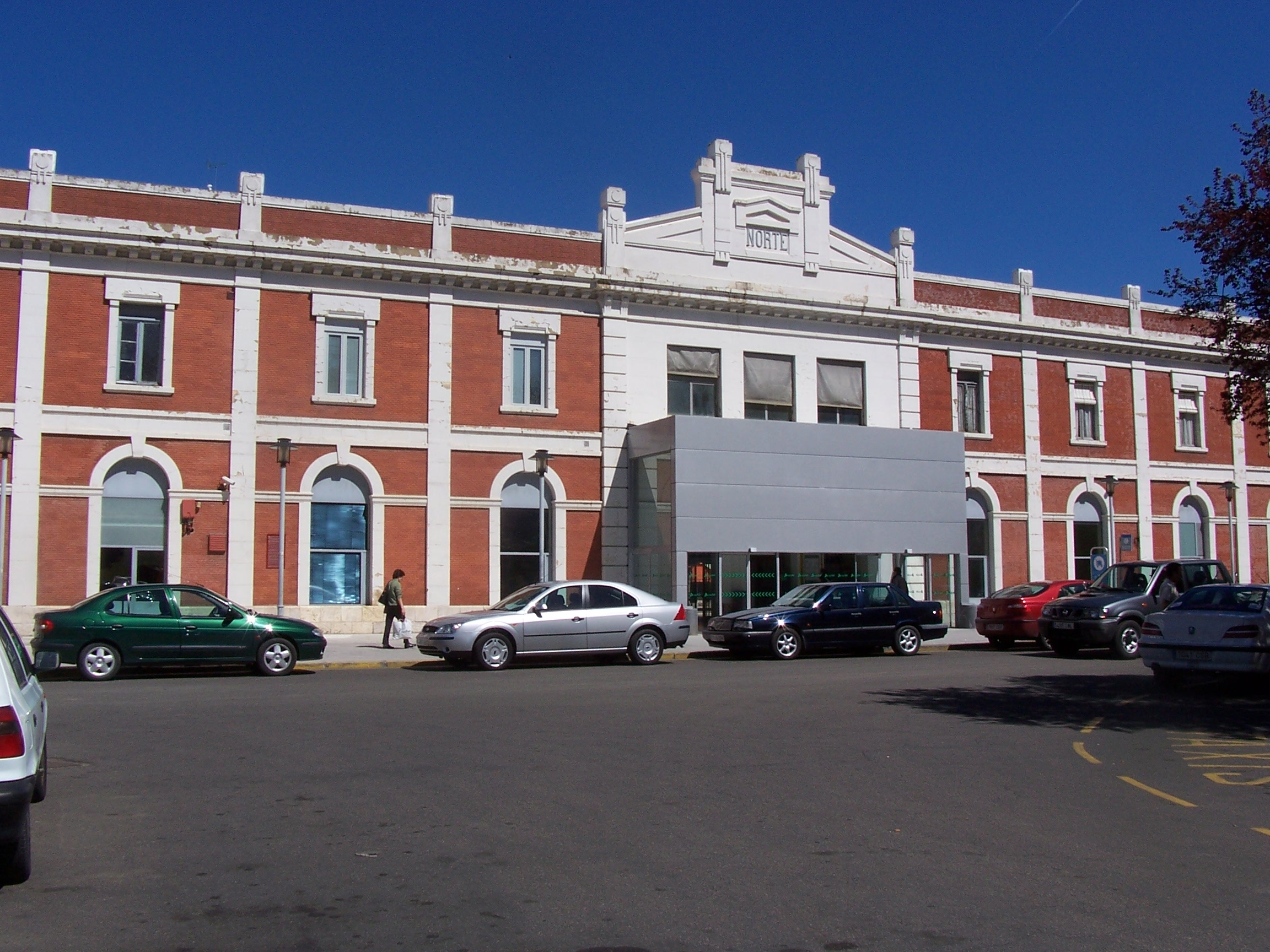
- Station building

General information
- Owner: Adif
- Operator: Renfe
- Lines: Venta de Baños–Gijón railway; Madrid–León high-speed rail line
- Platforms: 5

Other information
- Station code: 14100

Passengers
- 2018: 594,361
Location

Palencia railway station serves the Spanish city of Palencia, Castile and León. It is located on the Madrid–León high-speed rail line, and serves over 500,000 passengers a year.

== Services ==
AVE high-speed rail services operate between Madrid-Chamartín and León calling at Palencia; Alvia trains to A Coruña, Gijón and Santander; and local regional services.

Preceding station	Renfe Operadora	Following station
Valladolid-Campo Grande towards Madrid Chamartín	AVE	León Terminus
Valladolid-Campo Grande towards Madrid Chamartín	Alvia	León towards Gijón
Valladolid-Campo Grande towards Madrid Chamartín	Alvia	Aguilar de Campoo towards Santander
Valladolid-Campo Grande towards Madrid Chamartín	Alvia	León towards Ponferrada
Valladolid-Campo Grande towards Alicante	Alvia	León towards Gijón
Valladolid-Campo Grande towards Alicante	Alvia	Aguilar de Campoo towards Santander
Valladolid-Campo Grande towards Oropesa del Mar	Alvia	León towards Gijón
Burgos-Rosa de Lima towards Barcelona Sants	Alvia	Sahagún towards Gijón
Burgos-Rosa de Lima towards Barcelona Sants	Alvia	Sahagún towards A Coruña
Burgos-Rosa de Lima towards Barcelona Sants	Alvia	Sahagún towards Vigo-Guixar
Venta de Baños towards Madrid Chamartín	Trenhotel Atlántico	León towards A Coruña or Ferrol
Venta de Baños towards Madrid Chamartín	Trenhotel Rías Gallegas	León towards Pontevedra
Burgos-Rosa de Lima towards Barcelona Sants	Trenhotel Galicia	León towards A Coruña or Vigo-Guixar
Burgos-Rosa de Lima towards Hendaye	Intercity	Villada towards A Coruña
Burgos-Rosa de Lima towards Bilbao-Abando	Intercity	Villada towards Vigo-Guixar
Valladolid-Campo Grande towards Madrid Chamartín	Intercity	León towards Santander
Valladolid-Campo Grande towards Madrid Chamartín	Intercity	León towards Vigo-Guixar
Venta de Baños towards Madrid Chamartín	Intercity	Paredes de Nava towards León
Venta de Baños towards Madrid Chamartín	Intercity	Burgos-Rosa de Lima towards Vitoria-Gasteiz
Venta de Baños towards Madrid Chamartín	Intercity	Burgos-Rosa de Lima towards Irun
Venta de Baños towards Valladolid-Campo Grande	Media Distancia 14	Terminus
Venta de Baños towards Valladolid-Campo Grande	Media Distancia 17	Grijota towards León
Venta de Baños towards Salamanca	Media Distancia 19	Terminus
Venta de Baños towards Valladolid-Campo Grande	Media Distancia 20	Monzón de Campos towards Santander
Venta de Baños towards Valladolid-Campo Grande	Media Distancia 21	Magaz towards Vitoria-Gasteiz
