= Segovia-Guiomar railway station =

Railway station in Segovia, Spain

Segovia-Guiomar
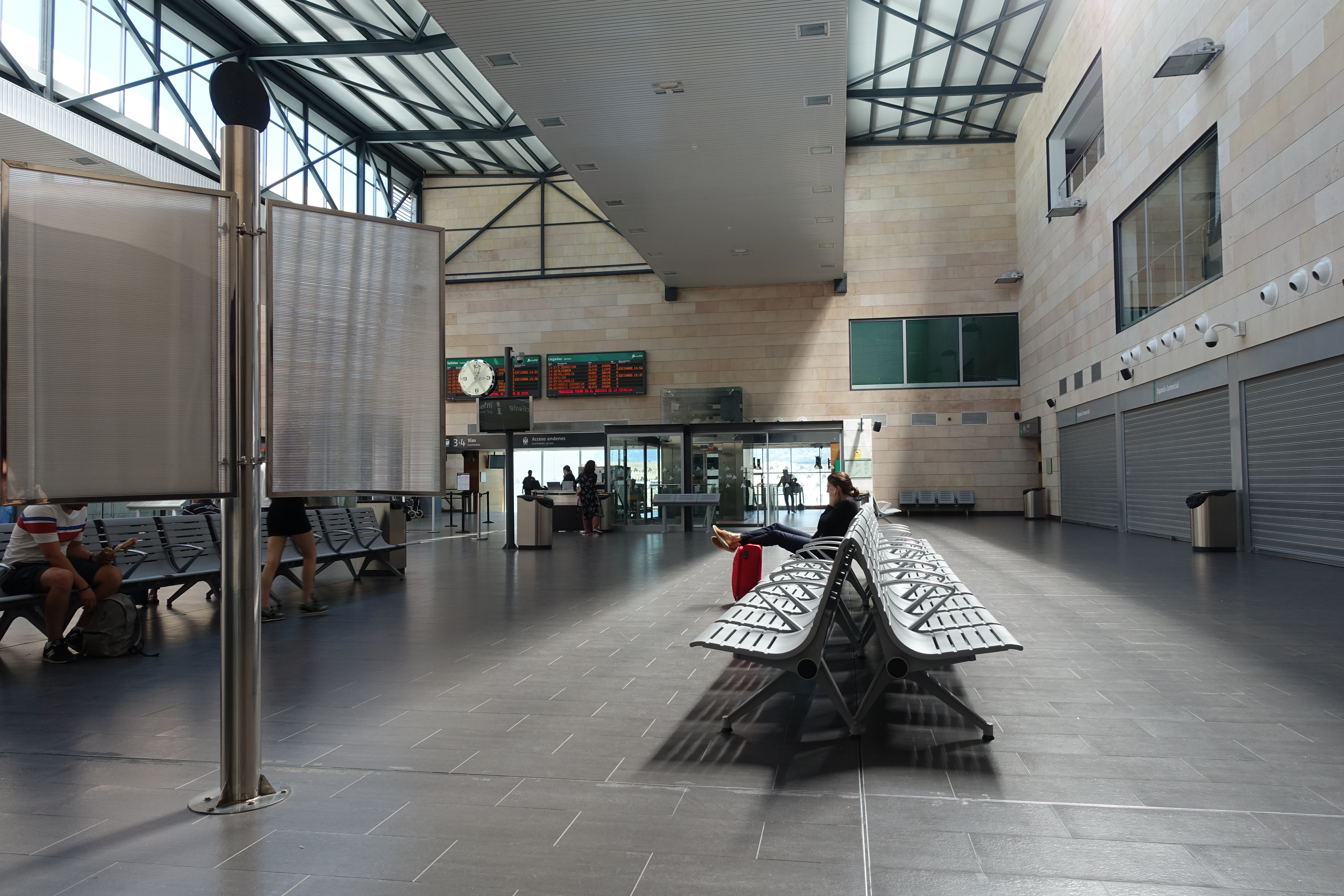
- Waiting Hall of Segovia-Guiomar.

General information
- Location: Acceso Estación Alta Velocidad, 40195 Segovia; Spain
- Coordinates: 40°54′36.5″N 4°5′41.5″W
- Owner: Adif
- Operator: Renfe, Ouigo España
- Line: Madrid–León high-speed rail line

Other information
- Website: Station page on adif.es

History
- Opened: 22 December 2007

Passengers
- 2018: 1,125,573
Location

Segovia-Guiomar is a railway station serving the city of Segovia, Spain. It is situated 7 km (4.3 mi) from the centre of Segovia, near the Hontoria Industrial Park. The station is located on the Madrid–Asturias high-speed rail line between Madrid-Chamartín and Valladolid. It is served by through high-speed passenger services operated by Renfe and Ouigo to multiple destinations in Spain, including Santiago de Compostela, San Sebastián, Salamanca and Alicante. It is also served by regional high speed services under the Avant brand.

It was opened in December 2007, together with the high speed line between Madrid and Valladolid. The old train station, located closer to the city centre on the Villalba-Segovia branch line, is still served by a few daily regional trains but has lost significance since the opening of Segovia-Guiomar.

Preceding station	Renfe Operadora	Following station
Madrid Chamartín Terminus	AVE	Valladolid-Campo Grande towards León
Madrid Chamartín Terminus	Alvia	Valladolid-Campo Grande towards Bilbao-Abando
Madrid Chamartín Terminus	Alvia	Valladolid-Campo Grande towards Gijón
Madrid Chamartín Terminus	Alvia	Valladolid-Campo Grande towards Hendaye
Madrid Chamartín Terminus	Alvia	Valladolid-Campo Grande towards Santander
Madrid Chamartín Terminus	Alvia	Salamanca Terminus
Madrid Chamartín Terminus	Alvia	Medina del Campo AV towards Ferrol
Madrid Chamartín Terminus	Alvia	Medina del Campo AV towards Lugo
Madrid Chamartín Terminus	Alvia	Medina del Campo AV towards Pontevedra
Madrid Chamartín Terminus	Alvia	Medina del Campo AV towards Vigo-Urzáiz
Madrid Chamartín towards Alicante	Alvia	Valladolid-Campo Grande towards Gijón
Madrid Chamartín towards Alicante	Alvia	Valladolid-Campo Grande towards Santander
Madrid Chamartín Terminus	Avant 86	Valladolid-Campo Grande Terminus
