= Burgos-Rosa Manzano railway station =

Railway station in Spain

Burgos-Rosa Manzano
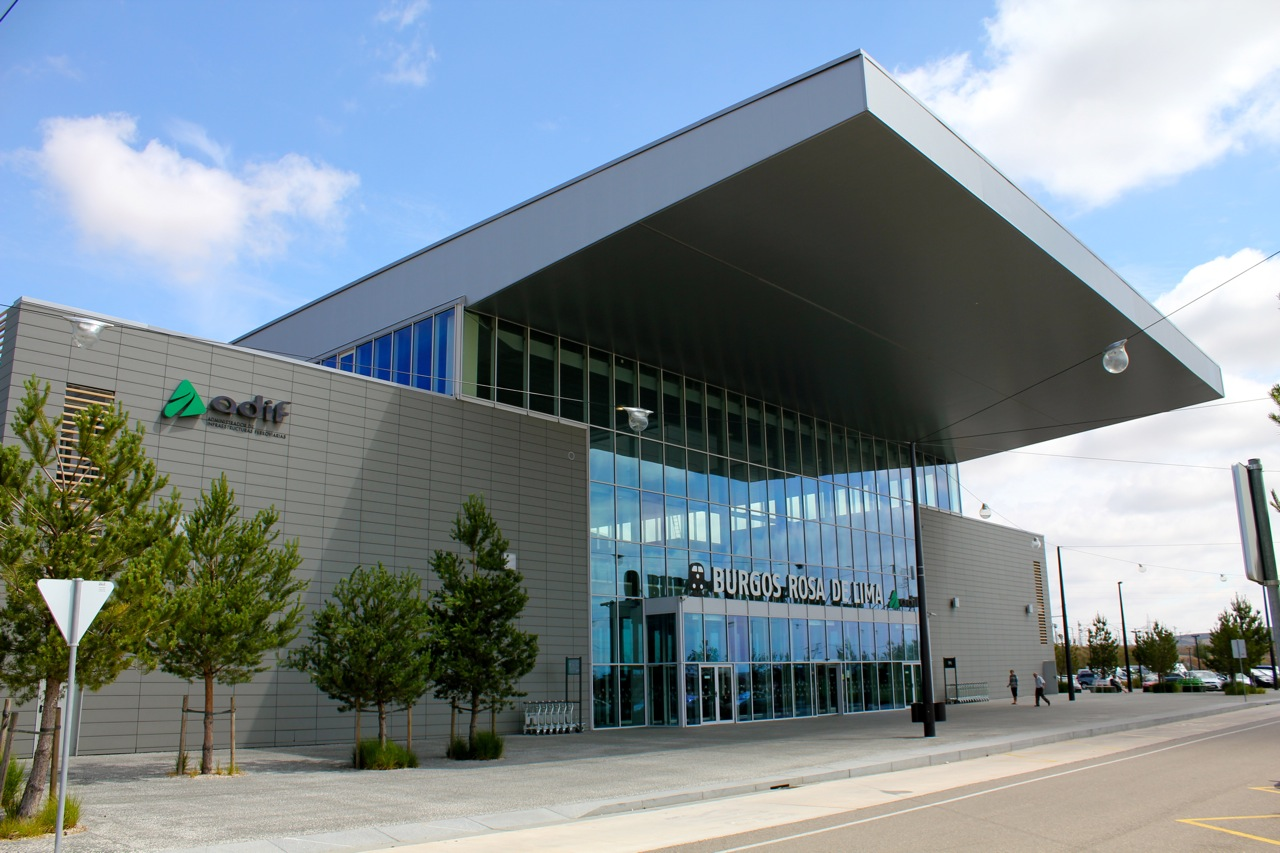
- Station building

General information
- Coordinates: 42.3708°N 3.6662°W
- Owner: Adif
- Operator: Renfe
- Line: Madrid–Hendaye railway

History
- Opened: 2008

Passengers
- 2018: 306,164
Location

Burgos-Rosa Manzano railway station, previously known as Burgos Rosa de Lima railway station, serves the Spanish city of Burgos, Castile and León. The station opened in 2008, named after the politician Rosa de Lima Manzano Gete responsible for the Directorate-General for Traffic and killed in service in 1988 in a helicopter accident. This railway station serves around 300,000 passengers a year.

== Services ==
Burgos-Rosa Manzano is served by Alvia trains to Madrid-Chamartín and Barcelona Sants; and regional trains from A Coruña to Hendaye, Gijón, Bilbao-Abando and Vitoria-Gasteiz.

Preceding station	Renfe Operadora	Following station
Valladolid-Campo Grande towards Madrid Chamartín	Alvia	Miranda de Ebro towards Bilbao-Abando
Valladolid-Campo Grande towards Madrid Chamartín	Alvia	Miranda de Ebro towards Hendaye
Valladolid-Campo Grande towards Madrid Chamartín	Alvia	Miranda de Ebro towards Vitoria-Gasteiz
Palencia towards A Coruña	Alvia	Miranda de Ebro towards Barcelona Sants
Palencia towards Gijón	Alvia	Miranda de Ebro towards Barcelona Sants
Palencia towards Vigo-Guixar	Alvia	Miranda de Ebro towards Barcelona Sants
Valladolid-Campo Grande towards Salamanca	Intercity	Miranda de Ebro towards Barcelona Sants
Palencia towards A Coruña	Intercity	Briviesca towards Hendaye
Palencia towards Vigo-Guixar	Intercity	Briviesca towards Bilbao-Abando
Palencia towards Madrid Chamartín	Intercity	Briviesca towards Vitoria-Gasteiz
Palencia towards Madrid Chamartín	Intercity	Briviesca towards Irun
Villaquirán towards Valladolid-Campo Grande	Media Distancia 21	Briviesca towards Vitoria-Gasteiz
