= León railway station =

Train stop in northwest Spain

León
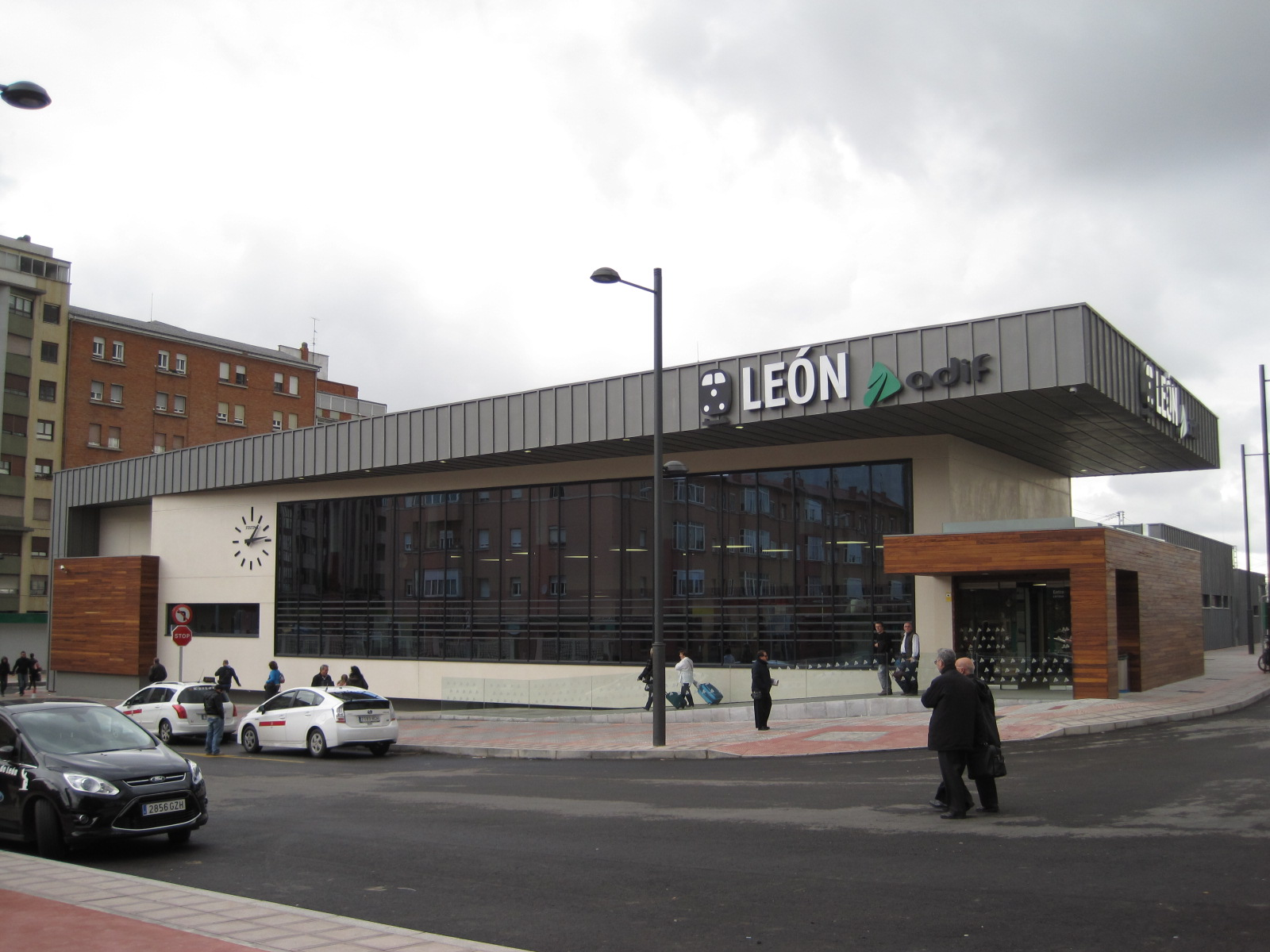

General information
- Owner: Adif
- Operator: Renfe
- Lines: Madrid–León high-speed rail line Venta de Baños–Gijón railway León–A Coruña railway

Construction
- Accessible: yes

Other information
- Station code: 15100

Passengers
- 2018: 961,733 ( )
Location

León railway station is the railway station of the Spanish city of León.

== History ==
The station was opened in 2011 in place of the old Estación del Norte.

== Services ==
León station is an important junction in the Spanish rail network, currently the terminus of the Madrid–León high-speed rail line, with services to Madrid Chamartín via Palencia and Valladolid. Alvia services are operated to A Coruña, Barcelona Sants, Gijón and Vitoria-Gasteiz. The Regional Express service goes to Santiago de Compostela and Vigo-Guixar.

Preceding station	Renfe Operadora	Following station
Palencia towards Madrid Chamartín	AVE	Terminus
Palencia towards Madrid Chamartín	Alvia	Veguellina towards Ponferrada
Palencia towards Oropesa del Mar	Alvia	Pola de Lena towards Gijón
Palencia towards Madrid Chamartín	Alvia	Pola de Lena towards Gijón
Palencia towards Alicante	Alvia	Pola de Lena towards Gijón
Sahagún towards Barcelona Sants	Alvia	La Robla towards Gijón
Sahagún towards Barcelona Sants	Alvia	Astorga towards A Coruña
Sahagún towards Barcelona Sants	Alvia	Astorga towards Vigo-Guixar
Sahagún towards Hendaye	Intercity	Astorga towards A Coruña
Sahagún towards Bilbao-Abando	Intercity	Astorga towards Vigo-Guixar
Sahagún towards Madrid Chamartín	Intercity	Terminus
Sahagún towards Madrid Chamartín	Intercity	Veguellina de Órbigo towards Vigo-Guixar
Terminus	Media Distancia 6	Quintana-Raneros towards Vigo-Guixar
Terminus	Media Distancia 17	Palanquinos towards Valladolid-Campo Grande
Terminus	Media Distancia 23	Quintana-Raneros towards Monforte de Lemos
Terminus	Media Distancia 24	Cuadros towards Gijón
