= Ouigo España =

Open-access operator of high-speed railway services in Spain

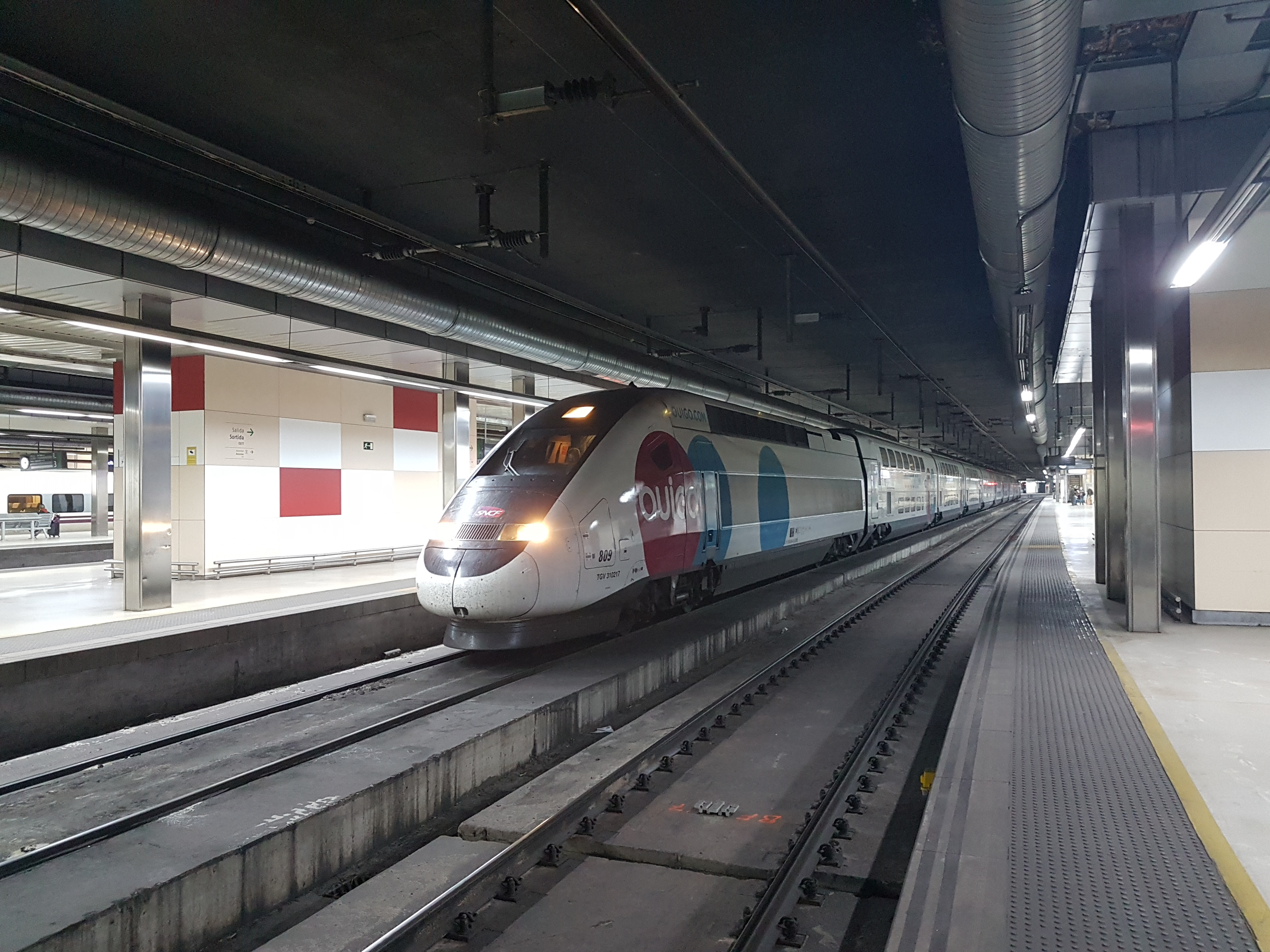
- Ouigo España TGV Euroduplex operating in Barcelona Sants station

- Current and planned services
- Legal status: Sociedad Anónima Unipersonal
- Headquarters: Calle Alfonso XII, 62, Madrid
- Website: https://www.ouigo.com/es/

Ouigo España is an open-access operator of high-speed railway services in Spain. It is a subsidiary of SNCF Voyageurs, the French national railway company, and uses its trademark Ouigo.

Ouigo España was set up in 13 December 2018 and was highly structured around SNCF's existing Ouigo domestic services in France. It competes with several other high speed operators in the Spanish market, such as the Spanish state-owned railway company Renfe's Avlo service and the open-access operator Iryo. Ouigo España had planned to launch services in December 2020, however, this was delayed in response to the COVID-19 pandemic. During May 2021, the initial service between Madrid and Barcelona was launched; within six months, one million passengers had reportedly travelled onboard its trains.

On 7 October 2022, Ouigo España inaugurated its second high-speed service between Madrid and Valencia, while services between Madrid and Alicante commenced during April 2023. The company has ambitions to launch additional routes, such as to Málaga and Seville, at some future date. Its rolling stock comprises TGV Euroduplex, which have been converted to be compatible with Spanish infrastructure.

== History ==
The company was founded on 13 December 2018, under the name of Rielsfera S.A.; on 28 September 2020, the firm changed its name to Ouigo España S.A., in line with the Ouigo brand that had been previously introduced by SNCF for its low-cost services in France. Prior to adopting the Ouigo brand, Rielsfera considered using the Falbalá brand. Beyond the naming scheme, Ouigo España will be heavily modelled on that of the existing Ouigo operation.

During the 2010s and 2020s, the Spanish state-owned railway infrastructure manager Administrador de Infraestructuras Ferroviarias (ADIF) has been conceptualising and implementing various reforms towards the liberalization of passenger rail transport. Towards this end, in November 2020, ADIF signed a framework agreement that granted it capacity in the main high-speed corridors. Ouigo España is not the only open-access operator active in the Spanish market; in addition to competing the Spanish state-owned railway company Renfe's budget high speed Avlo service, which began service in June 2021, it also faces Iryo (owned by Air Nostrum and Trenitalia), which commenced operations in late 2022.

At one point, Ouigo España had intended to inaugurate its first service during December 2020, however, it was decided to postpone the commencement of services into the first half of 2021 due to the COVID-19 pandemic. Instead, in May 2021, the initial service was launched using five pairs of purpose-converted TGV train sets to connect Madrid with Barcelona. Even prior to the launch of operations, the company had openly spoken on its plans for additional services from Madrid to Valencia, Alicante, Málaga, and Seville to be enacted at an undetermined future date. By December 2020, 14 TGV Duplex sets had been delivered to Ouigo España.

In December 2021, it was announced that one million passengers had travelled onboard services provided by Ouigo España. During August 2022, it was reported that the operator had carried roughly two million passengers in its first twelve months of operations and that SNCF's management was encouraged by these results. In October 2023, SNCF announced that in excess of five million passengers had travelled on Ouigo España's trains during the operation's first two years.

Ouigo España expanded the scope of its operations on multiple occasions; on 7 October 2022, it launched operations on the Madrid - Valencia route, its second high-speed service. During April 2023, Ouigo España's new service between Madrid and Alacante commenced using two pairs of daily trains.

Since 18 April 2024, Ouigo España offers a new daily service Madrid Chamartín–Segovia–Valladolid with 2 schedules per direction, one of them continuing to Albacete and Alicante and since 4 September 2024 the daily service Madrid Chamartín–Albacete–Elche–Murcia is in operation.

== Services ==
=== Routes ===
As of June 2025, Ouigo España operates on the following routes:

- Madrid Atocha–Barcelona Sants via Zaragoza–Delicias and Tarragona.
- Madrid Chamartín–Valencia via Cuenca.
- Madrid Chamartín–Alicante via Cuenca and Albacete.
- Madrid Chamartín–Valladolid via Segovia.
- Madrid Chamartín–Murcia via Albacete and Elche.
- Alicante–Valladolid via Albacete, Madrid Chamartín and Segovia.
- Valencia–Valladolid via Cuenca, Madrid Chamartín and Segovia.

=== Rolling stock ===
9 TGV Euroduplex trainsets are used for the service.

== See also ==
- High-speed rail in Spain
