= Valladolid-Campo Grande railway station =

Valladolid-Campo Grande
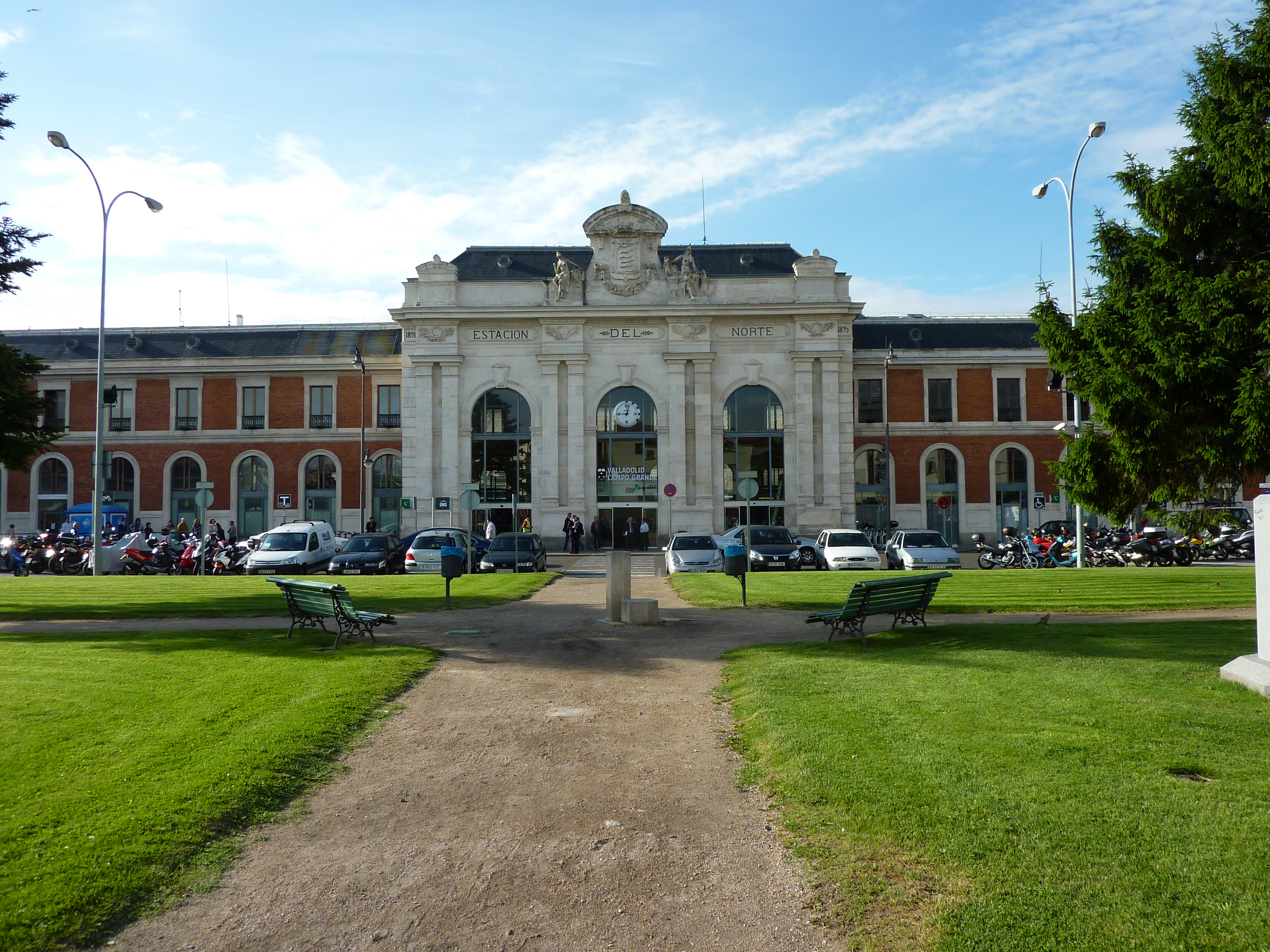
- Station façade

General information
- Owner: Adif
- Operator: Renfe
- Lines: Madrid–León high-speed rail line Madrid–Hendaye railway

Passengers
- 2018: 2,603,524
Location

Valladolid-Campo Grande railway station serves the Spanish city of Valladolid. It is served by the Madrid–León high-speed rail line to Madrid-Chamartín and regional trains to Santander, Ponferrada and Vitoria-Gasteiz.

== Services ==
Preceding station	Renfe Operadora	Following station
Madrid Chamartín Terminus	AVE	Burgos-Rosa de Lima Terminus
Madrid Chamartín Terminus	AVE	Palencia towards León
Madrid Chamartín towards Alicante	AVE	Palencia towards León
Segovia-Guiomar towards Madrid Chamartín	Alvia	Palencia towards Gijón
Segovia-Guiomar towards Madrid Chamartín	Alvia	Palencia towards Santander
Segovia-Guiomar towards Madrid Chamartín	Alvia	Burgos-Rosa de Lima towards Bilbao-Abando
Segovia-Guiomar towards Madrid Chamartín	Alvia	Burgos-Rosa de Lima towards Hendaye
Madrid Chamartín Terminus	Alvia	Palencia towards Ponferrada
Segovia-Guiomar towards Alicante	Alvia	Palencia towards Santander
Segovia-Guiomar towards Alicante	Alvia	Palencia towards Gijón
Segovia-Guiomar towards Oropesa del Mar	Alvia	Palencia towards Santander
Medina del Campo towards Salamanca	Intercity	Burgos-Rosa de Lima towards Barcelona Sants
Madrid Chamartín Terminus	Intercity	Palencia towards Santander
Madrid Chamartín Terminus	Intercity	Palencia towards Vigo-Guixar
Medina del Campo towards Madrid Chamartín	Intercity	Venta de Baños towards León
Medina del Campo towards Madrid Chamartín	Intercity	Venta de Baños towards Vitoria-Gasteiz
Medina del Campo towards Madrid Chamartín	Intercity	Venta de Baños towards Irun
Terminus	Media Distancia 14	Valladolid-Universidad towards Palencia
Viana de Cega towards Medina del Campo	Media Distancia 15	Terminus
Medina del Campo towards Madrid-Príncipe Pío	Media Distancia 16	Terminus
Terminus	Media Distancia 21	Valladolid-Universidad towards León
Medina del Campo towards Puebla de Sanabria	Media Distancia 18	Terminus
Viana de Cega towards Salamanca	Media Distancia 19	Valladolid-Universidad towards Palencia
Terminus	Media Distancia 20	Valladolid-Universidad towards Santander
Terminus	Media Distancia 21	Valladolid-Universidad towards Vitoria-Gasteiz
Segovia-Guiomar towards Madrid Chamartín	Avant 86	Terminus
