= Palencia =

- Municipality
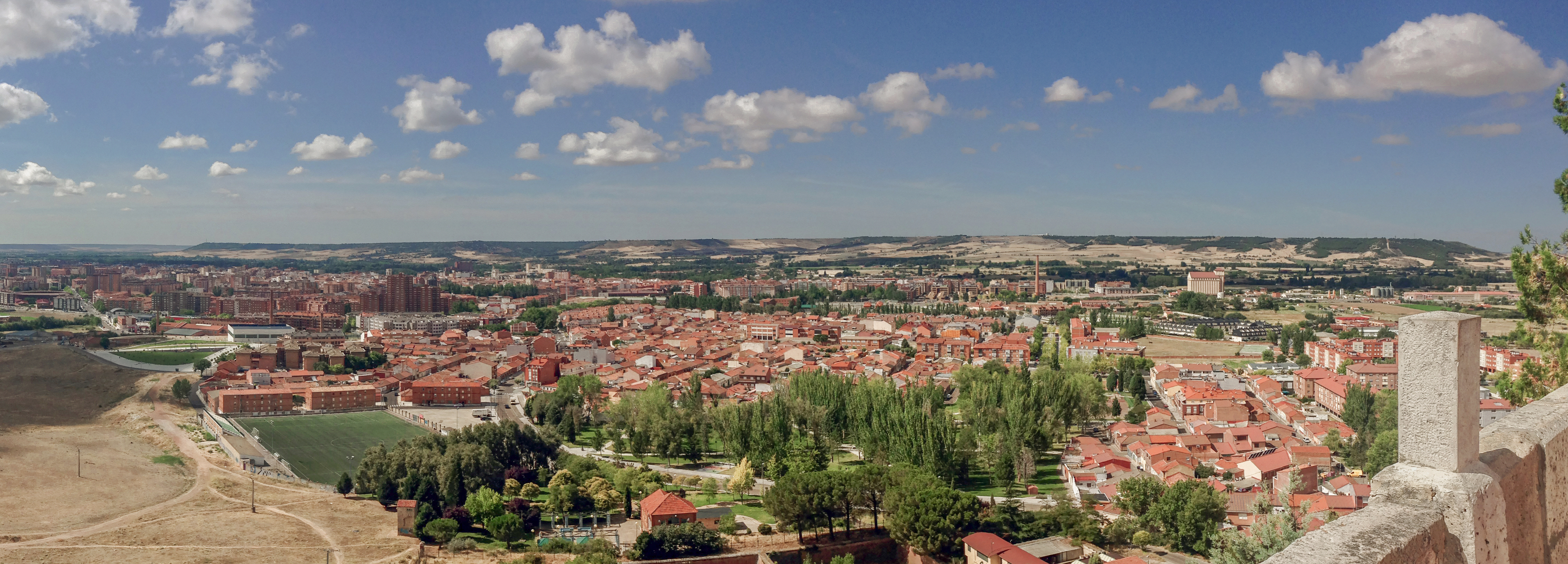
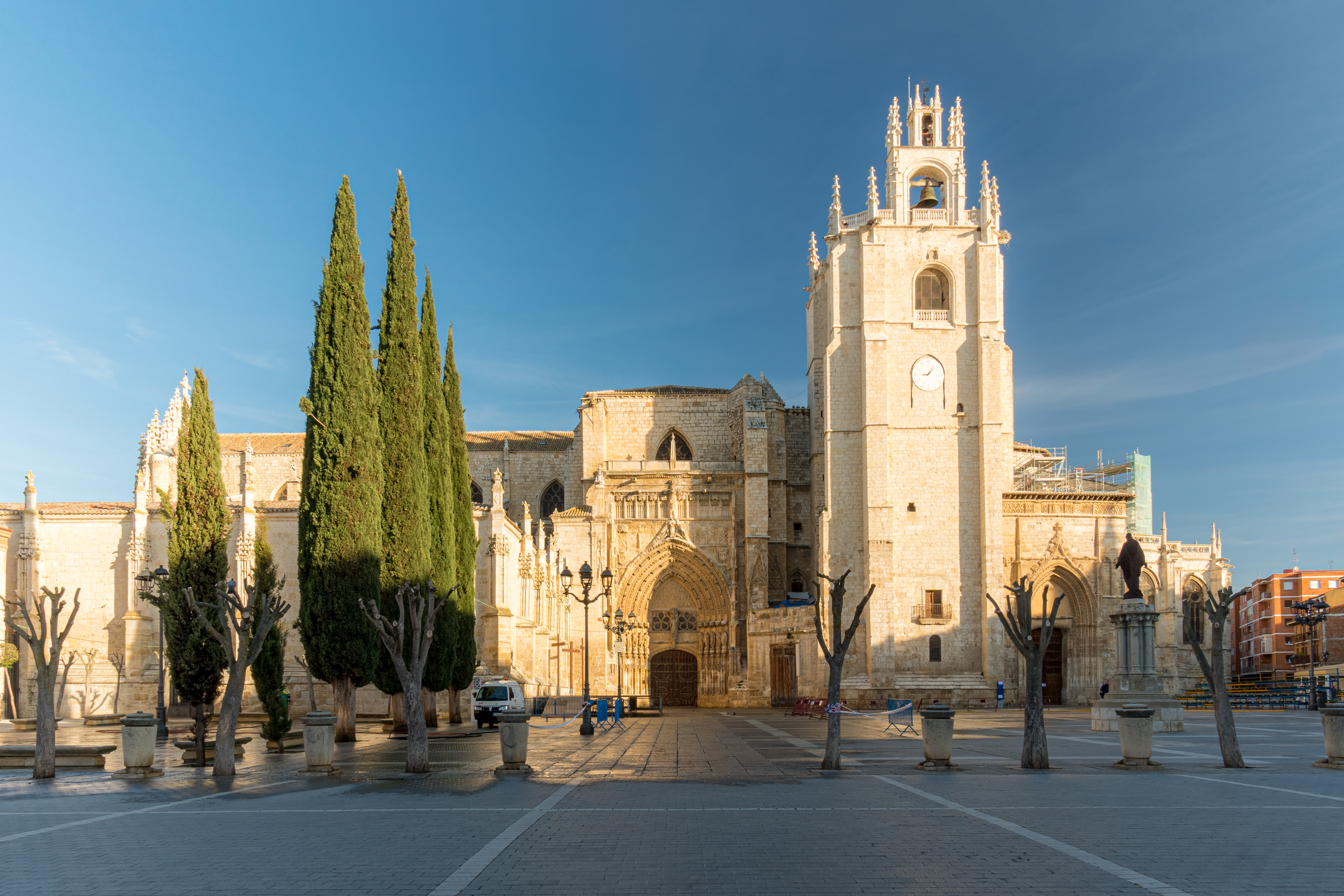
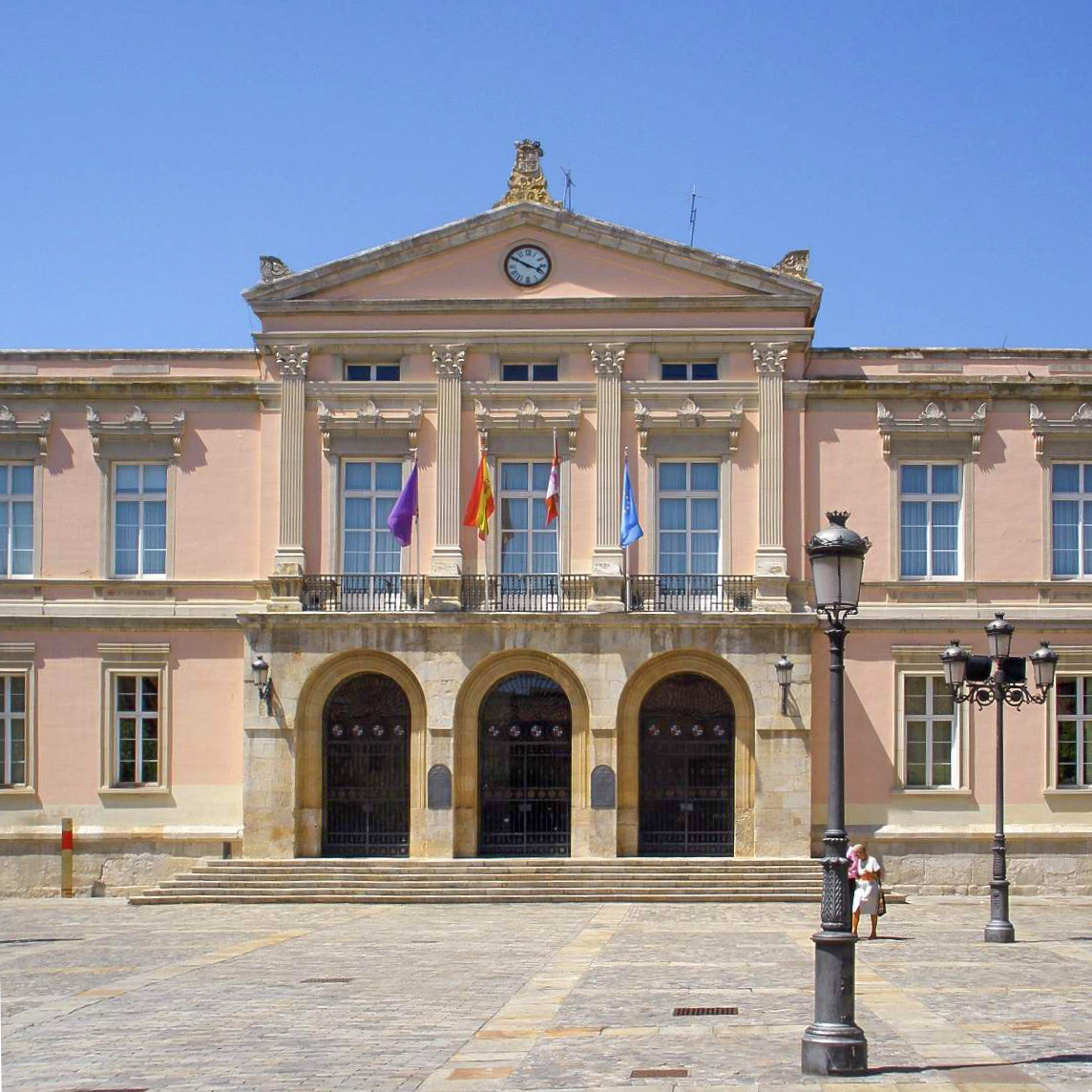
- Panoramic view Cathedral City hall

- Flag Coat of arms
- Location of Palencia
- Location within Spain
- Coordinates: 42°1′0″N 4°32′0″W
- Country: Spain
- Autonomous community: Castile and León
- Province: Palencia

Government
  - Alcalde: Miriam Andrés (PSOE)

Area
  - Total: 94.71 km^{2} (36.57 sq mi)
- Elevation: 749 m (2,457 ft)

Population (2024)
  - Total: 76,578
  - Density: 808.6/km^{2} (2,094/sq mi)
- Demonym(s): Palentino, na.
- Time zone: UTC+1 (CET)
  - Summer (DST): UTC+2 (CEST)
- Postal code: 34001–34006
- Dialing code: 979
- Official language(s): Spanish
- Website: Official website

Palencia (Spanish pronunciation: [paˈlenθja]) is a city of Spain located in the autonomous community of Castile and León. It is the capital and most populated municipality of the province of Palencia. As of 2024, it has a population of 76,578.

Located in the northwest of the Iberian Peninsula, in the northern half of the Inner Plateau, the city lies on the left bank of the Carrión river.

At the regional level, Palencia forms part of an economic axis together with the cities of Valladolid and Burgos.

== History ==
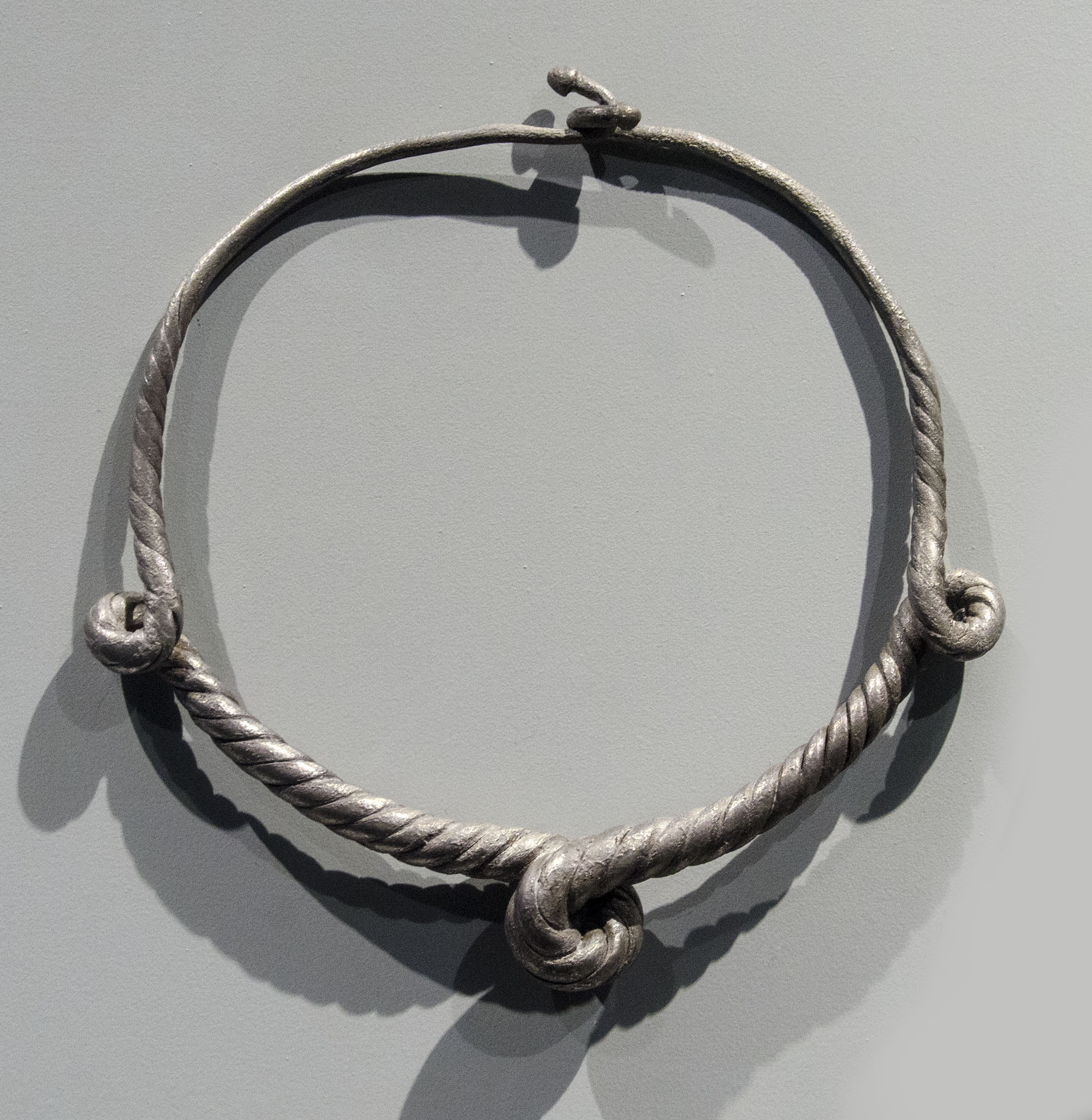
Silver bracelet found in Palencia in 1956 in the school of the Filipenses composed of silver and gold jewelry, torques, necklaces, bracelets, earrings, fibulas and a large amount of silver dinars.

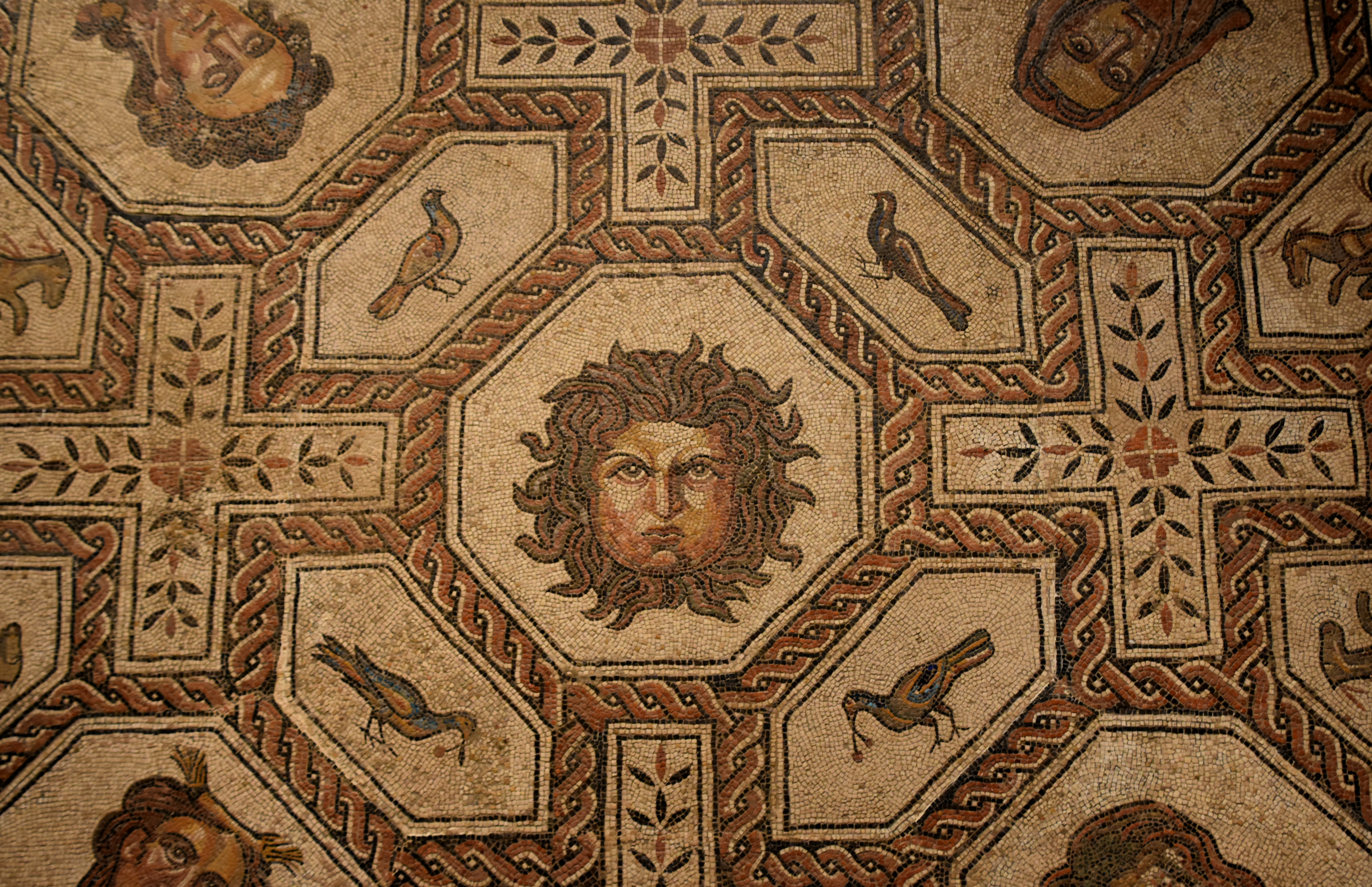
Mosaic with Medusa, found at numbers 4 and 5 of Ramírez Street in 1869 and currently preserved in the MAN.

=== Ancient era ===
The fortified Celtiberian settlement is mentioned as Pallantia (Παλλαντία) by Strabo and Ptolemy, a possible derivation of an Indo-European root pala ("plain"). It was the chief town of the Vaccaei, although Strabo wrongly assigns it to the Arevaci. The city was starved into submission by the Romans in the 2nd century BC and incorporated into the province of Hispania Tarraconensis, in the jurisdiction of Colonia Clunia Sulpicia (modern Clunia). Though the little Roman garrison city was an active mint, it was insignificant compared to the Roman villas of Late Antiquity in the surrounding territory. Archeologists have uncovered the remains of Roman villas at La Olmeda and at the "Quintanilla de la Cueza", where the fragments of mosaic floors are spectacularly refined. According to the 5th-century Galician chronicler Idatius, the city of Palencia was all but destroyed (457) in the Visigothic wars against the Suevi: the date falls in the reign of Theodoric II, whose power centre still lay far to the east, in Aquitania. When the Visigoths conquered the territory, however, they retained the Roman rural villa system in establishing the Campos Góticos ("Gothic Fields").

=== Bishopric ===
The Catholic bishopric of Palencia was founded in the 3rd century or earlier, assuming that its bishop was among those assembled in the 3rd century to depose Basilides, bishop of Astorga. Priscillianism, which originated in Roman Egypt but flourished in Iberia was declared a heresy by the emperor Gratian. Prisciallinists held orthodox Catholic beliefs with Gnostic/Montanist influences. Priscillian was ordained priest and then consecrated bishop of Ávila. The 'heresy' was strongest in northwestern Spain. The declaration of heresy was a political move by the Catholic usurper emperor Maximus (383-388) to curry favor with the Catholic emperors Valentinian II and Theodosius I (a Spaniard). After the establishment of effective Visigothic power Catholics disputed the bishopric of Palencia with the Arian Visigoths. Maurila, an Arian bishop established in Palencia by Leovigild, followed King Reccared's conversion to Catholicism (587), and in 589 he assisted at the Third Council of Toledo. Bishop Conantius, the biographer of Saint Ildephonsus, assisted at synods and councils in Toledo and composed music and a book of prayers from the Psalms; he ruled the see for more than thirty years, and had for his pupil Fructuosus of Braga.

=== Muslim rule and bishopric restoration ===
When the Moors arrived in the early 8th century, resistance was fragmented among bishops in control of the small walled towns and the territorial magnates in their fortified villas. A concerted resistance seems to have been ineffective, and the fragmented system crumbled villa by villa. Palencia was insignificant: Moorish writers only once cite the border city in the division of the provinces previous to the Umayyad dynasty. The diocese of Palencia was but a name— a "titular see"— until Froila, Count of Villafruela, succeeded in retaking the area of the see in 921, but the true restorer of Christian power was Sancho III of Navarre.

The first prelate of the restored see (1035) is said to have been Bernardo, whom Sancho gave feudal command over the city and its lands, with the various castles and the few abbeys.

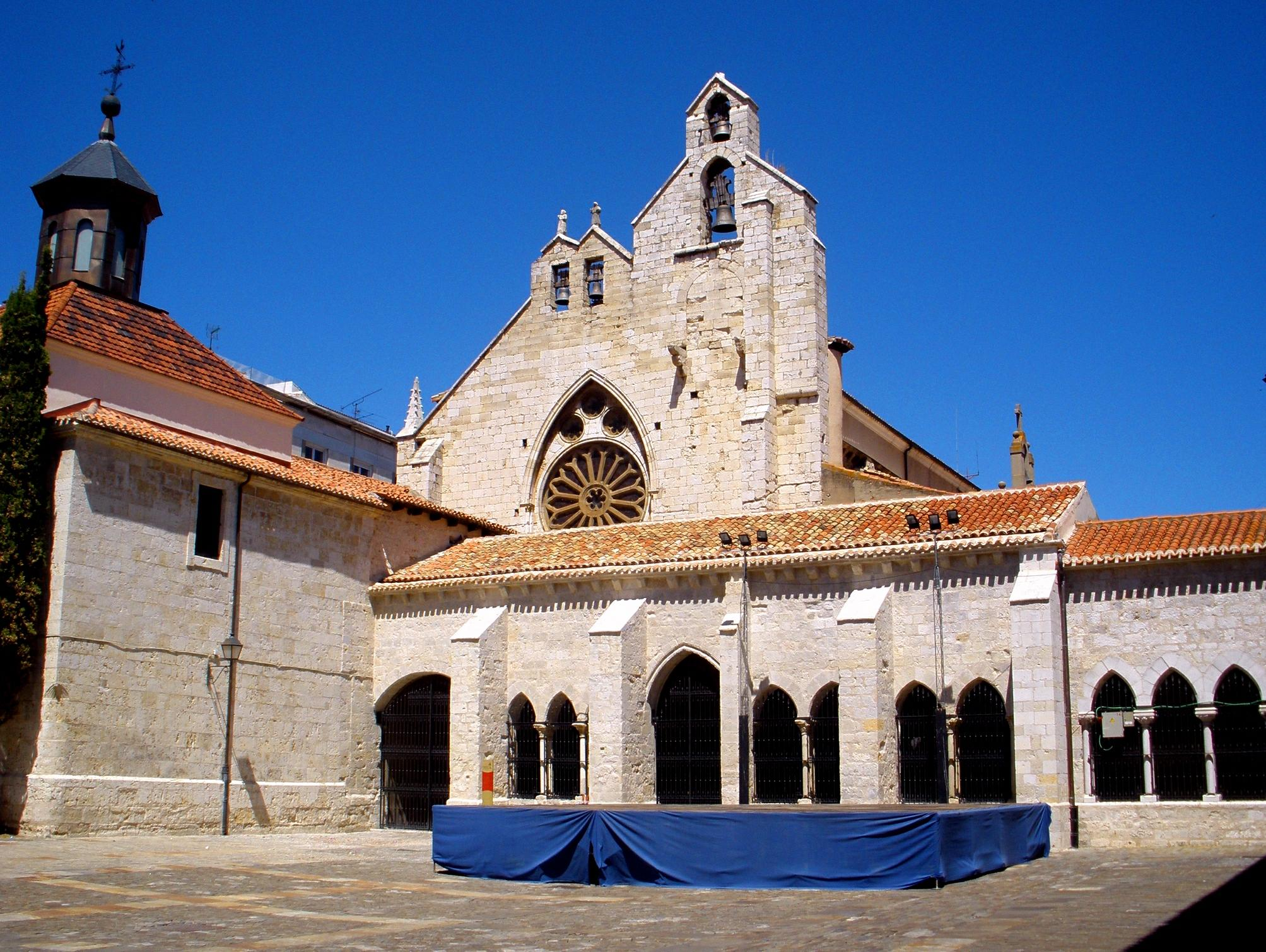
San Francisco Church, built in the 13th century.

Bernardo was born in France or Navarre, and devoted himself to the reconstruction of the original cathedral built over the crypt of the local Saint Antolín (Antoninus of Pamiers), the patron saint of Palencia, who is venerated here alone, with his Ferias, a moveable feast in September. The cathedral was rebuilt again three centuries later. Its principal treasures were relics of Antoninus, formerly venerated in Aquitania, whence they had been brought.

Alfonso VI conferred many privileges on Bernardo's successor, Raimundo. Pedro of Agen in France, one of the noted men brought in by Bishop Bernardo of Toledo, succeeded Bishop Raimundo. A supporter of Queen Urraca, he was imprisoned by Alfonso I of Aragon. In 1113 a provincial council was held in Palencia by Archbishop Bernardo to quell the disorders of the epoch. The long and beneficent administration of Pedro was succeeded by that of Pedro II, who died in Almeria and was succeeded by Raimundo II. Bishop Tello took part in the battle of Las Navas de Tolosa in 1212, where Palencia won the right to emblazon the cross over its castle.

Historically, there was a Jewish community in Palencia, with the first documentation of Jews living there dating to 1175, when Alfonso VIII transported 40 Jews to the town and placed them under its jurisdiction. Most Jews of Palencia eventually moved to Portugal in 1492 due to the expulsion of the Jews. On the eve of the expulsion, the Jews protested to the Crown that local leaders blocked the sale of their communal property, permitted under the edict. The synagogue was eventually granted to the municipality, which planned to found a hospital, though by 1495 the building was being used as a municipal abattoir.

The University of Palencia was founded in 1208, before being a University it was called Studium Generale. In the Studium Generale of Palencia studied Saint Dominic of Guzman, the Founder of the Catholic Dominican Order.

=== Later bishops ===
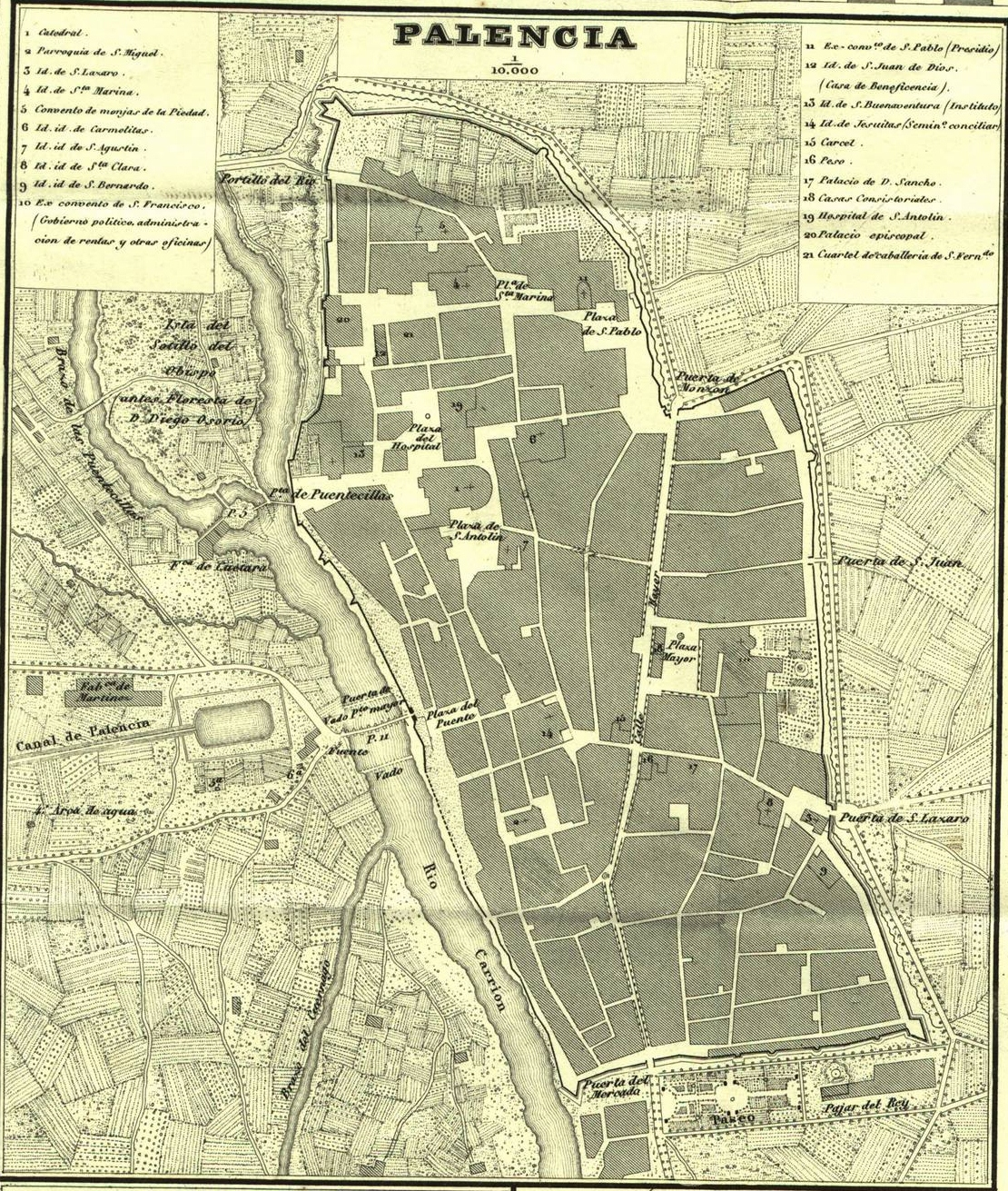
1852 map of Palencia by Francisco Coello de Portugal y Quesada.

In 1410 Bishop Sancho de Rojas fought at the battle of Antequera, where the Infante Ferdinand, regent of Castile and León, defeated Mohammed VII, king of Granada, and in the Treaty of Caspe he aided Ferdinand to secure the crown of Aragon. Saint Vincent Ferrer preached in Palencia, so successfully converting thousands of Jews, the Catholic sources tell, that he was permitted to employ the synagogue for his new-founded hospital of San Salvador, later joined to that of S. Antolin.

The successive bishops of Palencia, who, as feudal lords, were invariably members of the noble families, include:

- Munio de Zamora
- Sancho el Rojo
- Rodrigo de Velasquito (died 1435)
- Pedro de Castilla (1440–1461)
- Rodrigo Sanchez de Arévalo, author of a history of Spain in Latin (1466)
- Iñigo López de Mendoza (1472–actually)
- Fray Alonso de Burgos (1485–1499)
- Bishop Fonseca (1505–1514)
- La Gasca (1550–1561)
- Zapata (1569–1577)
- Alvaro de Mendoza

== Geography ==
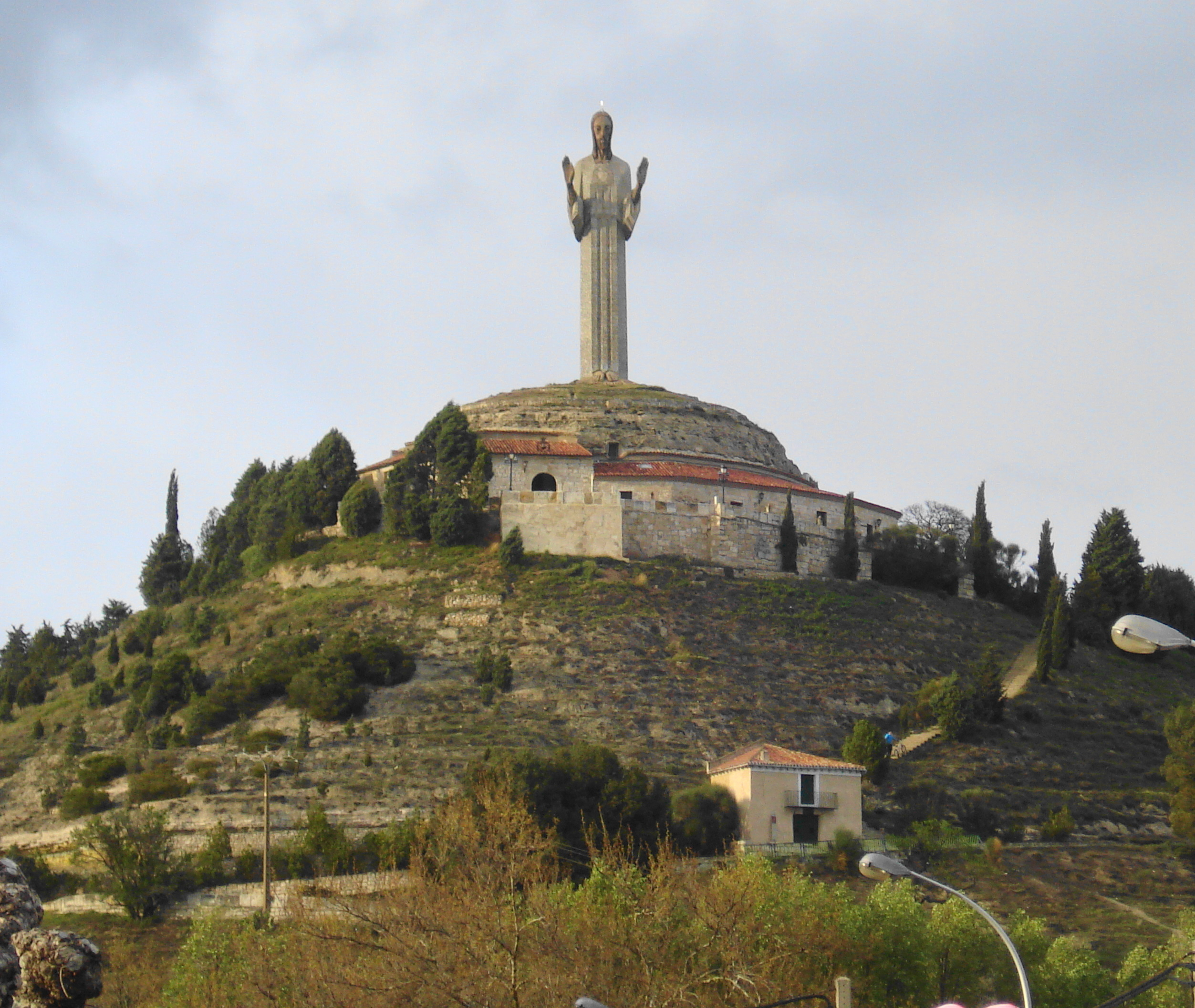
View of the Cristo del Otero hill. The colossal statue of Jesus is reportedly the fourth-largest in the world.

Palencia lies in the north of the central Spanish plateau, the Meseta Central, in the middle of the Carrión river valley, near the river's confluence with the Pisuerga, which flows through the town creating four islets, Dos Aguas and Sotillo being the largest. Palencia is located approximately 190 km north of Madrid, and some 40 km north of Valladolid, capital of Castile and León.

Two hills surround the city in its north-east area. On the closest stands the 21-metre high statue of Christ known as the Cristo del Otero, the tallest statue of Christ in Spain.

Palencia has a substantial forest of 1,438 hectares (3,550 acres) 6 km away on a plateau above the city, known locally as the "Monte el Viejo" ("Old Mount"). This park is a popular amusement area for the locals.

The Canal de Castilla runs close to the city.

Palencia's municipality includes the village of Paredes de Monte, 14 km away.

=== Climate ===
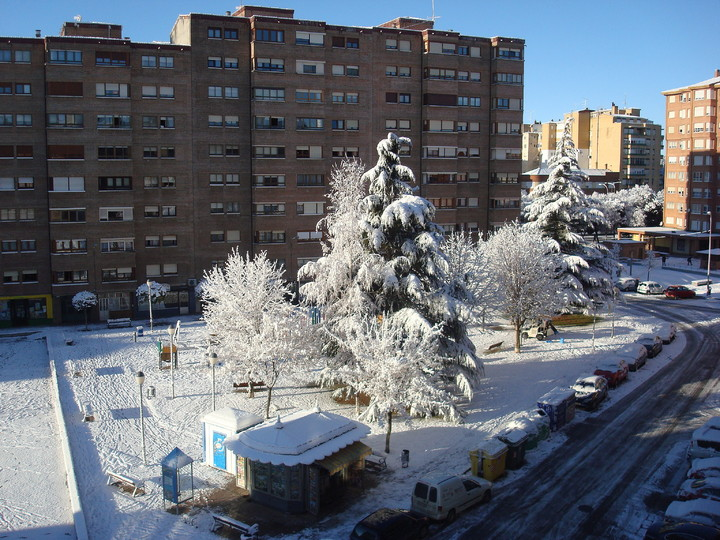
The San Juanillo neighborhood after a snowfall

The region of Palencia has a Continental Mediterranean climate with cool winters, due to altitude (749 m) and isolation from maritime influences, chilly winds, including some days of snow in the winter and minimum temperatures usually below 0 °C (32 °F). Fog is frequent because of the Carrion river. Summers are hot with temperatures that consistently surpass 30 °C (86 °F) in July and that can rarely reach 38 °C (99 °F). Due to Palencia's altitude, nightly temperatures tend to be cooler, leading to a lower average in the summer months. Precipitation levels are moderated, but precipitation can be observed throughout the year (except July and August). Summer and winter are the driest seasons, with most rainfall occurring in the autumn and spring.

Light rains are very frequent in winter, with infrequent rain and heavy thunderstorms in the summer. Snow is an infrequent occurrence, with only a few days of snowfall each year in December, January, and February, however, snowfall can also occur in November or March.

Climate data for Palencia
Month	Jan	Feb	Mar	Apr	May	Jun	Jul	Aug	Sep	Oct	Nov	Dec	Year
Mean daily maximum °C (°F)	7.5 (45.5)	10.1 (50.2)	13.9 (57.0)	16.7 (62.1)	21 (70)	25.2 (77.4)	29.4 (84.9)	29 (84)	24.3 (75.7)	17.9 (64.2)	11.6 (52.9)	8.1 (46.6)	17.9 (64.2)
Daily mean °C (°F)	3.4 (38.1)	5.0 (41.0)	8.0 (46.4)	10.2 (50.4)	13.9 (57.0)	17.9 (64.2)	20.9 (69.6)	20.6 (69.1)	17.1 (62.8)	12.2 (54.0)	7.1 (44.8)	4.3 (39.7)	11.7 (53.1)
Mean daily minimum °C (°F)	−0.7 (30.7)	−0.1 (31.8)	2.1 (35.8)	3.7 (38.7)	6.8 (44.2)	10.7 (51.3)	12.4 (54.3)	12.2 (54.0)	9.9 (49.8)	6.5 (43.7)	2.6 (36.7)	0.5 (32.9)	5.6 (42.0)
Average precipitation mm (inches)	47 (1.9)	35 (1.4)	41 (1.6)	53 (2.1)	54 (2.1)	33 (1.3)	18 (0.7)	15 (0.6)	31 (1.2)	58 (2.3)	56 (2.2)	50 (2.0)	491 (19.4)
Average precipitation days	6	5	6	8	7	5	3	2	4	7	7	6	66
Average relative humidity (%)	83	75	66	65	59	50	44	44	52	66	79	81	64
Mean daily daylight hours	10.1	11.1	12.5	13.9	15.1	15.8	15.4	14.3	12.9	11.5	10.3	9.7	12.7
Source 1: Climate-data.org
Source 2: Weatherbase (daylight hours)

== Demographics ==
Historical population
Year	Pop.	±%
1842	11,480	—
1857	12,811	+11.6%
1877	14,526	+13.4%
1887	15,277	+5.2%
1900	15,610	+2.2%
1910	17,710	+13.5%
1920	20,016	+13.0%
1930	24,332	+21.6%
1940	32,469	+33.4%
1950	41,122	+26.7%
1960	47,902	+16.5%
1970	56,816	+18.6%
1981	71,716	+26.2%
1991	77,863	+8.6%
2001	79,797	+2.5%
2011	81,089	+1.6%
2021	77,086	−4.9%
Source: INE

Palencia's population has decreased since 2011, from 81,089 inhabitants in 2011 to 76,578 in 2024. The town has historically been a centre for immigration from other parts of Spain, particularly between 1950 and 1970 receiving rural immigrants helping industrial development. Nevertheless, today, it has a population with more retirees than the average, due to youth emigration to larger urban centres such as Valladolid, Madrid or Barcelona.

== Main sights ==
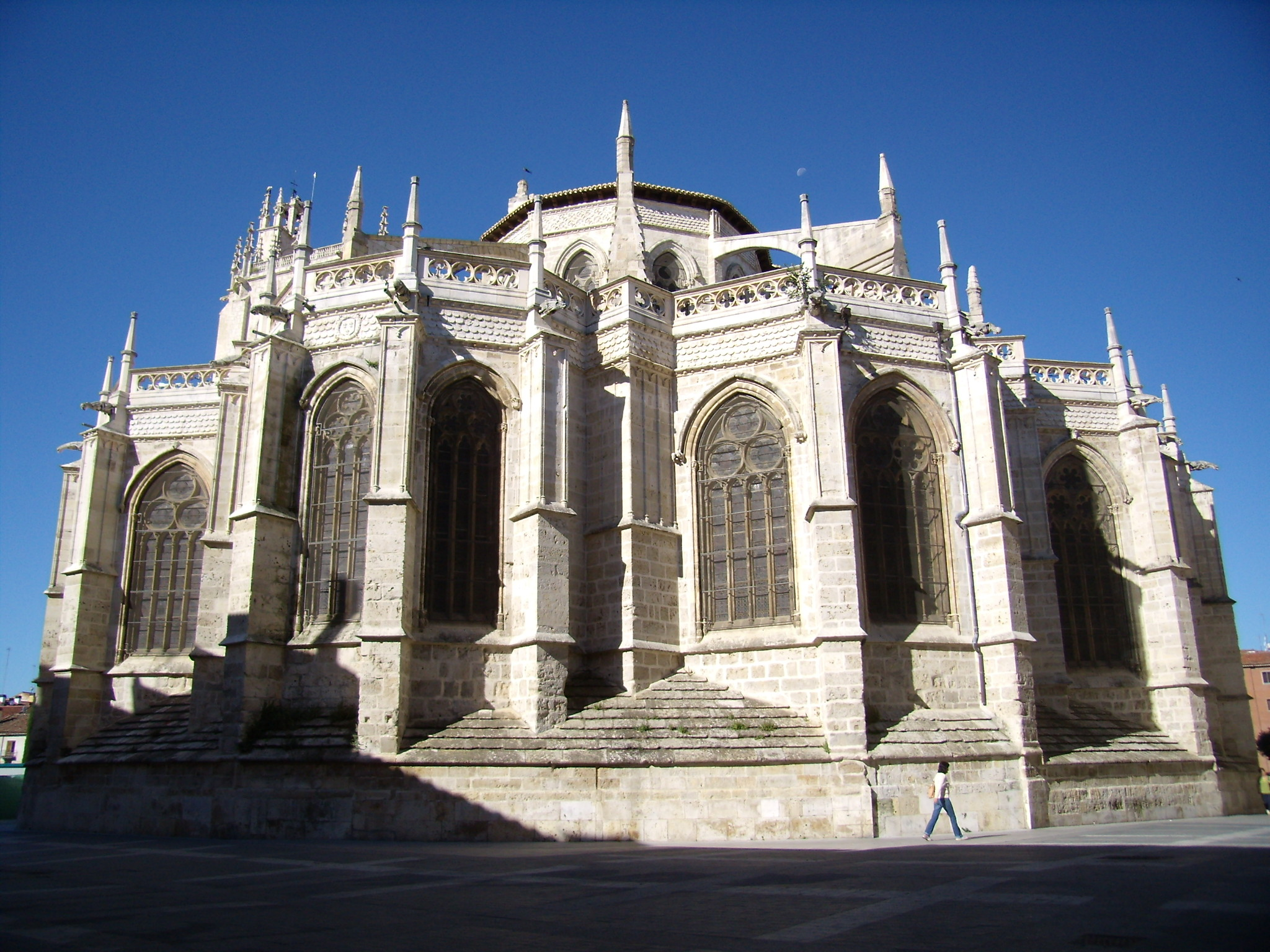
Cathedral of Palencia's apse

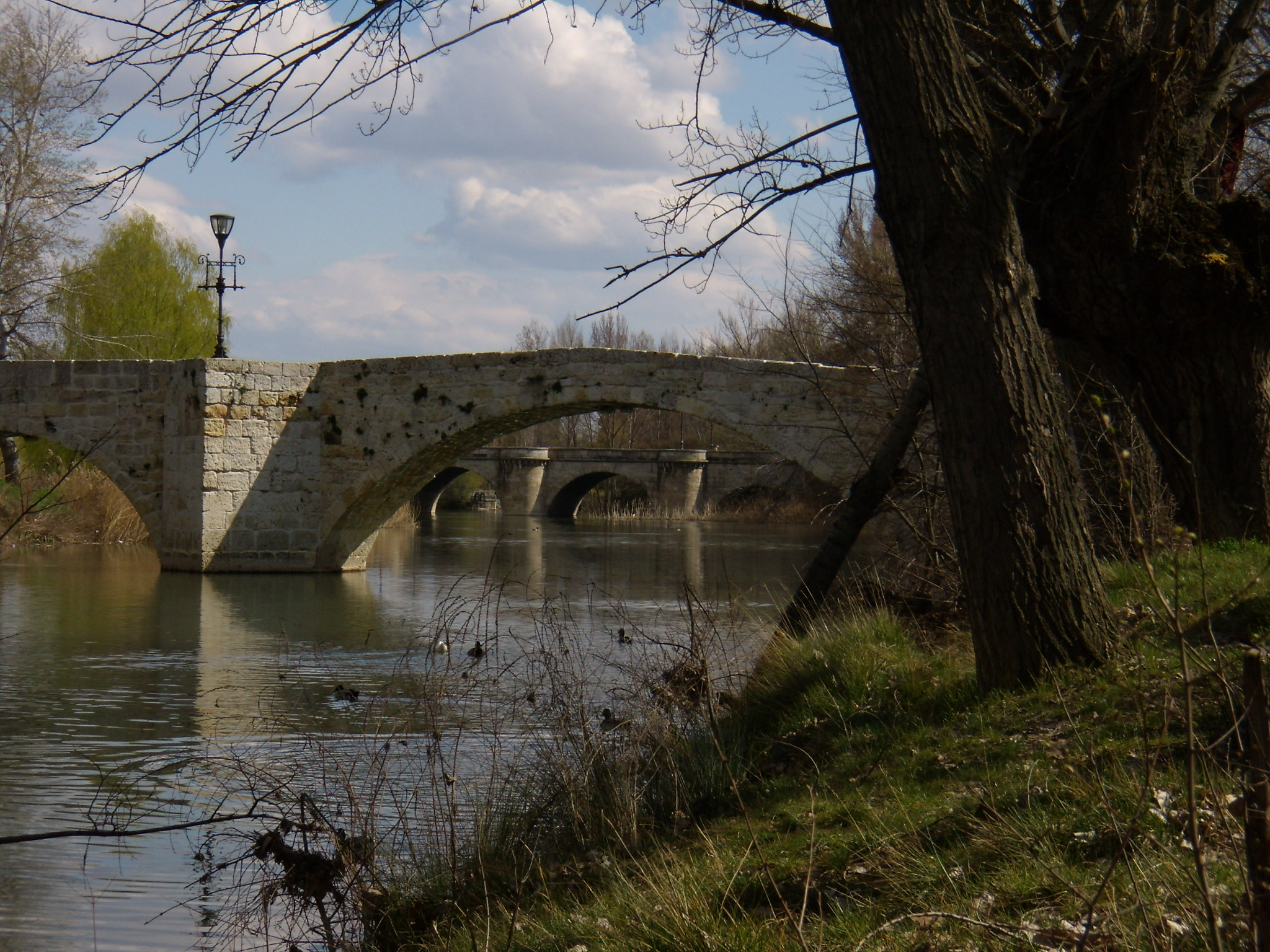
Puentecillas, a Roman bridge.

The Roman bridge across the Carrión river was replaced by the medieval one of three arches: the old section of the city is on the left bank, the modern suburban development is on the right bank: it seems likely that the first inhabitants settled on the right bank, and later moved to the left bank—set on higher ground—due to frequent flooding.

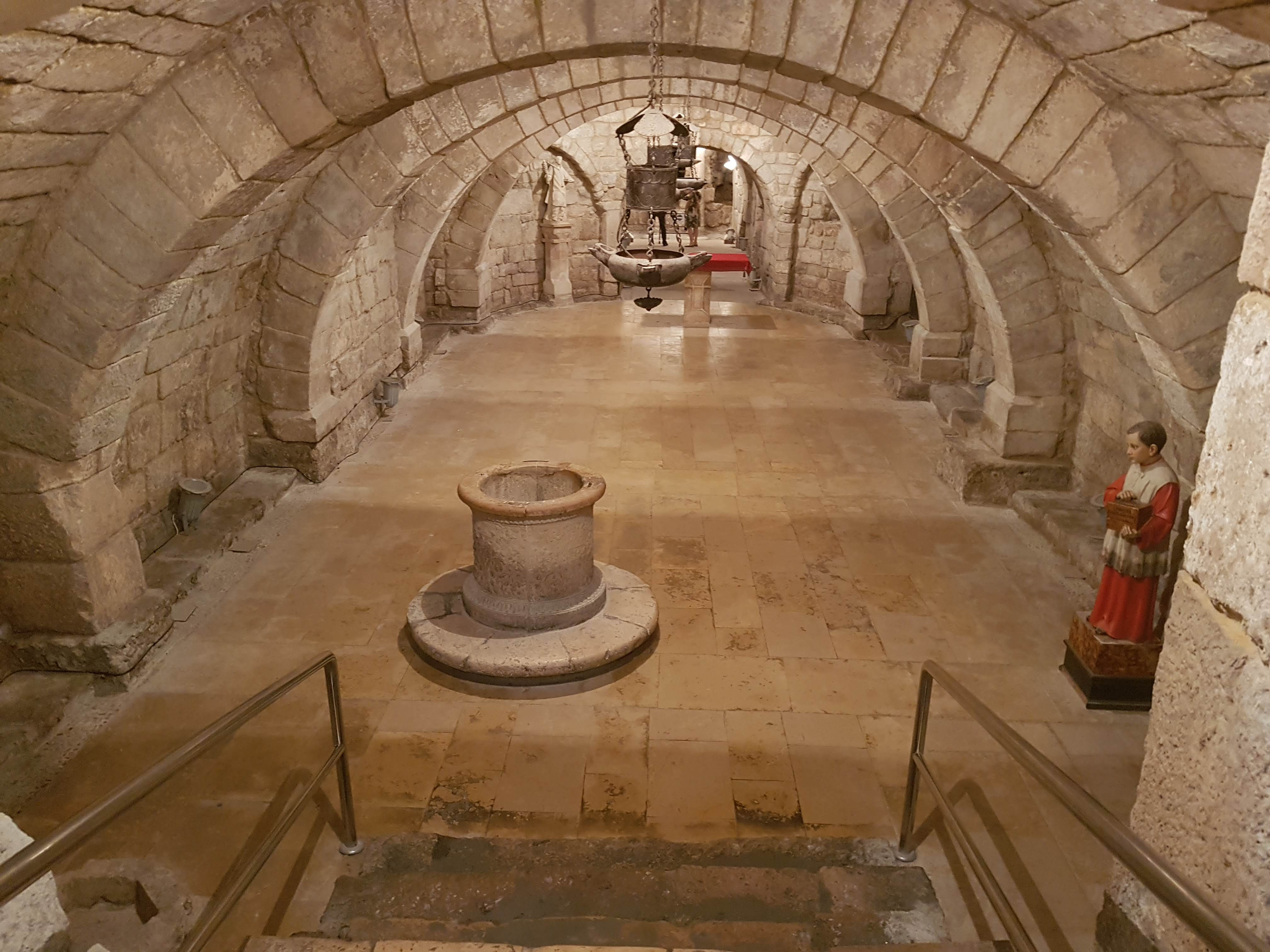
Crypt of Saint Antoninus, Cathedral of Palencia

La Olmeda Roman Villa (Villa Romana de La Olmeda) is a well-preserved 4th century AD house. With 27 rooms and 3,000 square metres of space, it is best known for its mosaics, the most important of which depict great mythological scenes and can be found in its main hall. Several of the rooms in the villa also contain the remains of the Roman hypocausts. In addition to the main building, the villa site is surrounded by other Roman ruins such as numerous burial sites and a set of thermal baths.

The old city walls were more than 10 meters high and can still be traced; the alamedas or promenades along them were laid out in 1778. The flamboyant Gothic Cathedral, built from 1321 to 1504 and dedicated to San Antolín, stands over a low vaulted Visigothic crypt; its museum contains a number of important works of art, including a retablo of twelve panels by Juan de Flandes, court painter to Queen Isabella I of Castile. The Archeological Museum contains Celtiberian ceramics.

Palencia is also famous for the 13th-century church of San Miguel, the San Francisco church. The Calle Mayor (High Street), is a pedestrian, 900-metres long street where many excellent examples of the 18th, 19th and early 20th-century architecture can be seen.

Thirteen kilometres south of the city, in the village of Baños de Cerrato, is the oldest church on the peninsula, a 7th-century basilica dedicated to Saint John and built by the Visigoth King Reccaswinth (died 672). The Plaza de toros de Palencia, a 10,000-capacity bullring, is located in Palencia. It opened in 1976.

== Nature ==
=== Vegetation ===
The countryside is green from October into June, as it is altered by the snow and the invernal ice. From June or July the countryside becomes a dry place.

The city has the largest landscaped area of Spain in relation to its surface area and is one of the largest in Europe. (15,000,000 m^{2} of gardens in the village: Isabel II Park, Jardinillos Station, Orchard Guadián, La Carcavilla, among others and 14,000,000 "Old Mount") In 2010 the city of Palencia won the "most sustainable city in Spain".

=== Parks in Palencia ===
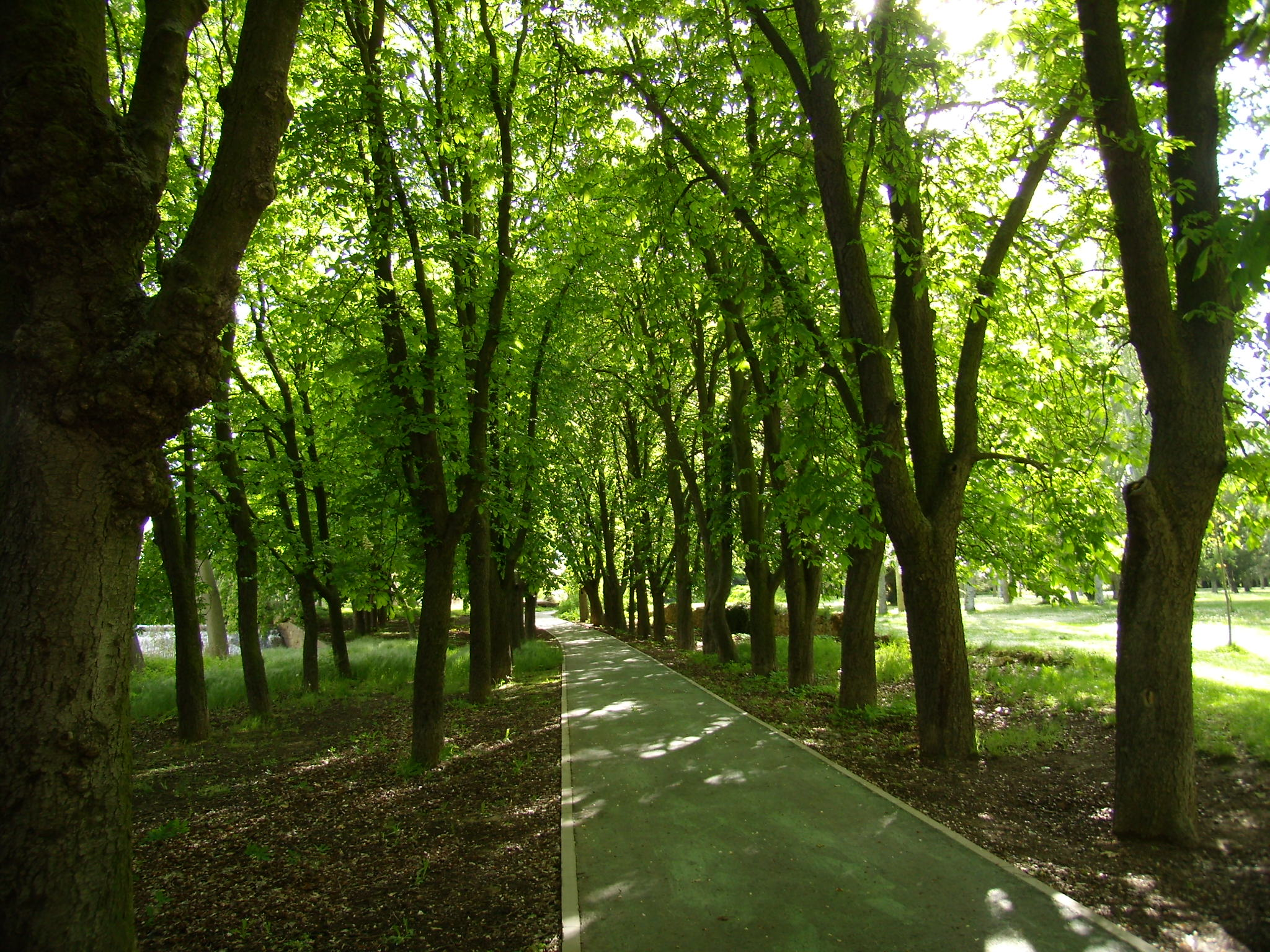
Paseo de los Canónigos

According to the Municipality of the capital, Palencia is the city with more green areas per inhabitant of Spain and occupies one of the first places in the European Union. This, coupled with the low density of traffic causes that the city air is fairly clean. The main parks in the city are:

Biggest parks in the city:

- Salón de Isabel II (called usually "El Salón")
- Huerta de Guadián
- Jardinillos de la Estación (known simply as "Jardinillos")
- Parque-Isla Dos Aguas
- Sotillo de los Canónigos
- Huertas del Obispo
- Carcavilla
- Parque Ribera Sur

== Education ==
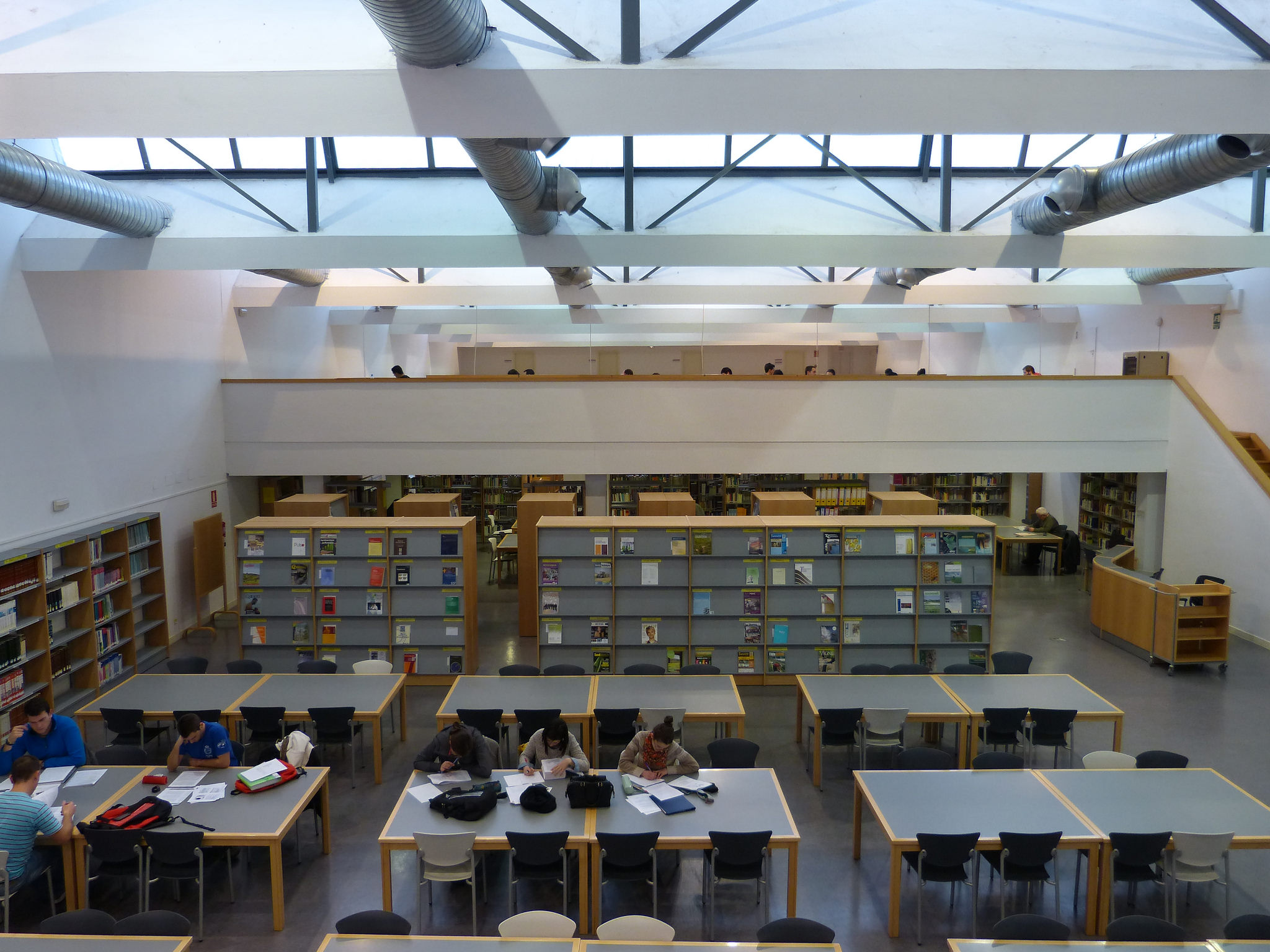
Library in La Yutera Campus

The first university in Spain, the studium generale of Palencia was founded by Alfonso VIII in 1208; however, the school did not long survive him. The 13th-century poet Gonzalo de Berceo and Saint Dominic, Founder of the Dominican Catholic Order, studied at the University during its brief existence. The teachers from Palencia were drawn to the thriving University of Salamanca and the University of Valladolid, but the very important religious orders remained in Palencia, under the Bishop of Palencia.

The University of Valladolid (UVA) has a campus in Palencia (La Yutera Campus), inaugurated in 2002.

== Transport ==
=== Roads ===
Palencia is well-linked to other town and cities of Spain by roads and highways:

Highways

A - 62 Valladolid / Madrid

A - 65 Benavente/ León / Asturias / Galicia

A - 67 Santander

CL - 610 => A -62 Burgos / Bilbao / Zaragoza / Barcelona

Autonomic Roads

C - 613 Sahagún

C - 615 Guardo / Riaño

C - 619 Aranda de Duero / Soria

In addition, Palencia has a bus station located next to the train station. ALSA and other bus companies link Palencia to many Spanish cities and towns and it is especially useful for travelling to places not linked by train, such as the south-west of Spain.

=== Railways ===
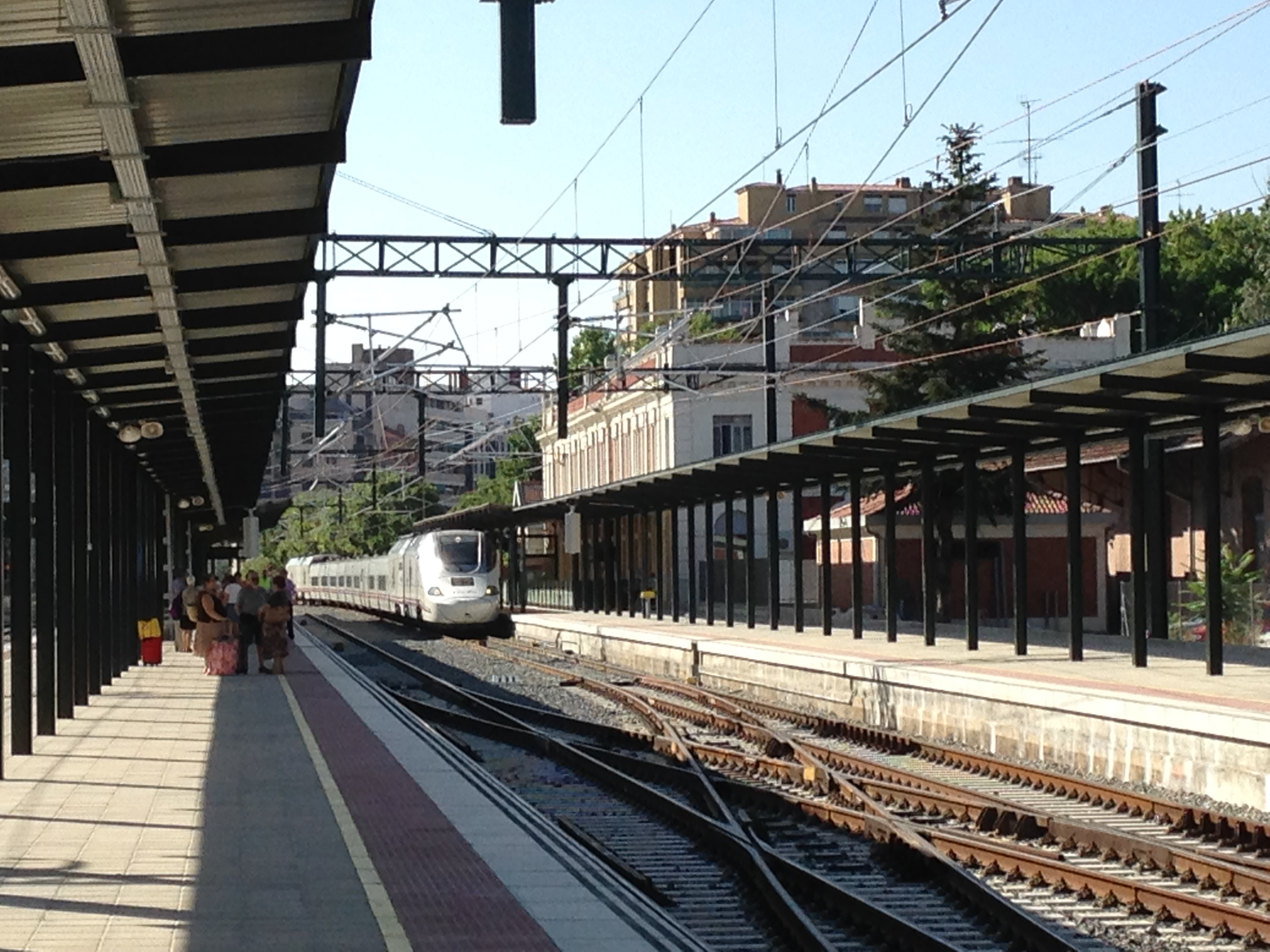
Platform of the Palencia railway station

The city also has a busy railway station, given its strategic location as a hub for north and north-west railway connections in Spain. There are several services from Palencia railway station to Valladolid-Campo Grande, Madrid (Chamartín and Príncipe Pío), León, Burgos, Vitoria-Gasteiz and Santander, 3 daily trains to Barcelona Sants, Bilbao-Abando, A Coruña, Santiago, Oviedo and Zaragoza-Delicias, 1 daily train to Albacete-Los Llanos and Alicante.

=== Air transport ===
Valladolid Airport is the closest airport to the city at 45 kilometres.

=== Public transport ===
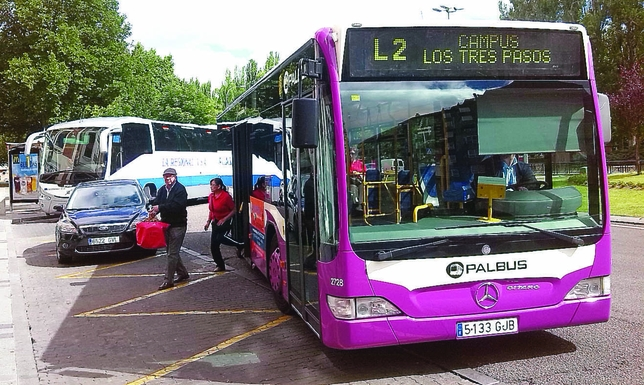
A bus line 2

Palencia has a bus service formed by 6 daily lines, named with numbers, managed by Palbus. The fleet is 18 buses. It has one of the lowest fares of Spain (€0.65). There are 26 stops with electronic panels with the arriving of the next buses. The number of users per day in 2012 was 8,195, which is 2,900,000 per year. There is also a night bus, an electric bus, free Wi-Fi in all buses and intelligent systems with voice at the buses announcing the stops.

Lines
Line	Path	Hours weekdays	Hours Saturdays	Hours Sundays	Frequency Monday to Saturday	Frequency Sundays
Line 1	San Antonio - Campus	6:40 to 22:30	6:40 to 22:30	8:30 to 22:30	20 minutes	30 minutes
Line 2	Camino de la Miranda - Campus	6:30/7:00 to 22:50	6:30/7:00 to 22:50	8:15 to 22:15	15/20 minutes	30 minutes
Line 3	Hospital Río Carrión - San Telmo	7:00 to 22:30	7:00 to 22:30	7:30 to 22:30	30 minutes	30 minutes
Line 4	6:30 to 22:00	6:30 to 22:00	9:00 to 22:00	60 minutes	60 minutes	
Line 5	Cristo del Otero - Hospital Río Carrión	7:00 to 21:30	7:00 to 14:30	No service	60 minutes	Sin servicio
Line 6	Plaza de León - Mount "el Viejo"	11:30 to 21:00	11:30 to 21:00	11:30 to 21:00	60 minutes	60 minutes

=== Sustainable mobility ===
Palencia is making efforts in the area of sustainable mobility, such as extending a free bicycle loan system, implementing pedestrian areas in the town center and promoting environmentally sustainable public transport.

== Cuisine ==
The main speciality of Palencia is locally produced lechazo (suckling lamb). Traditionally suckling lamb is roasted slowly in a wood oven and served with salad. "Menestra de Verduras" is a mixture of vegetables cooked with chopped pieces Spanish ham, onion, garlic and spices is another traditional dish.

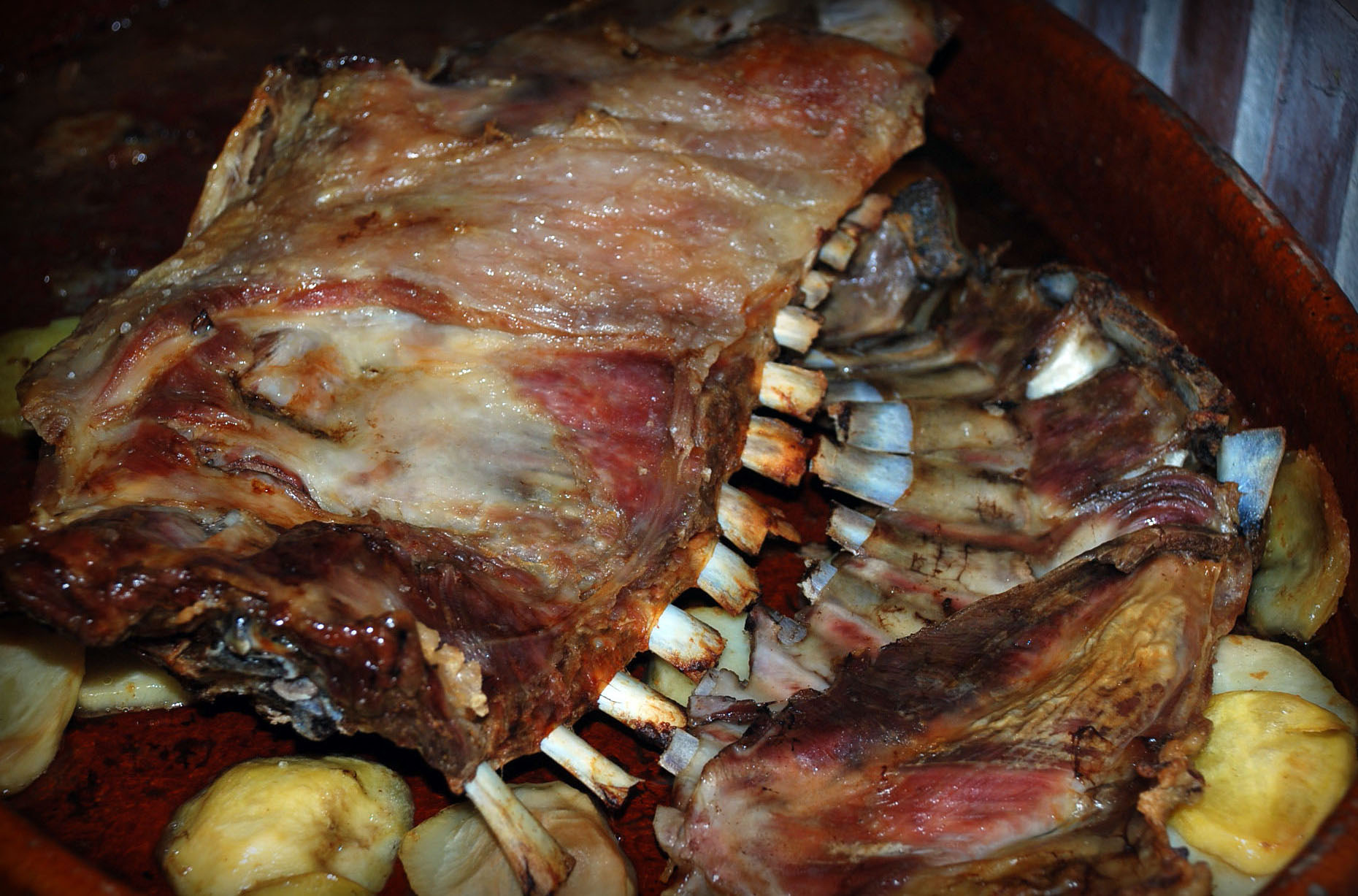
Roasted lamb rack

Palencia also offers a great assortment of lettuces, leeks, wild mushrooms, peppers, asparagus, endives and beans. Some legumes, like white beans and lentils are particularly good and cooked in hot dishes with chorizo.

The sopa de ajo, a traditional winter garlic soup dish, made with bread mixed with paprika, water and garlic and cooked slowly. A raw egg is often whipped into the soup as it is served.

Morcilla is a form of black sausage made from pig's blood. In Castile the pig blood is often flavoured with pieces of pork fat, onions herbs and spices; the addition of rice gives a distinctive texture and flavour.

Despite being an inland province, fish is quite commonly consumed. Brought from the Cantabrian Sea, fish such as red bream and hake are a major part of Palencia's cuisine. Salted cod is another common dish.

Rivers from the Cantabric Mountains bring the famous trout, grilled with bacon. Crayfish is cooked with a thick tomato and onion sauce.

Palencia has a variety of different breads including fabiolas, roscas or panes.

The pastries and baked goods from the province of Palencia are well-known. Rice pudding and leche frita or fried milk (a mix of milk, sugar, flour and cinnamon with a delicious and jelly-like texture) are favourite desserts.

Palencia is also a producer of wines. Those that are certified as Designation of Origin Arlanza are improving with a taste similar to those of Ribera del Duero and Toro.

== Notable people ==
- Sara Bayón (born 1981), Spanish rhythmic gymnast and coach
- Pablo Casado (born 1981), Spanish politician, former president of People's Party and Leader of the Opposition.
- Gonzalo Diéguez y Redondo (1897-1955), diplomat
- Marta Huerta de Aza (born 1990), football referee
- Sofía Tartilán (1829-1888), novelist, essayist, journalist, editor

== See also ==
- List of Spanish cities
- Palencia (province)
- List of municipalities in Palencia
- Palencia mining basin
