= Medina del Campo AV railway station =

Building in Valladolid Province, Spain

Medina del Campo AV
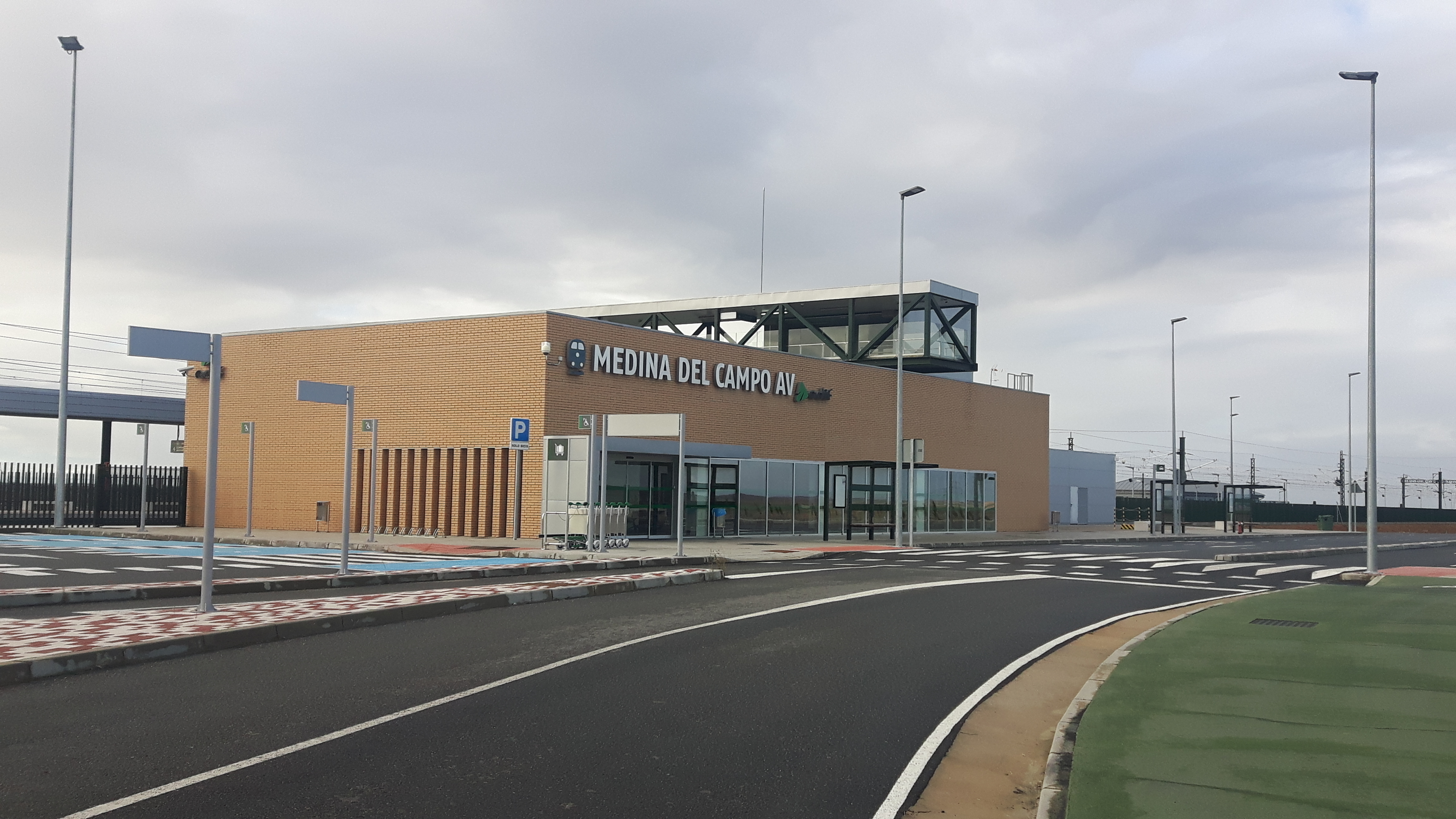

General information
- Coordinates: 41.290633°N 4.923183°W
- Owner: Adif
- Operator: Renfe
- Line: Madrid–Galicia high-speed rail line
- Platforms: 2

History
- Opened: 1 February 2016

Passengers
- 2018: 31,641
Location

Medina del Campo AV railway station (Medina del Campo Alta Velocidad) is a railway station serving the Spanish town of Medina del Campo in Castile and León. It is served by the Spanish AVE high-speed rail system, on the partially Madrid–Galicia high-speed rail line.

== History ==
In 2015 Ferrovial announced it would be building the AVE high-speed rail station at Medina del Campo, with 4 tracks and two platforms measuring 400m in length. The station was opened on February 1, 2016, at a cost of €3.6 million.

Preceding station	Renfe Operadora	Following station
Segovia-Guiomar towards Madrid Chamartín	Alvia	Zamora towards Ferrol
Segovia-Guiomar towards Madrid Chamartín	Alvia	Zamora towards Lugo
Segovia-Guiomar towards Madrid Chamartín	Alvia	Zamora towards Pontevedra
Segovia-Guiomar towards Madrid Chamartín	Alvia	Zamora towards Vigo-Urzáiz
