= Santander railway station =

Railway station in Santander, Spain

Santander
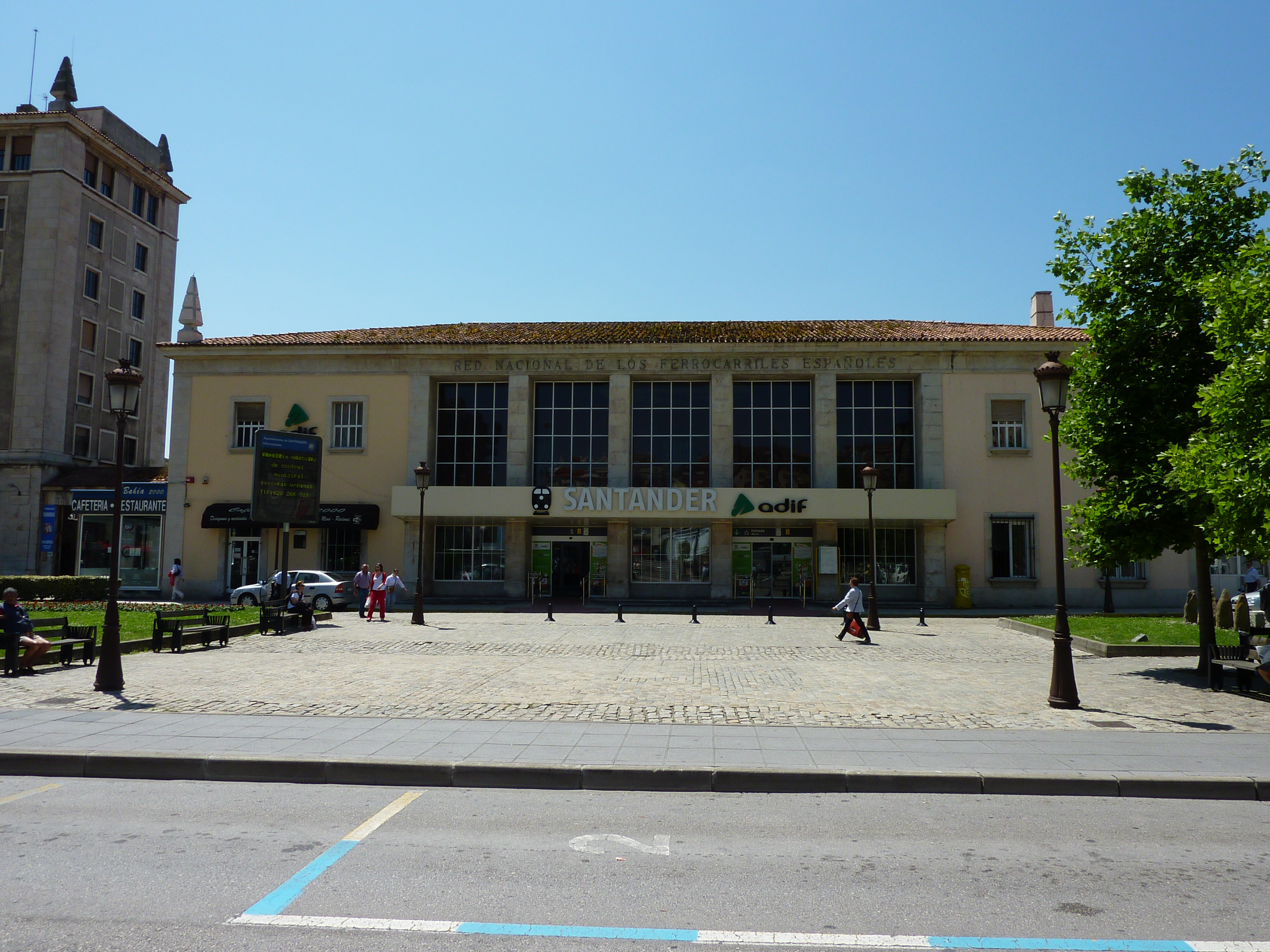
- Main façade of the ADIF station

General information
- Location: Santander, Cantabria, Spain
- Coordinates: 43.4591°N 3.8114°W
- Owner: Adif
- Operator: Renfe
- Lines: Iberian-gauge: Palencia–Santander; Metre-gauge: Trubia–Santander; Santander-Bilbao

History
- Opened: 11 October 1858

Passengers
- 2018: 3,072,339 ( )
Location

Santander railway station, also known as Santander ADIF to distinguish it from the Santander Feve station (note both are currently owned by Adif) is the main railway station of the Spanish city of Santander, Cantabria. It opened in 1858 and served over 3 million passengers in 2018. The station is actually a complex of two stations, one serving Iberian-gauge railways, and another adjacent serving metre-gauge services to Bilbao-Abando and Oviedo.

== Services ==
Alvia services use the Madrid–León high-speed rail line as far as Palencia, and switches to the conventional rail network to serve Santander, and one Media Distancia service operates on the classic line between Santander and Valladolid-Campo Grande. The metre-gauge services from Santander link it to Oviedo and Bilbao. The Transcantábrico tourist train also stops here. The first Cercanías Santander commuter rail lines also begin at the station, with the other two beginning at the other one

Preceding station	Renfe Operadora	Following station
Torrelavega towards Madrid Chamartín	Alvia	Terminus
Torrelavega towards Alicante	Alvia	Terminus
Torrelavega towards Madrid Chamartín	Intercity	Terminus
Renedo towards Valladolid-Campo Grande	Media Distancia 20	Terminus
Torrelavega towards Oviedo	Media Distancia R-2	Terminus
Valdecilla towards Bilbao-Concordia	Media Distancia R-3	Terminus
Cercanías Santander
Valdecilla toward Reinosa	C-1	Terminus
Valdecilla toward Cabezón de la Sal	C-2	Terminus
Valdecilla toward Liérganes	C-3	Terminus
