= Ponferrada railway station =

Railway station in Ponferrada, Spain

Ponferrada
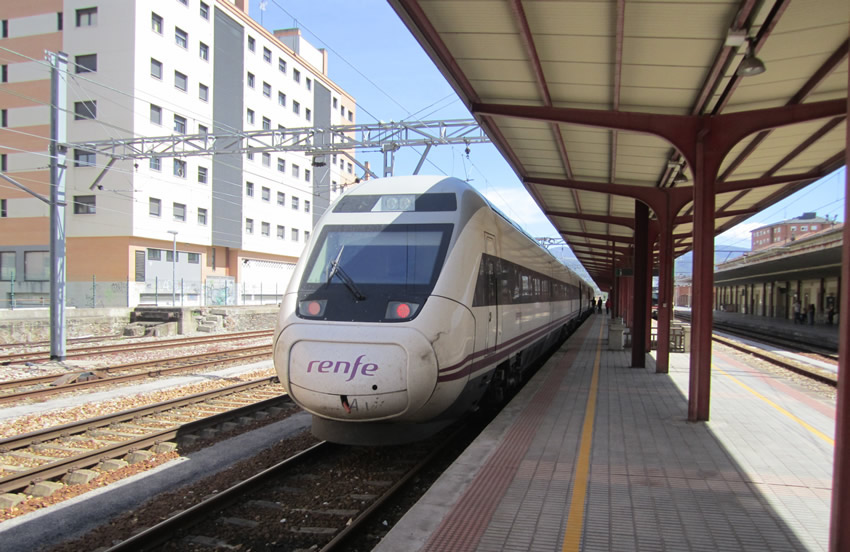

General information
- Coordinates: 42.5454°N 6.6023°W
- Owner: Adif
- Operator: Renfe
- Line: León–A Coruña railway

Construction
- Accessible: yes

Other information
- Station code: 20200

Passengers
- 2018: 122,332 ( )
Location

Ponferrada railway station is the railway station of the Spanish city of Ponferrada.

== History ==
The station was opened in 1882, with the opening of Brañuelas - Ponferrada section in Palencia - A Coruña railway.

== Services ==
Ponferrada station is a compulsory stop for all the passenger trains of the line That circumstance allows to have direct connections with the most important cities of the North of the country, besides other places like Zaragoza or Barcelona. Alvia services are operated to A Coruña, Vigo-Guixar, Barcelona Sants and Madrid-Chamartín. The Regional Express service goes to León and Vigo-Guixar, and also links with towns as Monforte de Lemos or Astorga.

Preceding station	Renfe Operadora	Following station
San Miguel de las Dueñas towards Madrid Chamartín	Alvia	Terminus
Bembibre towards Barcelona Sants	Alvia	O Barco de Valdeorras towards A Coruña
Bembibre towards Barcelona Sants	Alvia	O Barco de Valdeorras towards Vigo-Guixar
Bembibre towards Hendaye	Intercity	O Barco de Valdeorras towards A Coruña
Bembibre towards Bilbao-Abando	Intercity	O Barco de Valdeorras towards Vigo-Guixar
San Miguel de las Dueñas towards León	Media Distancia 6	Villadepalos towards Vigo-Guixar
San Miguel de las Dueñas towards León	Media Distancia 29	Terminus
