= Medina del Campo railway station =

Railway station in Spain

Medina del Campo
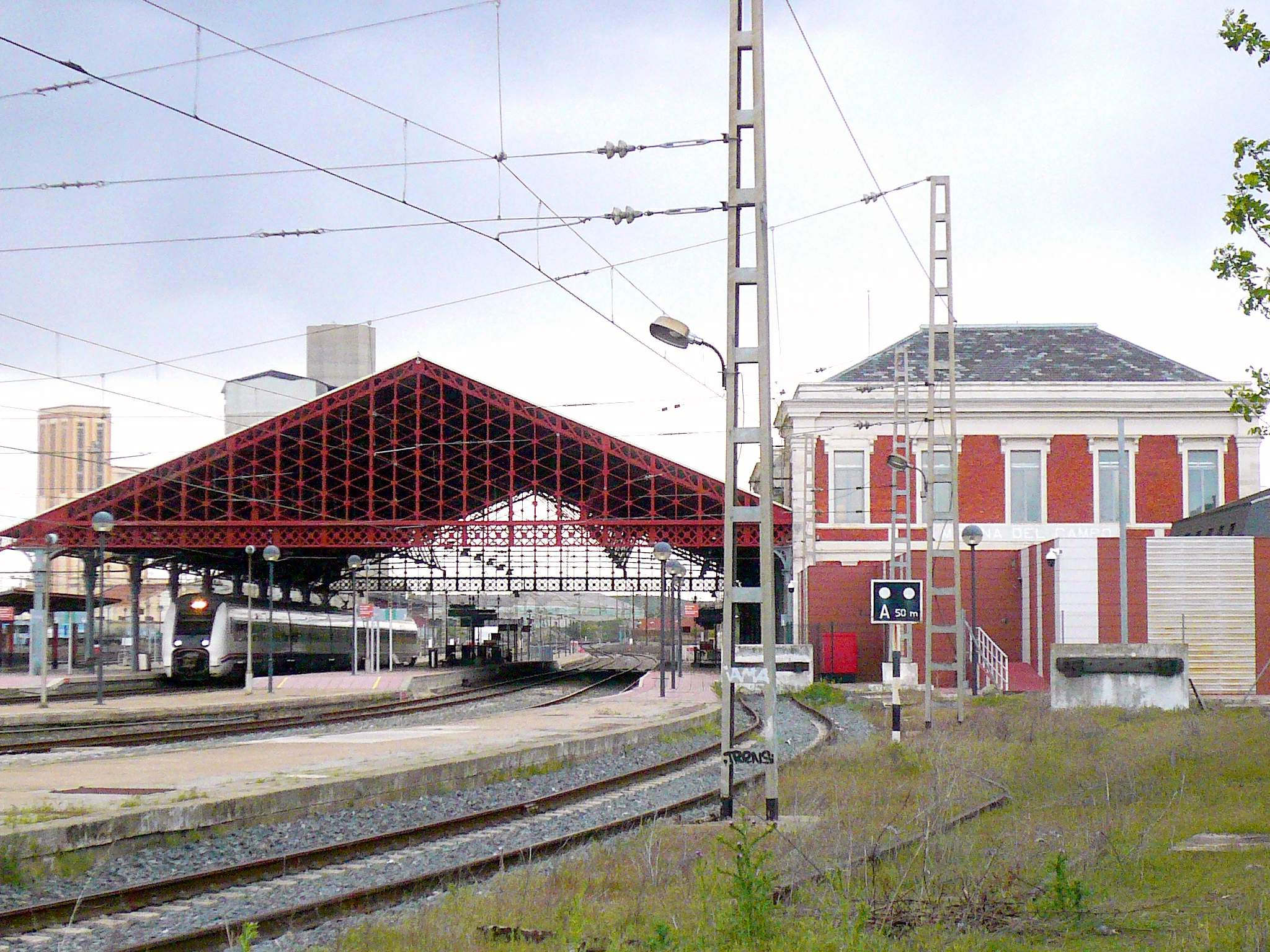

General information
- Location: Avenida Estación Ferrocarril 27, Medina del Campo, Valladolid, 47400
- Coordinates: 41.3172763°N 4.9096181°W
- Owner: Adif
- Operator: Renfe
- Platforms: 4
- Tracks: 7

Other information
- Station code: 10500

History
- Opened: 3 September 1860; 165 years ago
Location

The Medina del Campo railway station is a railway station serving the Spanish city of Medina del Campo, in the province of Valladolid.

== History ==
The original station opened in 1860. The first train from Valladolid opening the Valladolid–Medina stretch of the Madrid–Hendaye railway arrived on 3 September 1860, an event for which the locals had been summoned by means of a municipal ordinance dated from 29 August. It was expanded and a new building was inaugurated in 1902, under a 1896 project devised by Vicente Sala. The new station building, which followed the French-style used by the Compañía del Norte, was built just in front of the old station.

== Bibliography ==
Bibliography

- Sendino González, Ricardo (1986). "El ferrocarril en Medina del Campo". Historia de Medina del Campo y su tierra. Las tres riquezas: agricultura, industria y cultura (PDF). Vol. 3. Ayuntamiento de Medina del Campo. Consejería de Educación y Cultura de la Junta de Castilla y León. Excma. Diputación Provincial de Valladolid. Caja de Ahorros Provincial de Valladolid. ISBN 84-505-4414-9.
- Manterola Armisén, Javier (2011). "La construcción y los materiales metálicos". In Silva Suárez, Manuel (ed.). El ochocientos. De los lenguajes al patrimonio. Técnica e ingeniería en España. Vol. VI. Real Academia de Ingeniería; Institución Fernando el Católico; Prensas Universitarias de Zaragoza. ISBN 978-84-9911-151-3.
