= Vitoria-Gasteiz railway station =

Vitoria-Gasteiz
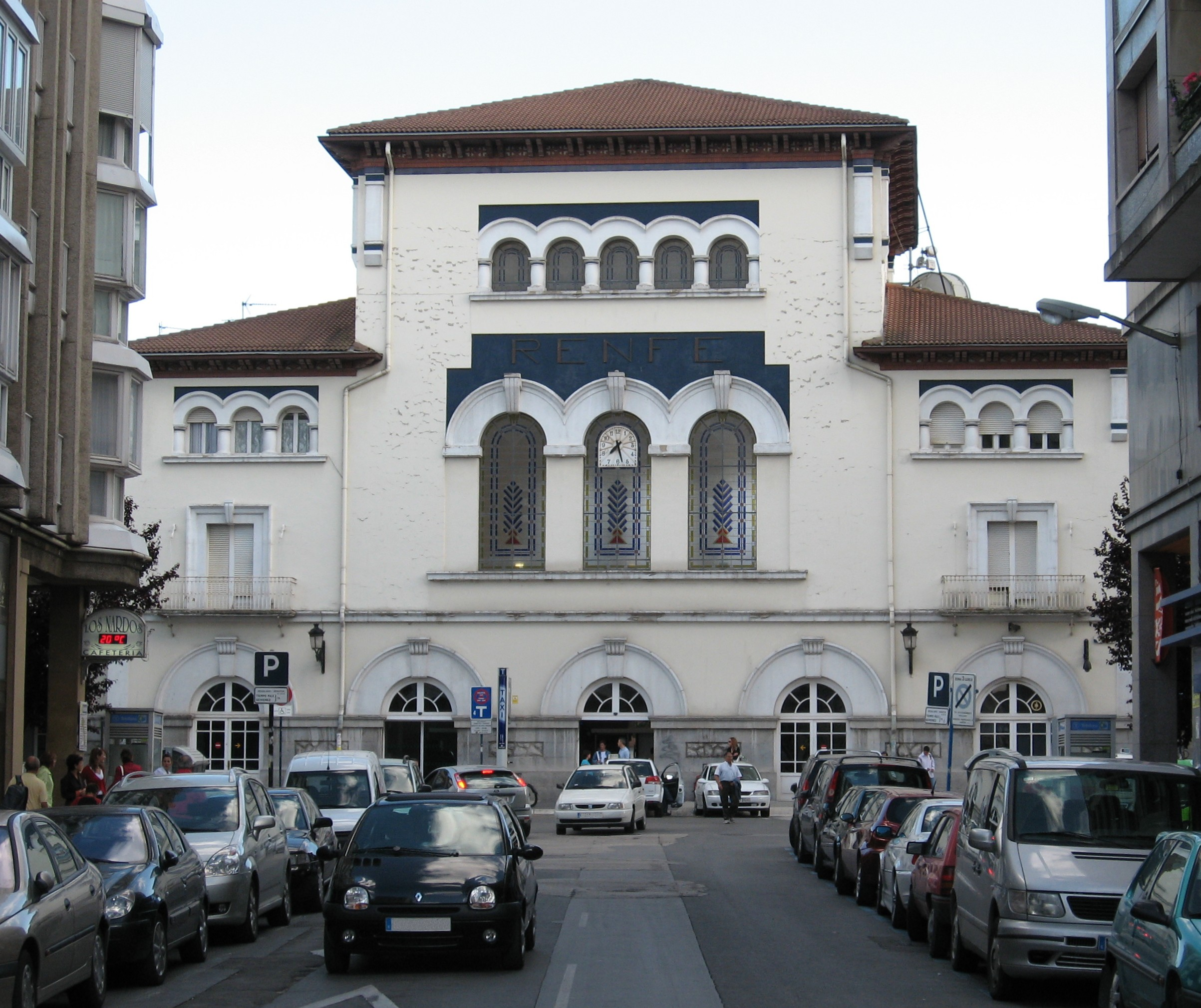
- Station façade

General information
- Owner: Adif
- Operator: Renfe
- Line: Madrid–Hendaye
- Platforms: 2

Passengers
- 2018: 546,767
Location

Vitoria-Gasteiz railway station is the main railway station in the Basque capital city of Vitoria-Gasteiz in Spain.

== Services ==
Vitoria-Gasteiz railway station is one of the main stops on the Madrid–Hendaye railway. Half a dozen trains each day link the city with Madrid, using Alvia trains on the AVE infrastructure to reach Madrid in 3 hours 43 minutes. There are also connections to Paris, Barcelona, Lisbon and Bordeaux. There is a complete lack of rail services to Andalusia and no direct rail link with Bilbao.

Preceding station	Renfe Operadora	Following station
Miranda de Ebro towards Madrid Chamartín	Alvia	Alsasua towards Hendaye
Miranda de Ebro towards A Coruña	Alvia	Pamplona towards Barcelona Sants
Miranda de Ebro towards Vigo-Guixar	Alvia	Pamplona towards Barcelona Sants
Miranda de Ebro towards Gijón	Alvia	Pamplona towards Barcelona Sants
Miranda de Ebro towards Santa Apolónia	Trenhotel Surexpreso	San Sebastián towards Hendaye
Miranda de Ebro towards A Coruña	Intercity	Alsasua towards Hendaye
Miranda de Ebro towards Madrid Chamartín	Intercity	Alegría de Álava towards Irun
Miranda de Ebro towards Madrid Chamartín	Intercity	Terminus
Terminus	Intercity	Pamplona towards Barcelona Sants
Nanclares-Langraiz towards Valladolid-Campo Grande	Media Distancia 21	Terminus
Nanclares-Langraiz towards Miranda de Ebro	Media Distancia 25	Alegría de Álava towards Irun
Terminus	Media Distancia 26	Alegría-Dulantzi towards Zaragoza-Delicias

== Future ==
The Basque Y high-speed rail network is planned to connect Vitoria-Gasteiz with the French border, San Sebastián and Bilbao within 35 minutes. However, work on this project has been slow and there is no date for its inaugural run. As part of these works, Vitoria-Gasteiz station will be rebuilt underground.
