= Alvia =

High-speed rail service in Spain

Alvia is a high-speed train service in Spain offered by Renfe on long-distance routes with a top speed of 250 km/h (160 mph). The trains have the ability to use both Iberian gauge and standard gauge, which allows them to travel on the recently constructed high-speed lines for part of the journey before switching to the "classic" Iberian gauge network to complete it. Trains that run exclusively on high-speed tracks are branded AVE or Avant.

== Trains and Routes ==
Mixed-high speed services via conventional lines in Spain. Sections over High-speed railway lines in blue, sections over conventional line (in Iberian gauge) in red).

As of February 2025, RENFE Class 120, RENFE Class 130 and RENFE Class 730 trains are in service.

Class 120 trains are used on the routes from Madrid to Pamplona, Logroño, Bilbao, Irún and Hendaye (France) (running on high-speed lines from Madrid to Burgos and changing gauge there), from Madrid to Huelva changing gauge at Seville, from Madrid to Santander changing gauge at Venta de Baños from Madrid to Salamanca changing gauge at Medina del Campo and between Barcelona and San Sebastián, Bilbao (running on high-speed lines between Barcelona and Zaragoza).

Class 130 trains are used on the routes from Madrid to Cádiz, from Madrid to Avilés changing gauge at León, and from Alicante to Gijón and Santander changing gauge at León and Venta de Baños respectively, and between Barcelona and Salamanca/Galicia.

Finally, Class 730 are used on the routes from Madrid Chamartín to A Coruña, Ferrol, Vigo, Lugo and Badajoz as well as from Madrid Atocha to Almeria and Algeciras. These trains also used to operate the routes from Madrid to Murcia and further to Cartagena, before those are replaced by AVE Madrid–Murcia services on a new high-speed line. Unlike the other classes, these can run on diesel as well as overhead electric power and so are used on those routes where lines are not electrified.

== Operational services ==
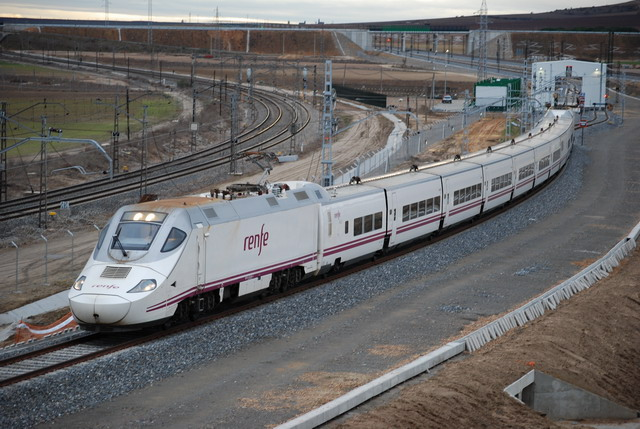
Alvia Madrid-Hendaye (RENFE Class 130) at Valdestillas, Valladolid.

As of 2024 Renfe offers the following Alvia services:

- Alicante–Santander, via Villena, Albacete, Cuenca, Madrid, Segovia, Valladolid, Palencia and Torrelavega.
- Barcelona–A Coruña, via Camp Tarragona, Lleida, Zaragoza, Tudela, Castejon, Tafalla, Pamplona, Vitoria-Gasteiz, Miranda de Ebro, Burgos, Palencia, Sahagun, León, Astorga, Bembibre, Ponferrada, O Barco de Valdeorras, A Rúa, San Clodio-Quiroga, Monforte de Lemos, Ourense and Santiago de Compostela.
- Barcelona–Bilbao, via Camp Tarragona, Lleida, Zaragoza, Tudela, Castejon, Calahorra, Logroño, Haro and Miranda De Ebro.
- Barcelona–San Sebastián, via Camp Tarragona, Lleida, Zaragoza, Tudela, Castejon, Tafalla, Pamplona, Altsasu and Zumarraga.
- Barcelona–Salamanca, via Camp Tarragona, Lleida, Zaragoza, Tudela, Castejon, Tafalla, Pamplona, Vitoria-Gasteiz, Miranda de Ebro, Burgos, Valladolid and Medina del Campo.
- Barcelona–Vigo, via Lleida, Zaragoza, Pamplona, Vitoria-Gasteiz, Burgos, León, Ponferrada, Ourense and Guillarei, with connection services to Gijón in León and to A Coruña in Monforte de Lemos.
- Gijón–Alicante, via Oviedo, Mieres Del Camín, La Pola, León, Palencia, Valladolid, Segovia, Madrid, Cuenca, Albacete and Villena.
- Madrid–Algeciras via Ciudad Real, Puertollano, Córdoba, Antequera, Ronda and San Roque-la Línea.
- Madrid–Almeria, via Córdoba, Antequera, Granada and Guadix.
- Madrid–Avilés, via Palencia, León, Mieres Del Camín and Oviedo.
- Madrid–Badajoz, via Leganés, Torrijos, Talavera De La Reina, Oropesa de Toledo, Navalmoral De La Mata, Monfragüe-plasencia, Cáceres and Mérida.
- Madrid–Bilbao, via Segovia, Valladolid, Burgos and Miranda de Ebro. Also called colloquially as Alvia ‘Miguel de Unamuno’ or Alvia ‘Río Nervión’. On matchdays played by the team Athletic Bilbao at San Mamés stadium, which connects to the station of arrival, it’s called ‘Alvia Athletic’. The nickname 'Miguel de Unamuno' is alluded to another Estrella/Diurno (Renfe) service with the same nickname, but the Estrella/Diurno service disappeared and the nickname of the poet 'Miguel de Unamuno' is used on the actual service.
- Madrid–Badajoz, via Leganés, Torrijos, Talavera De La Reina, Oropesa, Navalmoral De La Mata, Monfragüe-plasencia, Cáceres and Mérida.
- Madrid–Cádiz, via Ciudad Real, Puertollano, Córdoba, Sevilla and Jerez de la Frontera.
- Madrid–Ferrol, via Segovia, Medina del Campo, Zamora, Sanabria, A Gudiña, Ourense, Santiago de Compostela, A Coruña, Betanzos and Pontedeume.
- Madrid–Huelva, via Cordoba and La Palma Del Condado.
- Madrid–Irun, via Segovia, Valladolid, Burgos, Miranda de Ebro, Vitoria-Gasteiz, Zumarraga, Tolosa and San Sebastián. Also called Alvia Pio Baroja (in allusion to another service (Estrella) with the same nickname) or Alvia Concha.
- Madrid–Logroño, via Guadalajara, Calatayud, Tudela and Calahorra
- Madrid–Lugo, via Segovia, Medina del Campo, Zamora, Sanabria, A Gudiña, Ourense, Monforte De Lemos and Sarria.
- Madrid–Pamplona, via Guadalajara, Calatayud, Tudela and Tafalla.
- Madrid–Salamanca, via Segovia and Medina del Campo.
- Madrid–Santander, via Valladolid, Palencia, Aguilar De Campoo, Reinosa and Torrelavega.
- Madrid–Vigo, via Segovia and Medina del Campo, Zamora, Sanabria, A Gudiña, Ourense, Vilagarcia De Arousa and Pontevedra (trains with selective stops are also scheduled).

== Crashes ==
On 24 July 2013, the train driver of an Alvia 730 train traveling from Madrid to Ferrol, Galicia, took a curve well above the posted speed limit and the train derailed near Santiago de Compostela, killing 79 people and injuring more than 140.

On 18 January 2026 an Alvia train crashed into a derailed train in Adamuz, killing 46 people.
