= Pontevedra-Universidad railway station =

Railway stop in Pontevedra, Spain

Pontevedra-Universidad
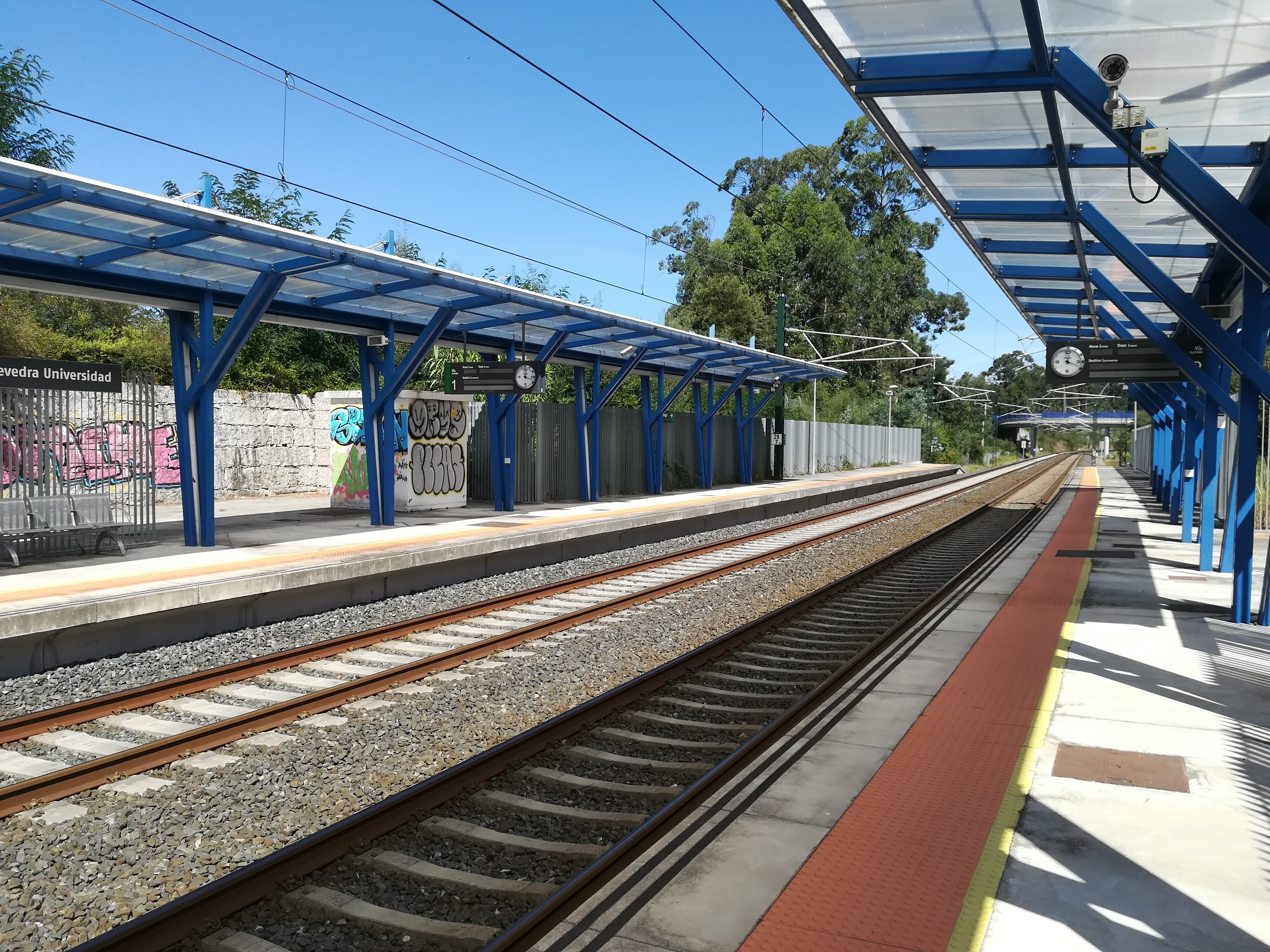

General information
- Location: Buenos Aires Avenue; Pontevedra; 36162- Pontevedra; Spain
- Coordinates: 42.4349°N 8.6303°W
- System: stop
- Owner: adif
- Lines: Atlantic Axis high-speed rail line Redondela-Santiago de Compostela
- Platforms: 2
- Tracks: 2

Construction
- Structure type: At-grade
- Accessible: yes

Other information
- Station code: 23018

History
- Opened: 2001
Location

Pontevedra-University is a suburban railway stop on the Redondela-Santiago de Compostela line. It is located in the municipality of Pontevedra, to the north of the city, in the autonomous community of Galicia in Spain.

Opened in 2001, it is served by Media Distancia Renfe. It serves the university campus.

== Railway location ==
At an altitude of 17 metres, the Pontevedra-Universidad railway stop is located at kilometre point (KP) 19.9 of the Redondela-Santiago de Compostela Iberian-gauge line, between the railway stations of Pontevedra and Portela.

== History ==
In November 1998, specific dates began to be discussed for the construction of a railway stop near the Pontevedra campus. The works for the railway stop to the campus were awarded in July 1999.

The Pontevedra-Universidad stop was finally put into service by Renfe in October 2001 to serve the Pontevedra campus.

Since 31 December 2004, ADIF has been the operator of the railway stop. In June 2021, ADIF decided to improve the access ramps to the stop and the lighting.

== Traveller services ==
=== Description ===
The railway stop has two platforms with video surveillance, shelters and electronic information boards indicating train arrivals and departures, a device for emergency calls and a clock.

=== Services ===
Pontevedra-Universidad is served by trains of the Media Distancia Renfe service, mainly originating or terminating at the railway stations of A Coruña, Pontevedra, Santiago de Compostela and Vigo-Guixar.

Line	Route	Cities and towns served
Regional	A Coruña - Vigo Guixar	A Coruña - Uxes - Cerceda-Meirama - Ordes - Santiago de Compostela - Padrón - Pontecesures - Catoira - Vilagarcía de Arousa - Pontevedra-Universidad - Pontevedra - Arcade - Redondela-Picota - Redondela - Vigo-Guixar

=== Intermodal passenger transport ===
Buses serve the train stop and the university campus.

== Gallery ==
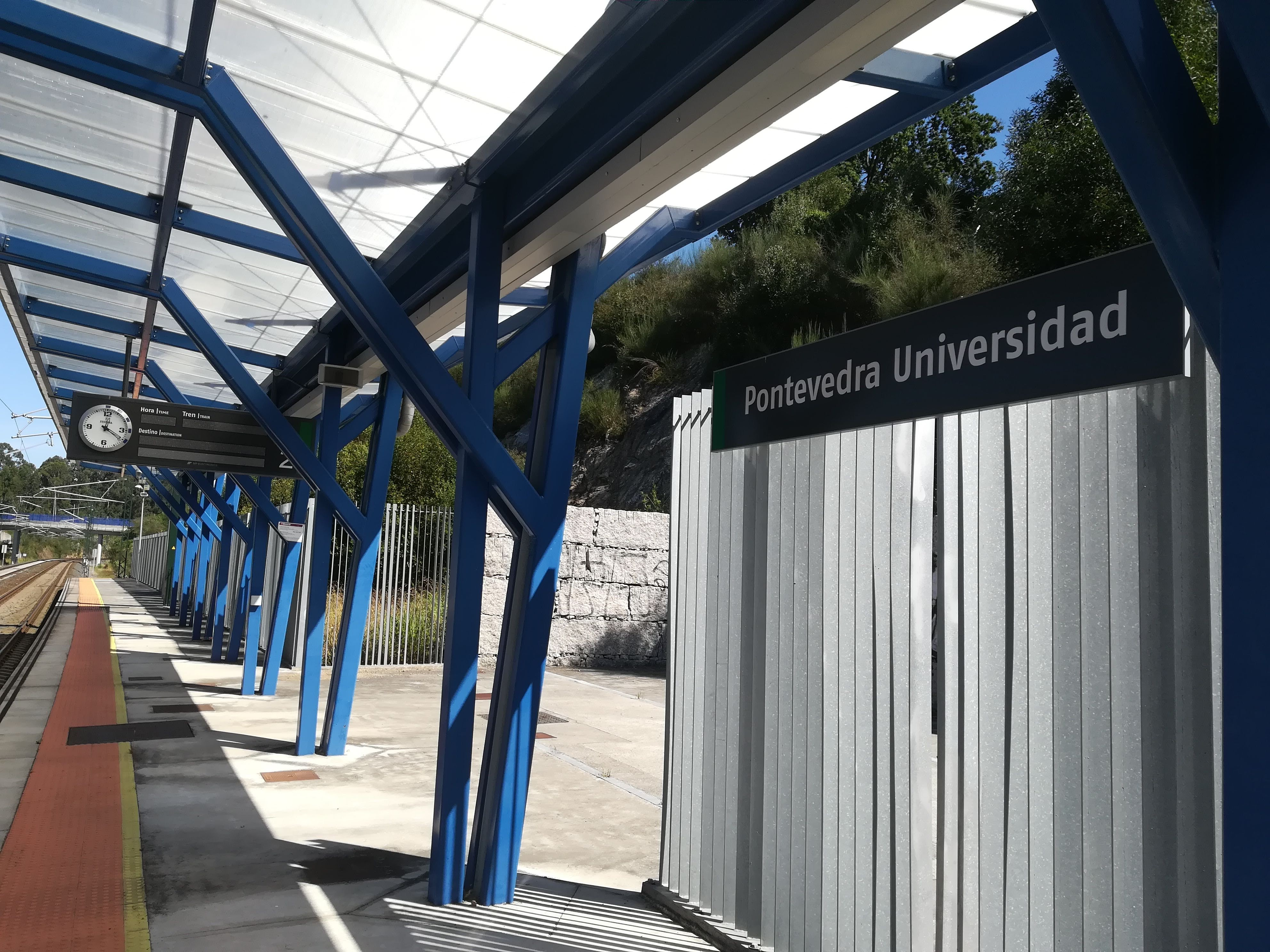
Pontevedra station running in board, clock and platform display

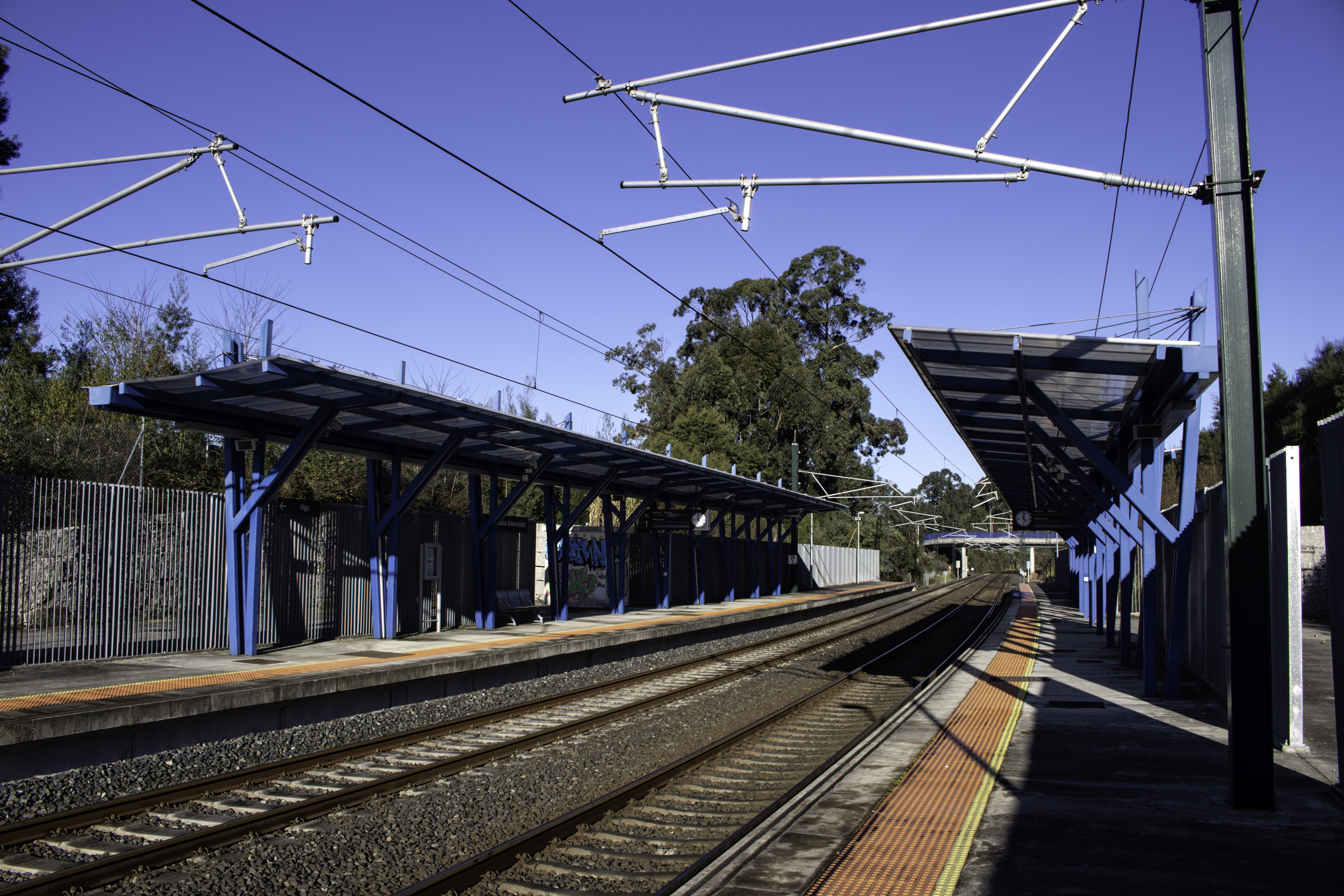
Pontevedra-Universidad railway station platforms

== See also ==
=== Related articles ===
- Pontevedra railway station
- Administrador de infraestructuras ferroviarias

=== External links ===
- Media Distancia Galice on the website Renfe.
- Pontevedra-Universidad stop on the Adif official website.
