= León–A Coruña railway =

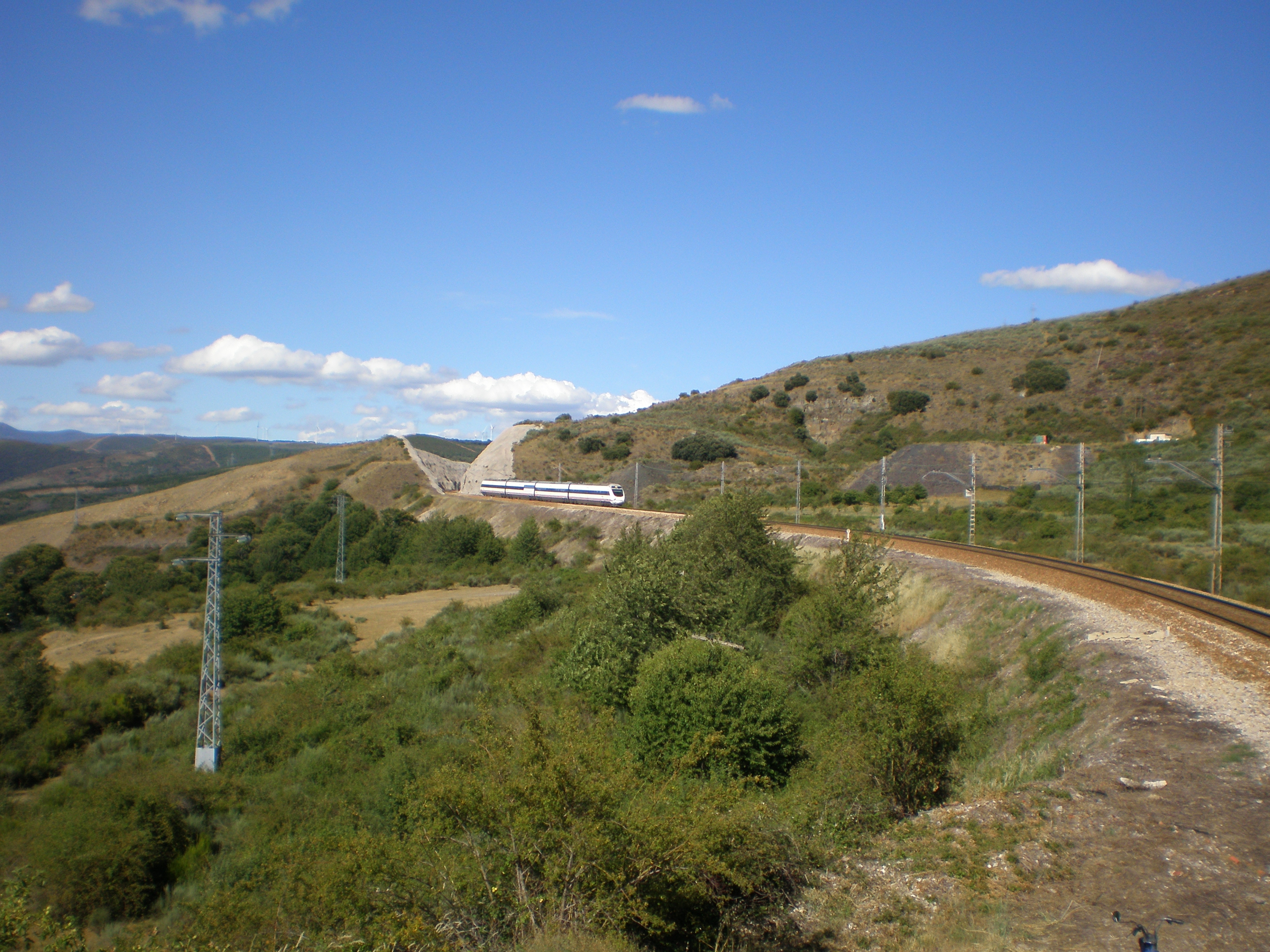
- The León–A Coruña railway between Brañuelas and La Granja

Overview
- Status: Operational
- Owner: Adif
- Termini: León; A Coruña

Service
- Operator(s): Renfe Operadora

History
- Opened: 13 August 1883

Technical
- Line length: 428.2 km (266.1 mi)
- Track gauge: 1,668 mm (5 ft 5 21/32 in) Iberian gauge

The León–A Coruña railway is an Iberian-gauge railway in Spain, providing the main route from Madrid to Galicia. The Adif designation for the line is Line 800.

== Route ==
The line runs through the provinces of León, Ourense, Lugo and A Coruña. Important towns served include Monforte de Lemos, Lugo and Ponferrada.

== Services ==
There is no through service operating on the line in its entirety; with A Coruña to León direct trains being routed via Santiago de Compostela. However, Media Distancia services run from A Coruña to Monforte de Lemos, where Alvia trains use the second stretch of the line to León. Regional Express services call at smaller stations on various stretches of the line.
