= Madrid–Galicia high-speed rail line =

Spanish high-speed railway line

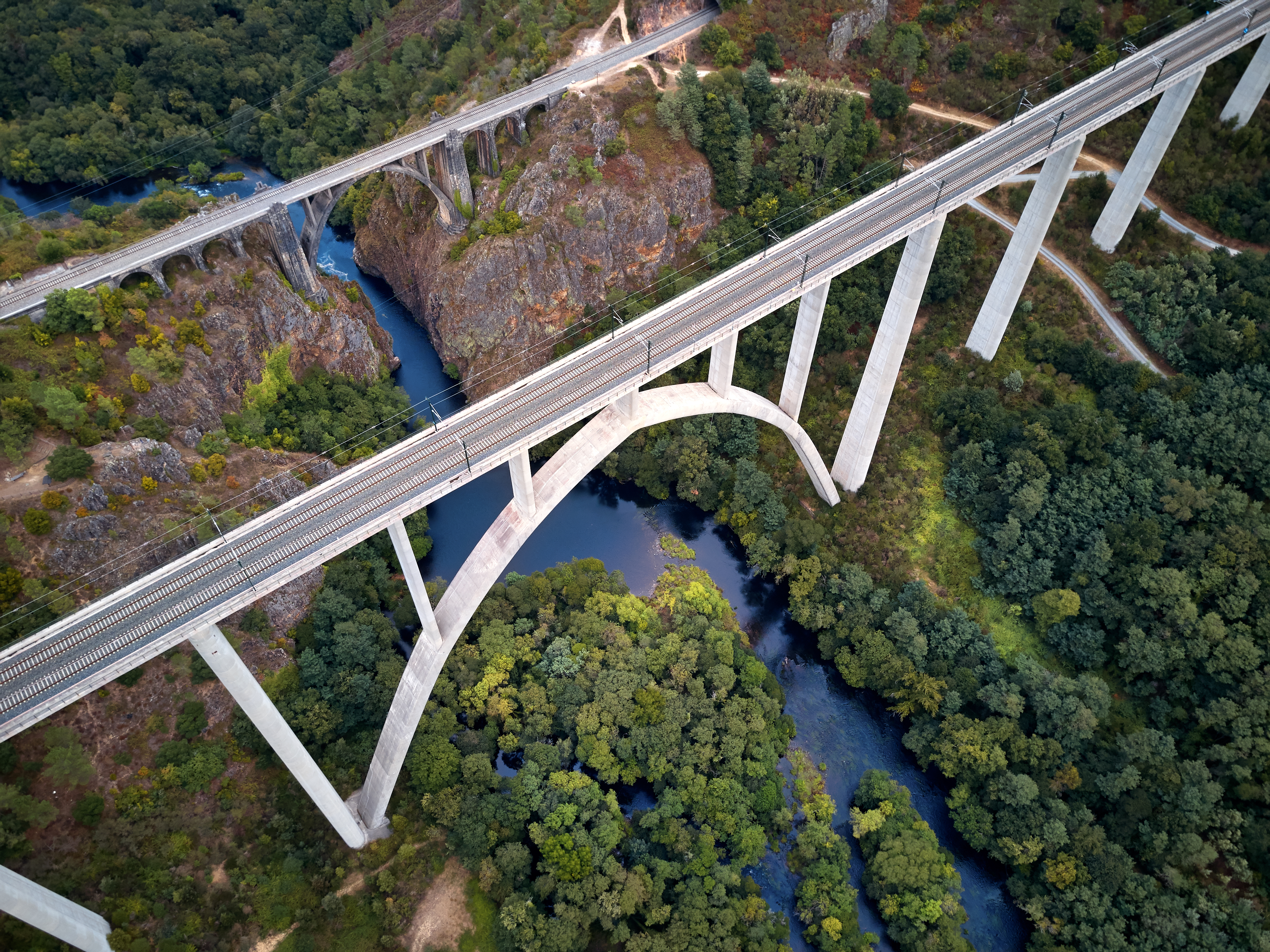
- Viaduct over the Ulla river, with the old bridge in the background, now used by regional services.

Overview
- Status: in operation
- Owner: Adif
- Locale: Spain
- Termini: Madrid Chamartín; Santiago de Compostela

Service
- Type: High-speed rail
- Operator(s): Renfe Operadora

Technical
- Line length: 415.7 km (258.3 mi)
- Number of tracks: Double track
- Track gauge: 1,435 mm (4 ft 8 1/2 in) standard gauge
- Electrification: 25 kV 50 Hz
- Operating speed: 300 km/h (190 mph)

The Madrid–Galicia high-speed rail line is a high-speed railway line in Spain that links the city of Madrid with the region of Galicia via the cities of Olmedo, Zamora, Ourense and Santiago de Compostela. The line also connects the Atlantic Axis high-speed rail line to the rest of the Spanish AVE high-speed network. The Madrid–Galicia high-speed rail line is constructed as double electrified line and is designed for trains running at speeds up to 350 kilometres per hour (220 mph).

== History ==
The line shares the same railway for the section between Madrid and Olmedo with the Madrid–Asturias high-speed rail line. This part was inaugurated on 23 December 2007 along with the entire section Madrid–Segovia–Valladolid. Construction on the section between Ourense and Santiago de Compostela started in 2004 and the 87.1 km (54.1 mi) part was completed and connected with the Atlantic Axis high-speed rail line in Santiago de Compostela on 10 December 2011. This part of the line has a track gauge of 1,668 mm (5 ft 5 21/32 in) Iberian gauge, which as of 2026 is due to be converted to 1,435 mm (4 ft 8 1/2 in) standard gauge. Since November 2015, trains in Alvia commercial service used this part on routes between Galicia and other Spanish regions.

In July 2015 it was announced that the traction power supply for the Olmedo-Pedralba de la Pradería (near Puebla de Sanabria) section would be switched-on on 7 August 2015. The 99 km (62 mi) southern section, between Olmedo (130 km (81 mi) north of Madrid on the Madrid–Leon line) and Zamora entered revenue service on 17 December 2015 and initially served by Alvia trains. In January 2017 it was announced that the boring of the Bolaños tunnels along the Verín - Ourense section of the line was completed. The central part, which crosses some of Spain's most remote and fragile natural areas, was initially expected to open in 2018, but has again been delayed to end 2021. The 110 km (68 mi) new built section between Zamora and Otero de Sanabria (near Puebla de Sanabria) was completed at a cost of 898 million euros and put in service on 26 October 2020. It is capable for speeds up to 350 km/h (217 mph). The Sanabria AV high-speed rail station opened on 22 July 2021. The 119.4 km (74.2 mi) last remaining part between Puebla de Sanabria and Ourense was completed on 21 December 2021 and the whole line was commercially inaugurated in AVE service on 21 December 2021, after 20 years of work.

In May 2024, AVE capacity was increased with the introduction of Talgo AVRIL trains, which added about 20% more seat capacity and can run at higher speeds. The new trains suffered from technical problems during the initial months of service, resulting in rolling stock substitutions and delays.

== Operations ==
There are 10 services each day in both directions. AVE trains initially ran between Madrid and Ourense with a maximum operating speed of 300 km/h (186 mph) to cover the distance in 2h 15min. The daily AVE schedule between Alicante and Ourense via Madrid Chamartín was introduced on 13 September 2022 and covers the distance in 4h 56min. In May 2024, the variable gauge Talgo AVRIL trains started running with 330 km/h (205 mph) in service on schedules between Madrid and A Coruña and between Madrid and Vigo via Santiago de Compostela. In addition Alvia services in the line on class 130 and 730 gauge-changing trains with a commercial speed of 250 km/h (155 mph), connect Madrid to Vigo, Lugo and Ferrol and Barcelona to A Coruña and Vigo.

Since 5 November 2024, two Alvia Madrid-Vigo services bypassing Santiago de Compostela are replaced by AVE services on Talgo AVRIL trains, thus achieving for first time journey times between Madrid and Vigo below 4 hours at 3h 57min.

== Incidents ==
On July 24th 2013, a speeding train derailed on a non-LAV (conventional line) stretch near the Santiago de Compostela railway station, killing 79 people.
