= Pontevedra bus station =

Bus station in Pontevedra, Spain

Estación de Autobuses de Pontevedra
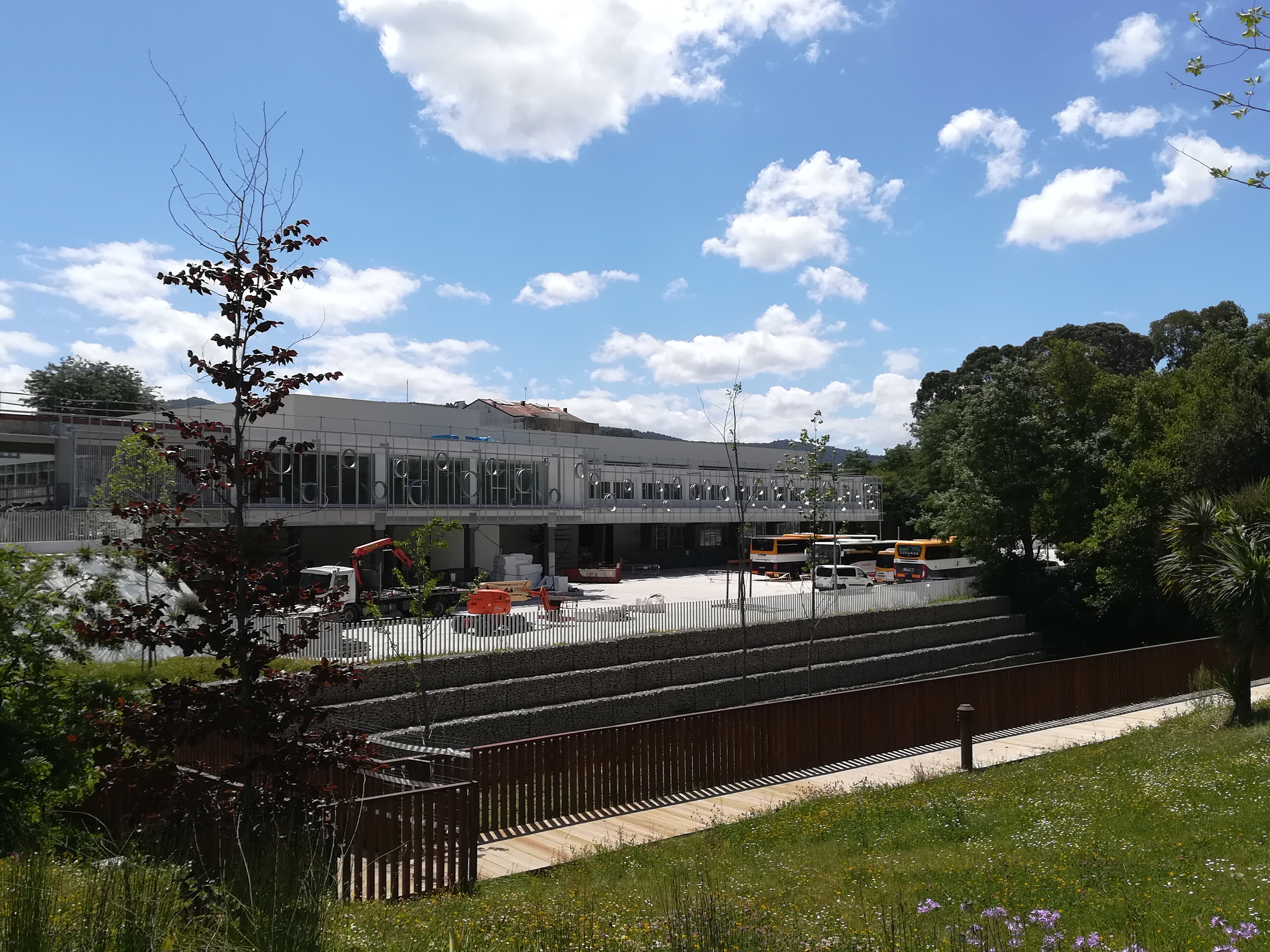
- Pontevedra bus station, west façade

General information
- Location: Estación Avenue, 10 Pontevedra; Galicia, Spain
- Coordinates: 42°25′15″N 8°38′14″W
- System: bus station
- Owner: Xunta de Galicia
- Platforms: 18

Construction
- Parking: yes
- Cycle facilities: yes

Other information

History
- Opened: 24 November 1980
- Rebuilt: 2020 - 2022
Location

The Pontevedra Bus Station (Estación de Autobuses de Pontevedra) is a bus station in Pontevedra (Spain) that allows inter-city bus traffic, with national or international destinations.

== Location ==
The Pontevedra bus station is located in the southern part of the city, on Estación Avenue, opposite the railway station, next to the Gafos river. It is 400 metres from the PO-10 ring road and close to the AP-9 motorway.

== History ==
Since the post-war years, in the 1940s, Pontevedra had been asking for a bus station to centralise the transport of passengers by coach, in accordance with its status as a provincial capital. After many negotiations in Madrid, Calixto González-Posada y Rodríguez was the first mayor of the city to announce the construction of the station. However, the Spanish government's commitment to its construction did not materialise, either in the 1940s or in the following decades.

In the absence of a bus station, buses arriving in Pontevedra stopped in several central streets such as Gutiérrez Mellado (formerly General Mola), Pastor Díaz, Benito Corbal, Sagasta, Cobián Roffignac, García Camba and the San José Square.

Finally, after the choice of its location was questioned due to its relative distance from the city centre, the Pontevedra bus station was built on a plot of land opposite the railway station, on its western side, close to the Gafos river. The engineer in charge of the work was Mr. Moreno de la Casa. Construction work began in December 1976 and lasted two years. The bus station was inaugurated by the Mayor of Pontevedra, Joaquín Queizán Taboada, on 4 December 1978. However, the station did not become operational until 24 November 1980, with two floors, escalators and several commercial establishments inside. In 2015, the escalators were removed and replaced by two lifts with a capacity of 13 people each.

On 13 January 2020, the Xunta de Galicia began the major renovation of the bus station, with a budget of 6 million euros. The facade, interior and information systems have been completely renovated and the original roof of the building has been recovered, promoting a bright interior. The platforms were also renovated, the tracks of the two road accesses on either side of the station's main façade were removed and a new road access was built on the southwest side towards Josefina Arruti Avenue. In addition, a pedestrian square was built in front of the station and a new pedestrian connection on the east side with the railway station to promote intermodal passenger transport and the area around the Gafos River was reclaimed and landscaped.

The new southern road access to the station became operational on 1 September 2021. The station refurbishment works were completed in November 2022.

== Description ==
The Pontevedra bus station building has two floors. The upper floor is accessible from the Estación Avenue square, via a wide ramp suitable for disabled people along the central part of the façade and stairs on the sides. This floor houses the entrance, a large central hall, a cafeteria, management and information offices, toilets, a large front information board and lifts. The ground floor provides access to the 18 boarding platforms, which are arranged in a diagonal parking pattern, and has an outdoor waiting area.

The facade consists of white cladding with micro-perforated steel sheeting, which gives it a unified appearance, and multiple windows. The roof, true to its original design, offers a lot of light thanks to multiple skylights. Inside, the spacious first floor entrance hall benefits from natural light and is dominated by wooden textures.

In front of the main entrance to the station there is a large paved pedestrian square with trees, on the south side of which there is a shelter marking a pedestrian route linking the bus station to the railway station. To the west of the square, there is a parking area and a kiss and ride lane for users arriving at the station by car or motorbike.

== Services ==
The bus station in Pontevedra is served by various bus networks. Pontevedra is connected by coach to most cities in Spain and Galicia, as well as abroad, including Porto airport and France.

== Gallery ==
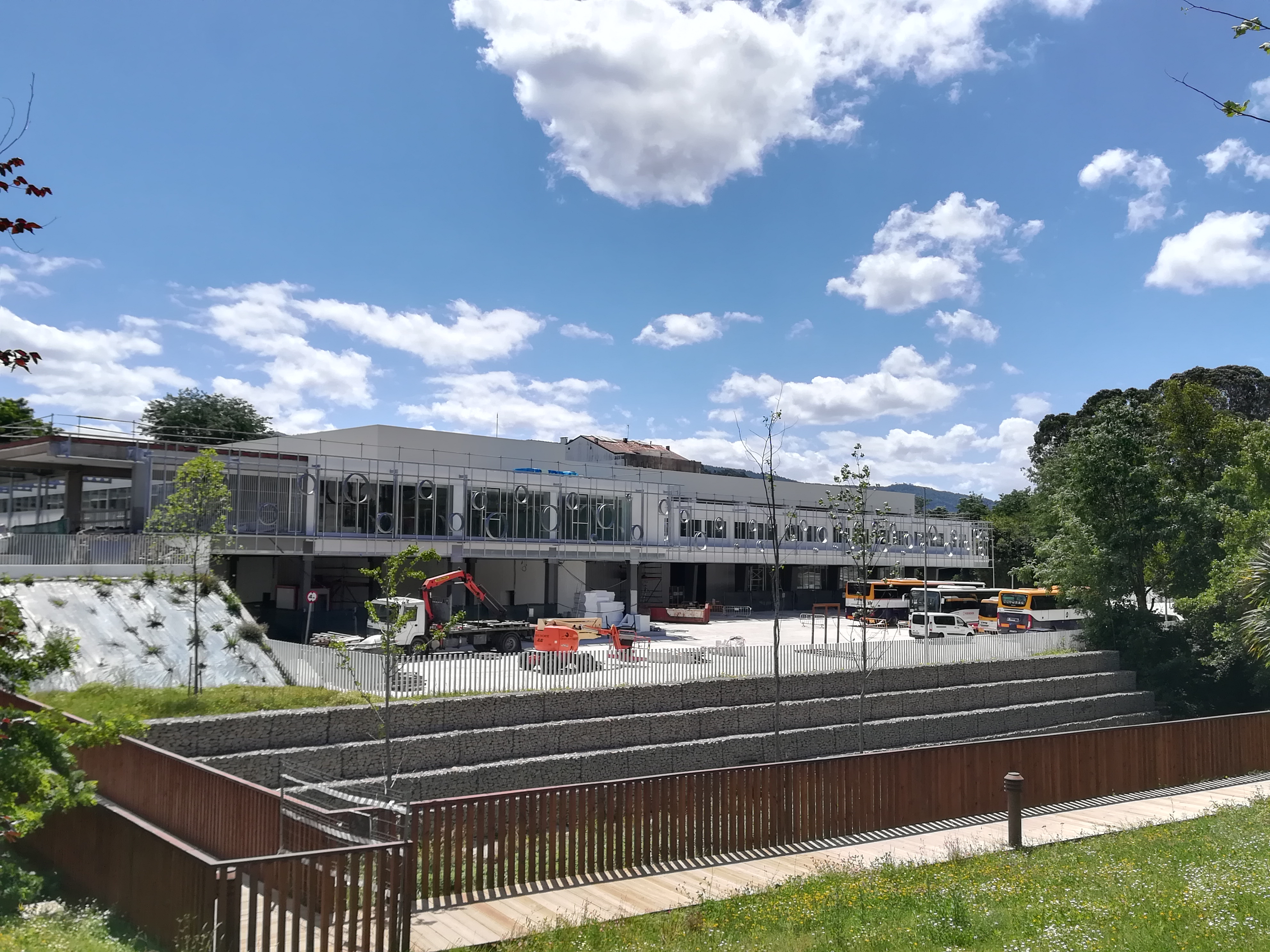
West side of the bus station

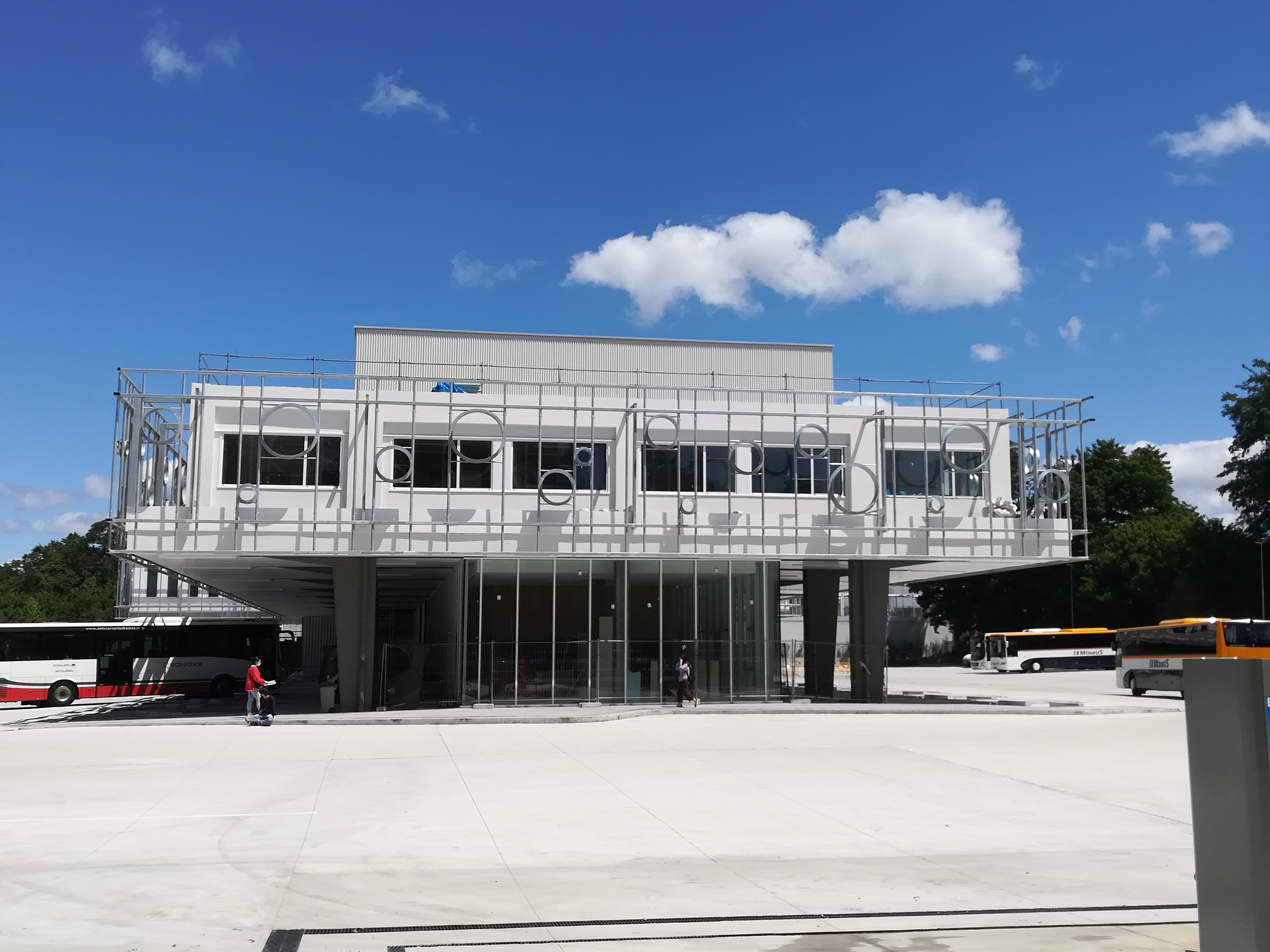
Rear facade of the station

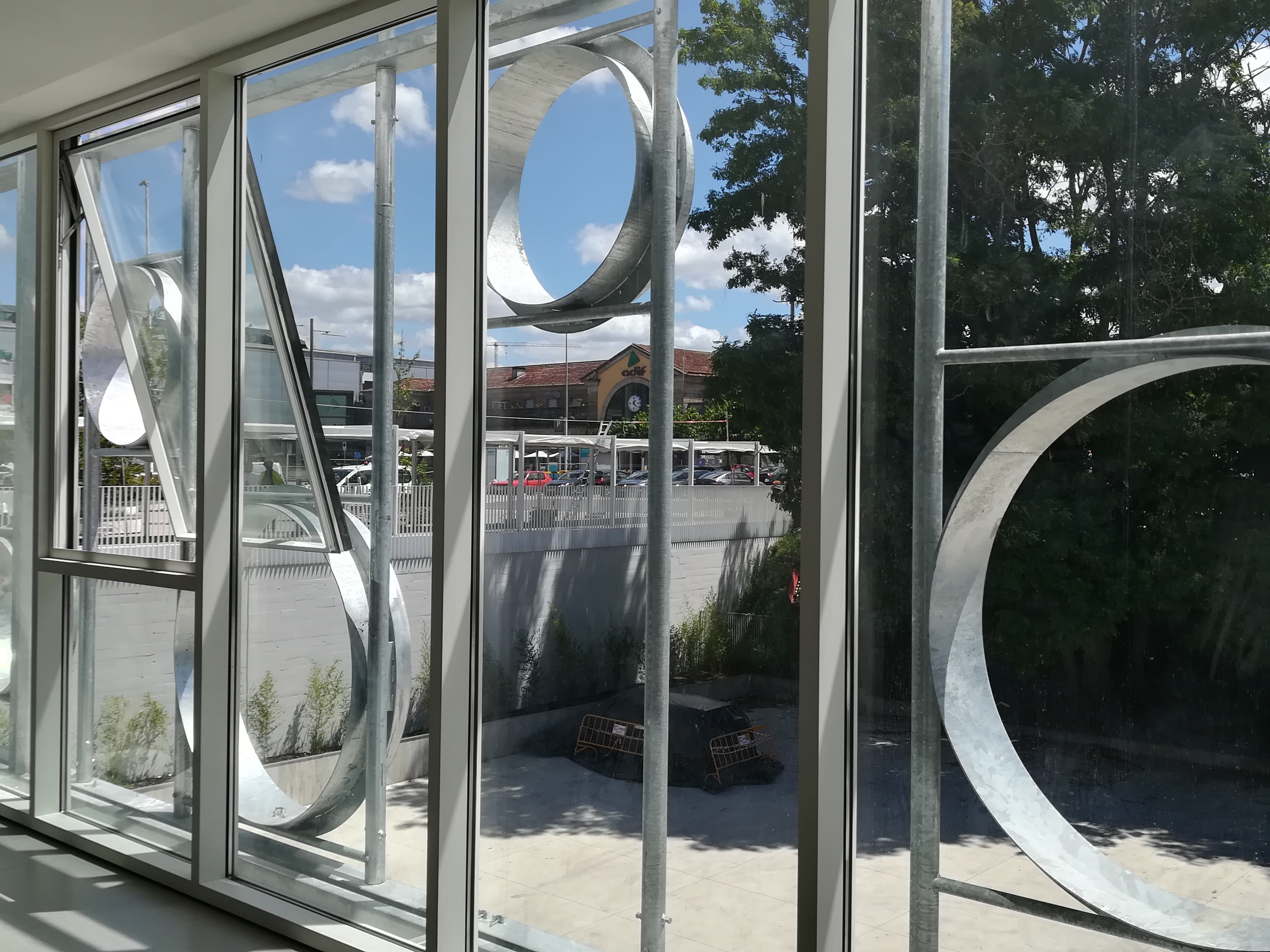
Windows of the bus station with view of the railway station

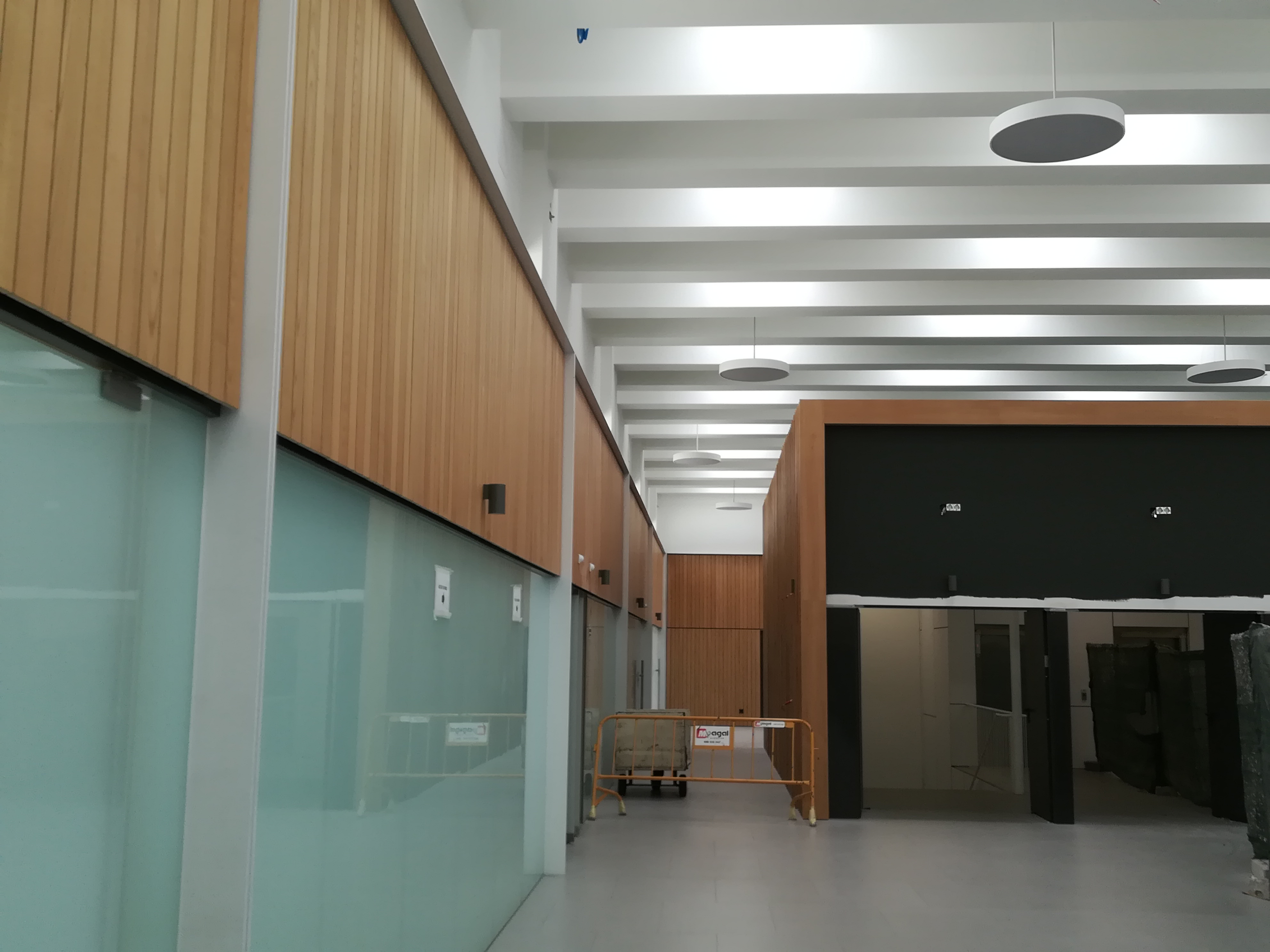
Interior of the bus station

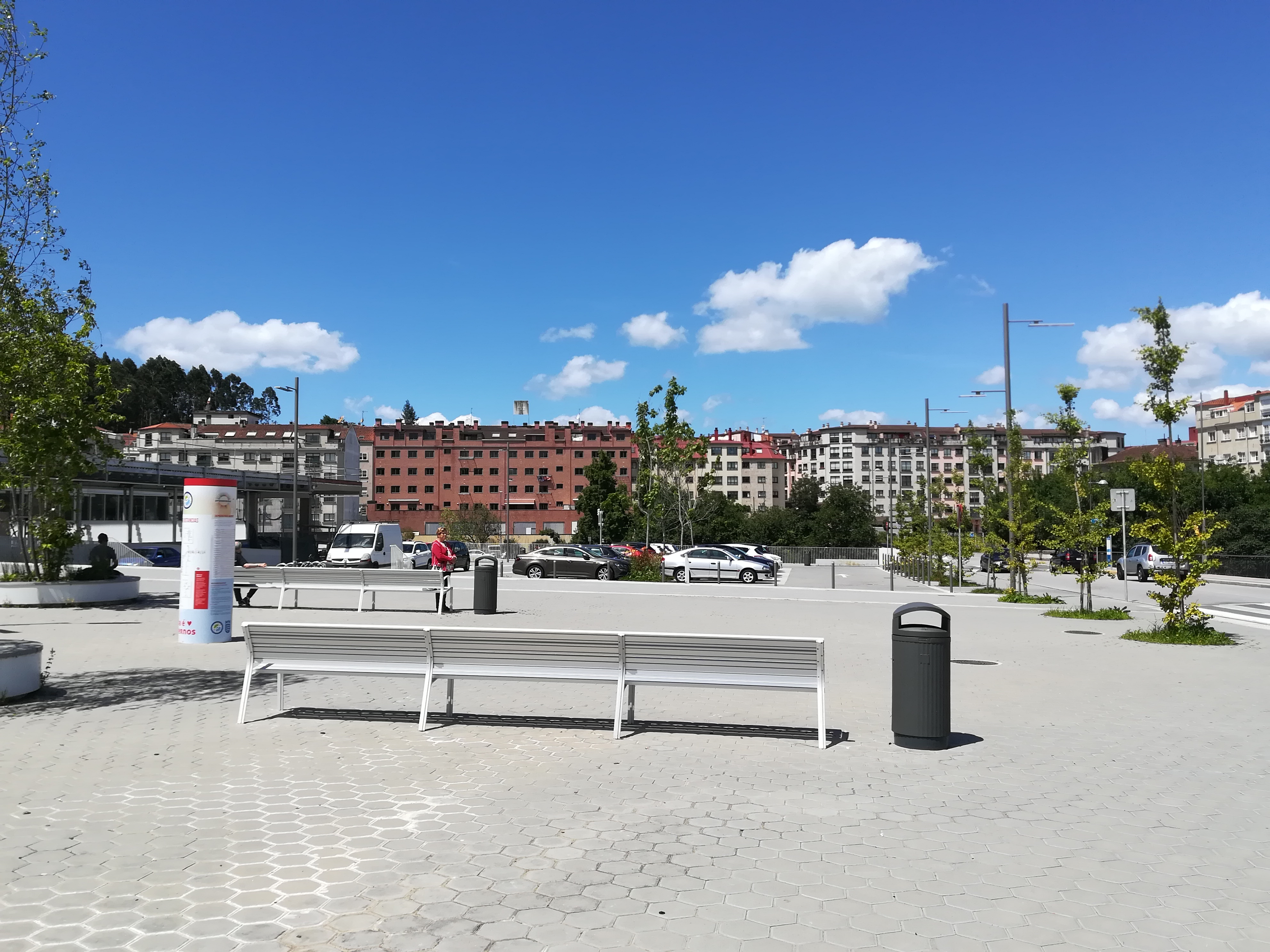
Bus station square

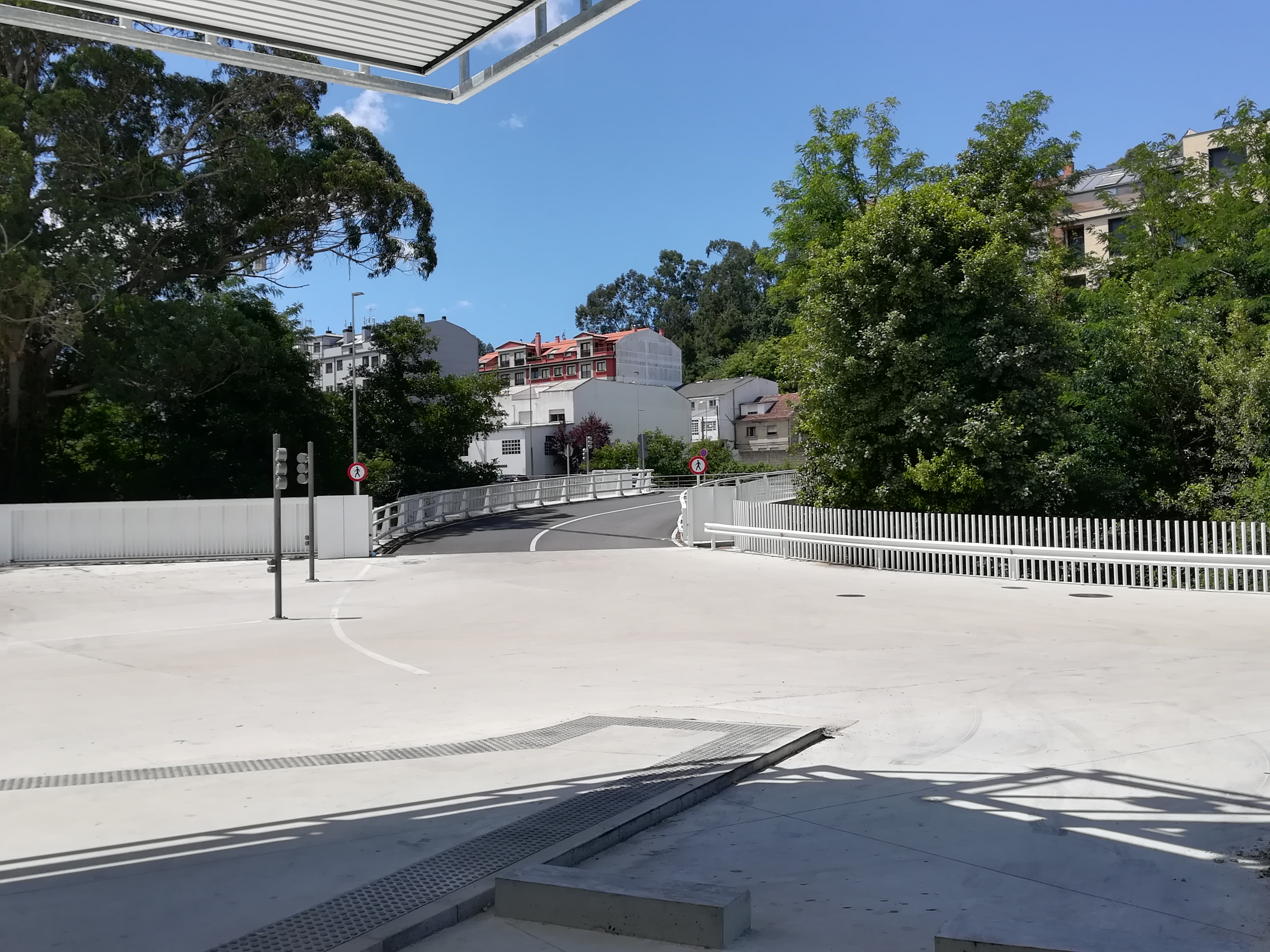
Exit and entrance lane for buses

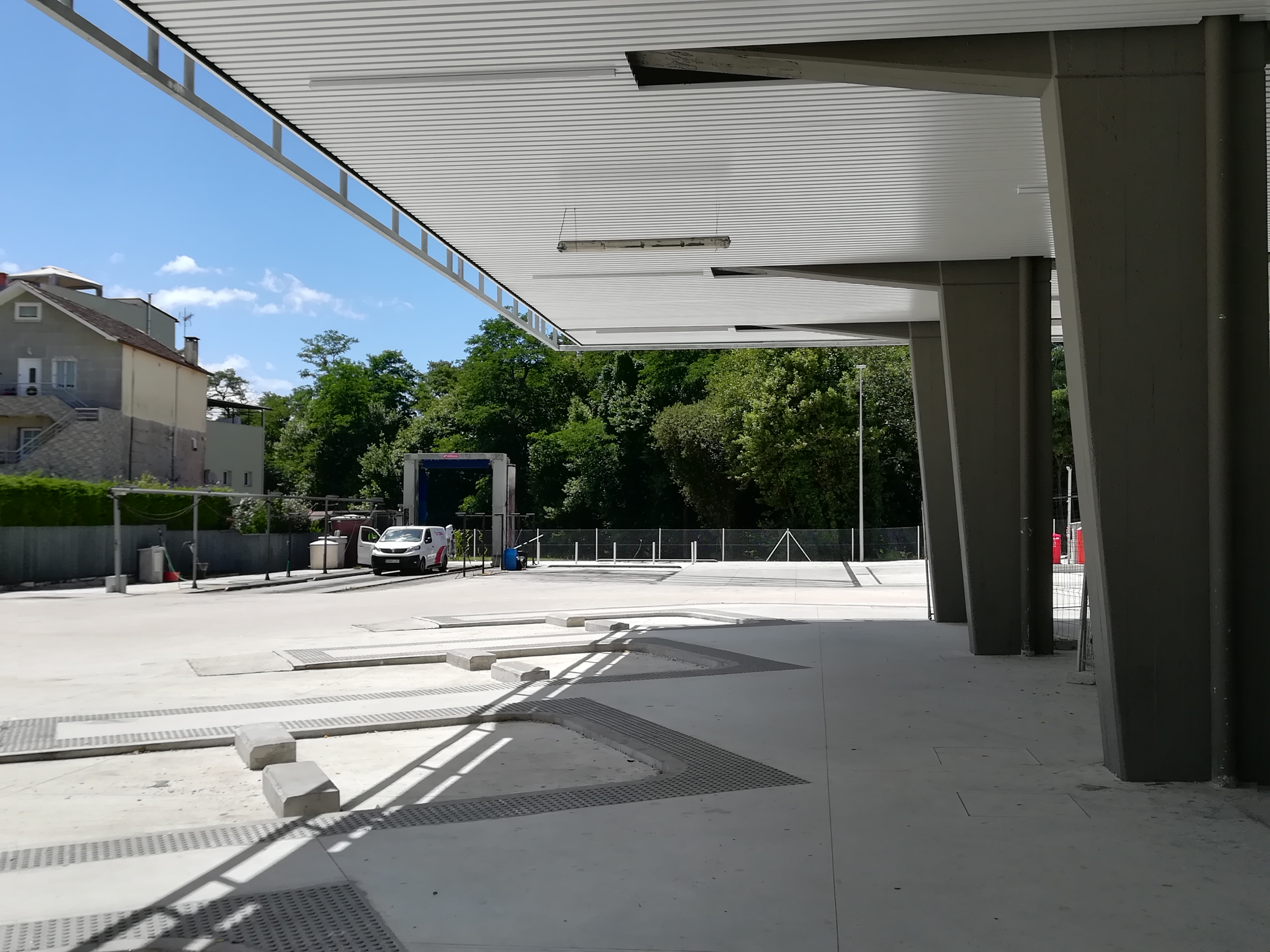
East side platforms

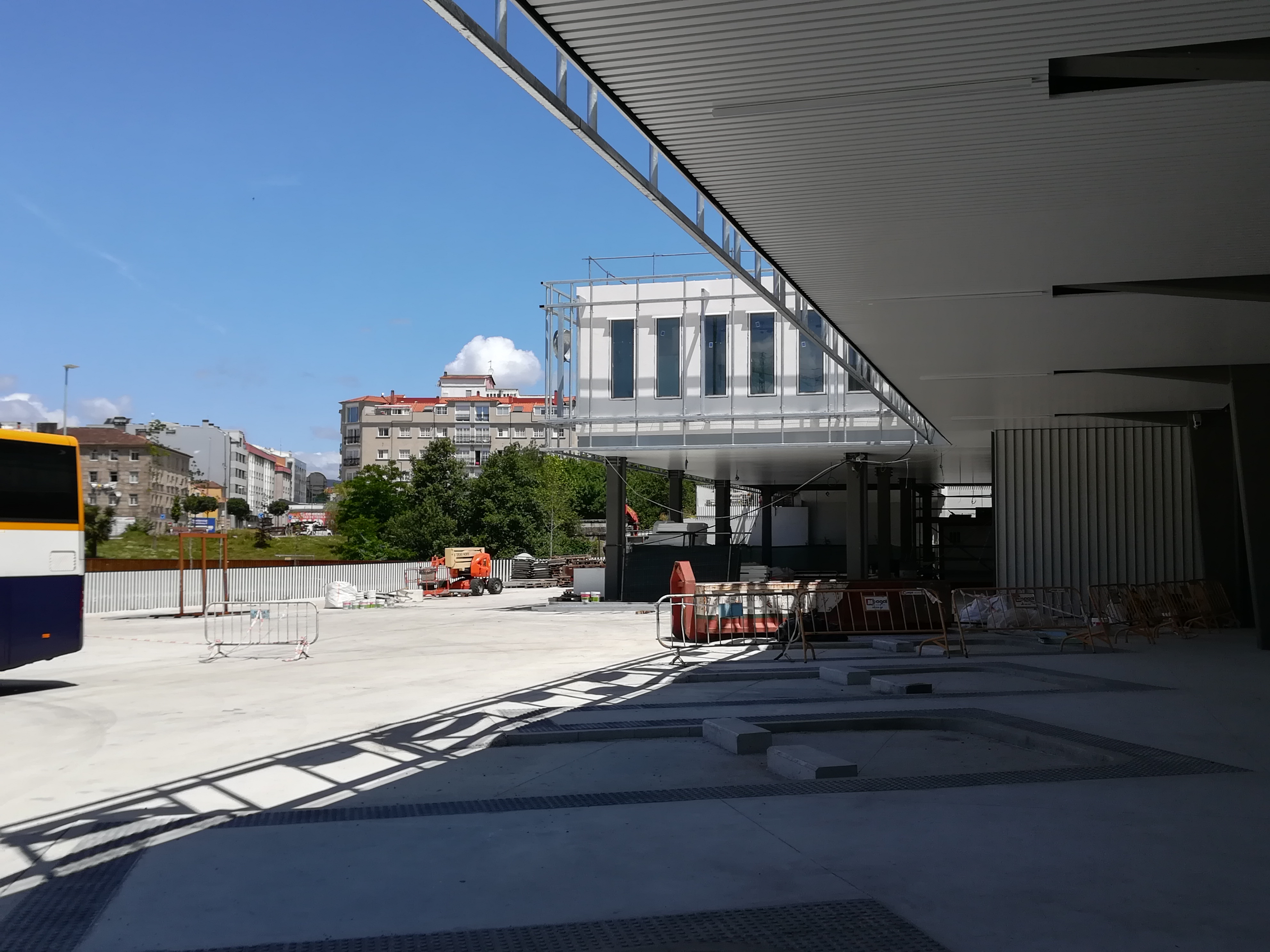
West side platforms

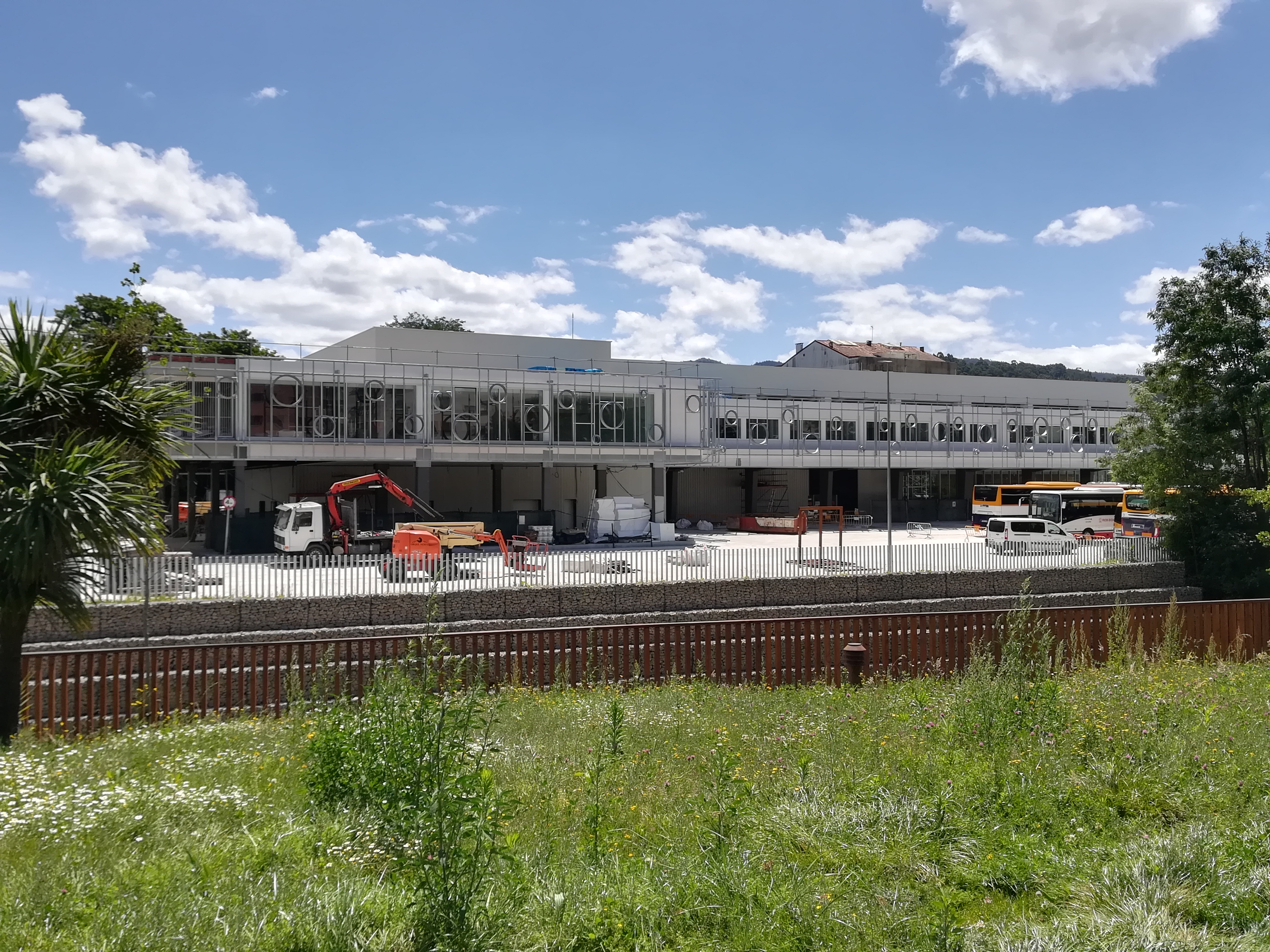
West side of the bus station

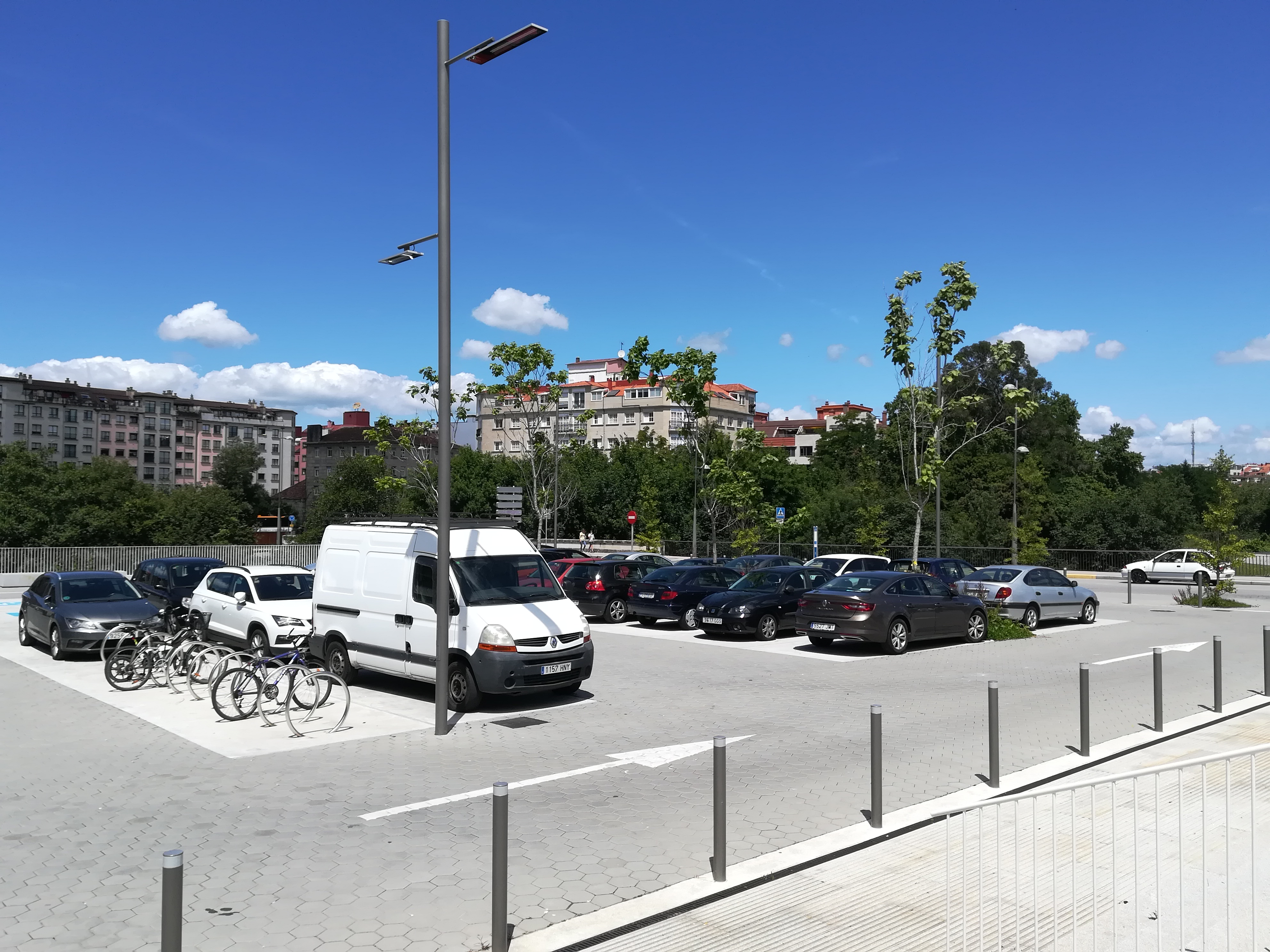
Parking and kiss and ride

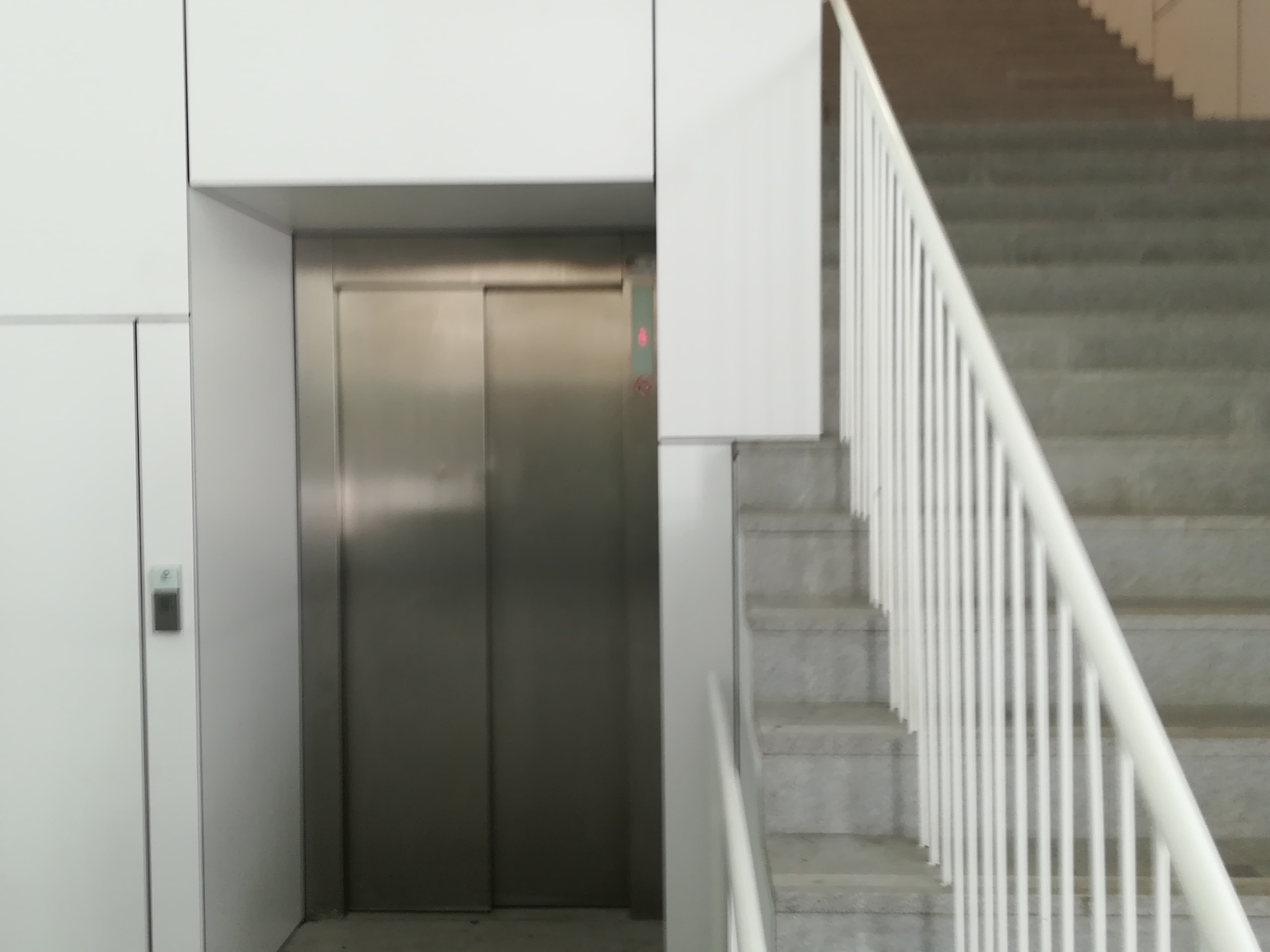
One of the lifts and stairs inside

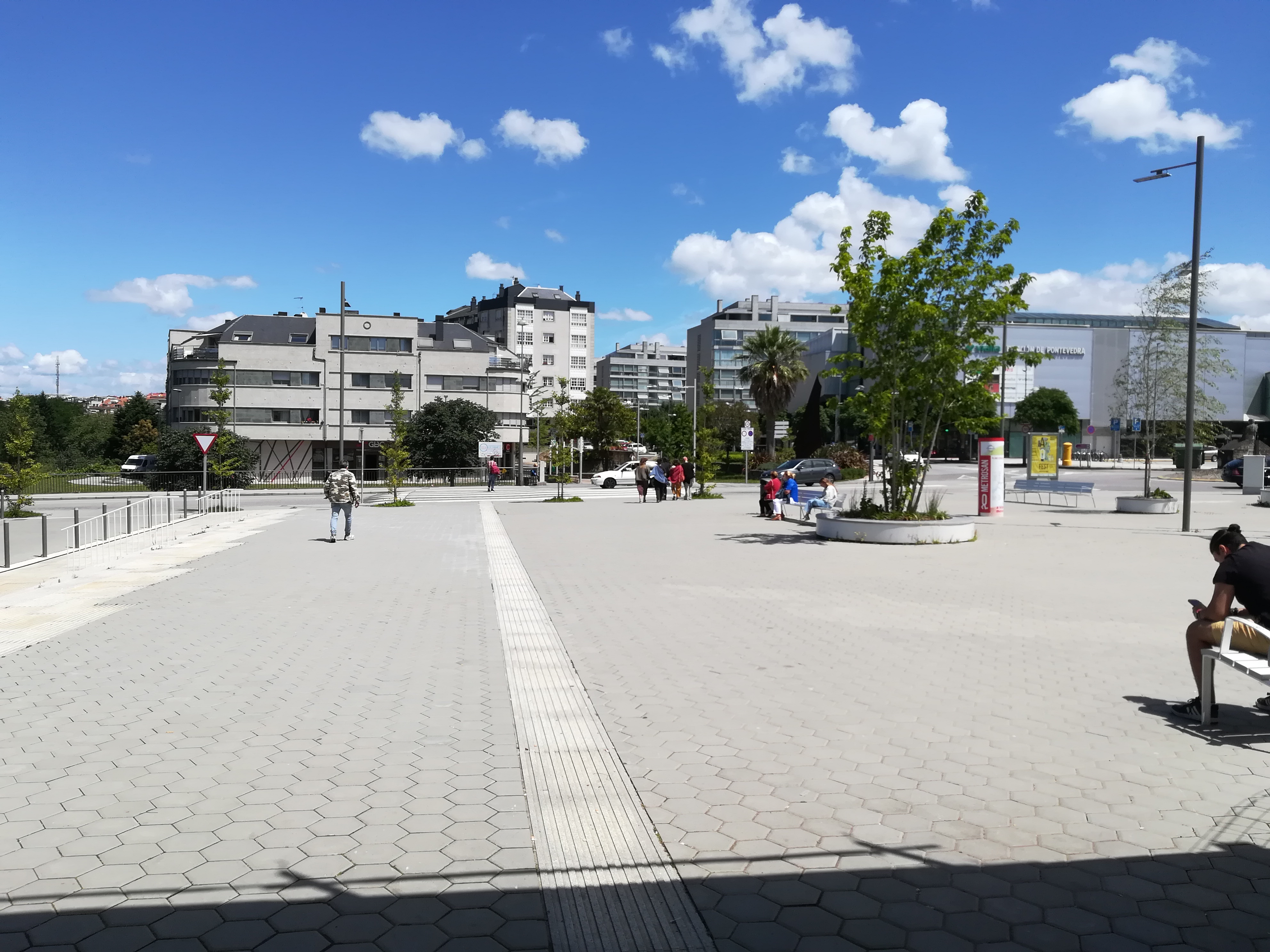
Bus station square with views of Gorgullón Street

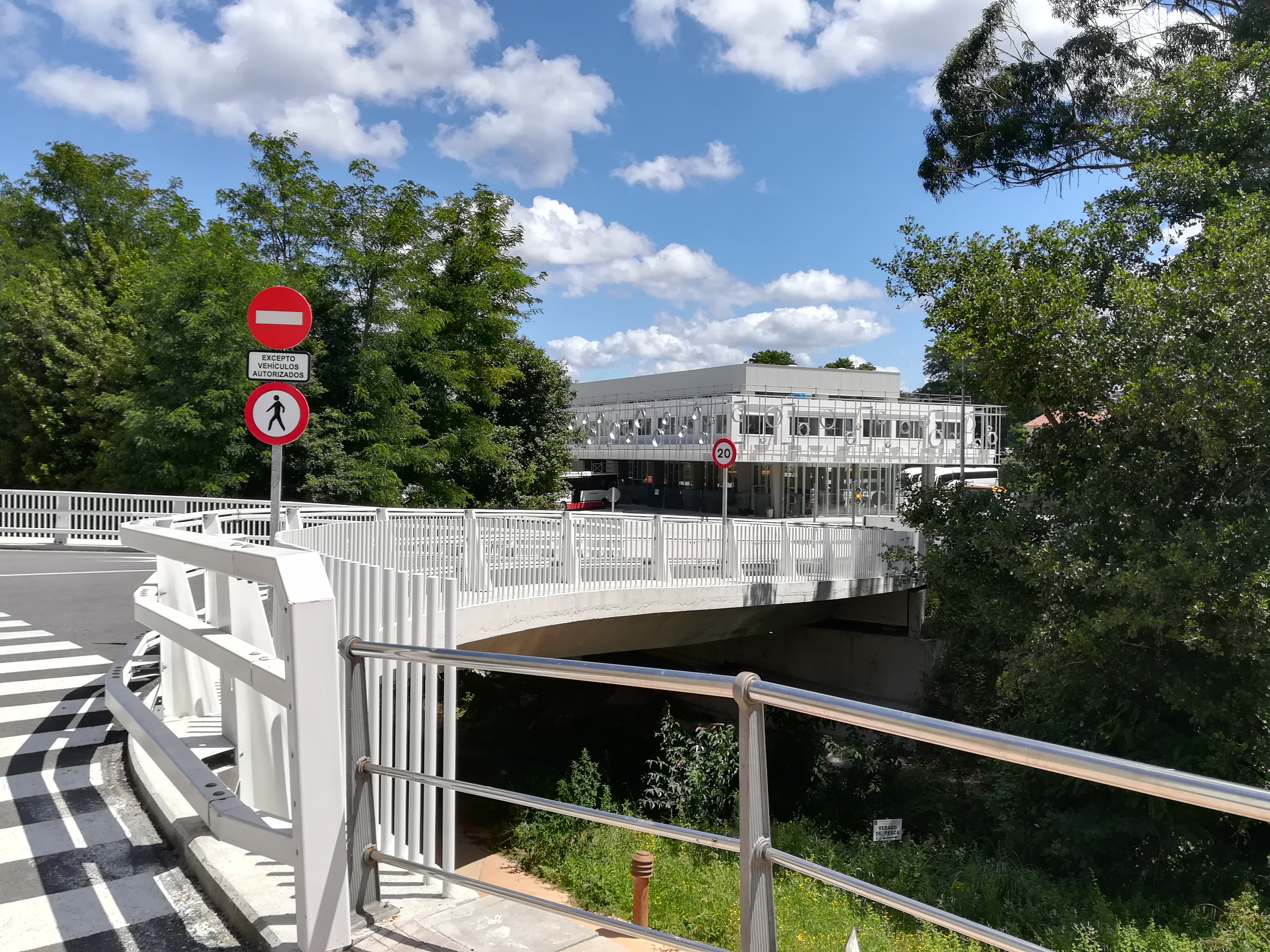
Bridge for the entrance and exit of buses

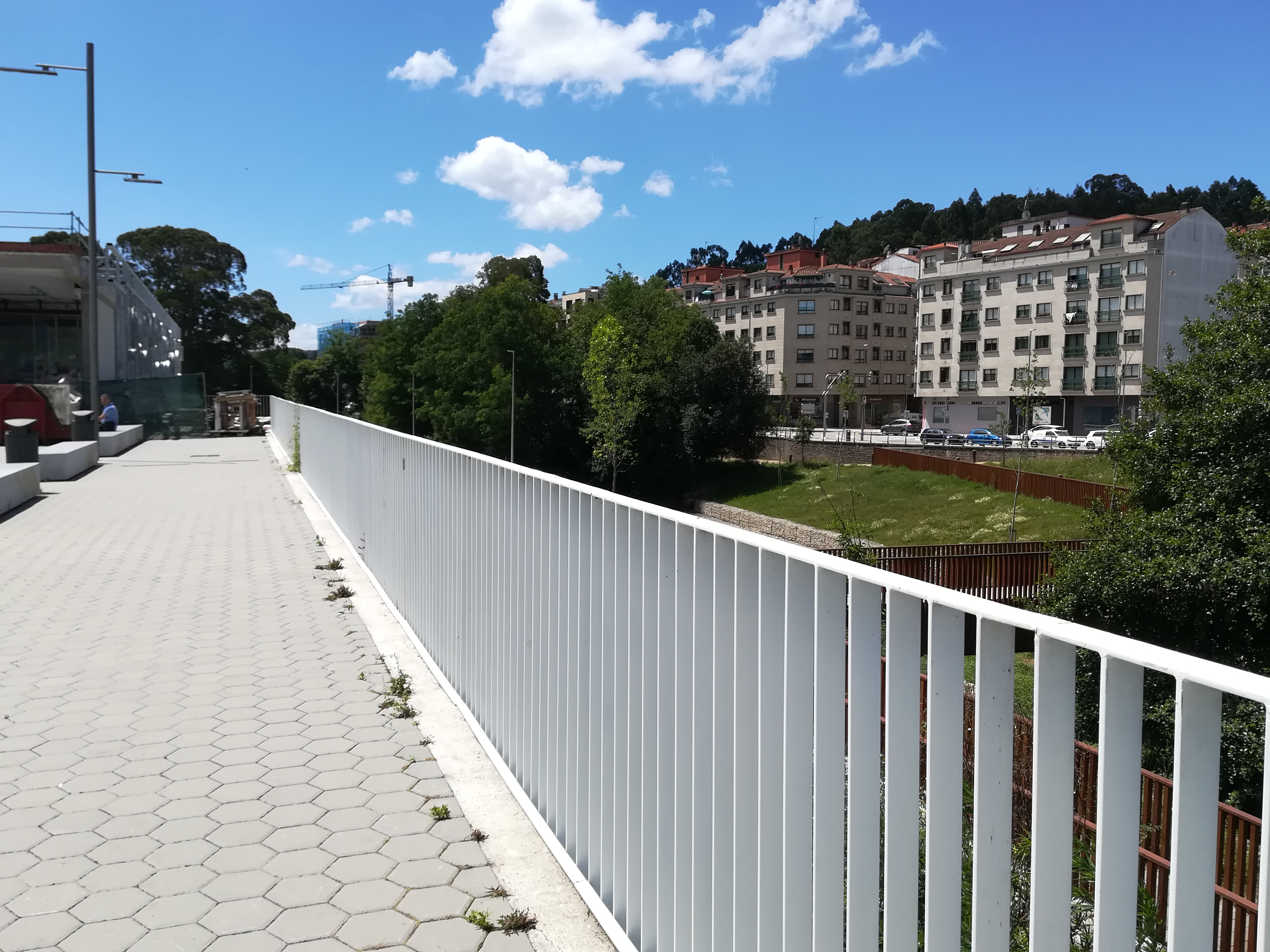
Railing closing off the square overlooking the Gafos river

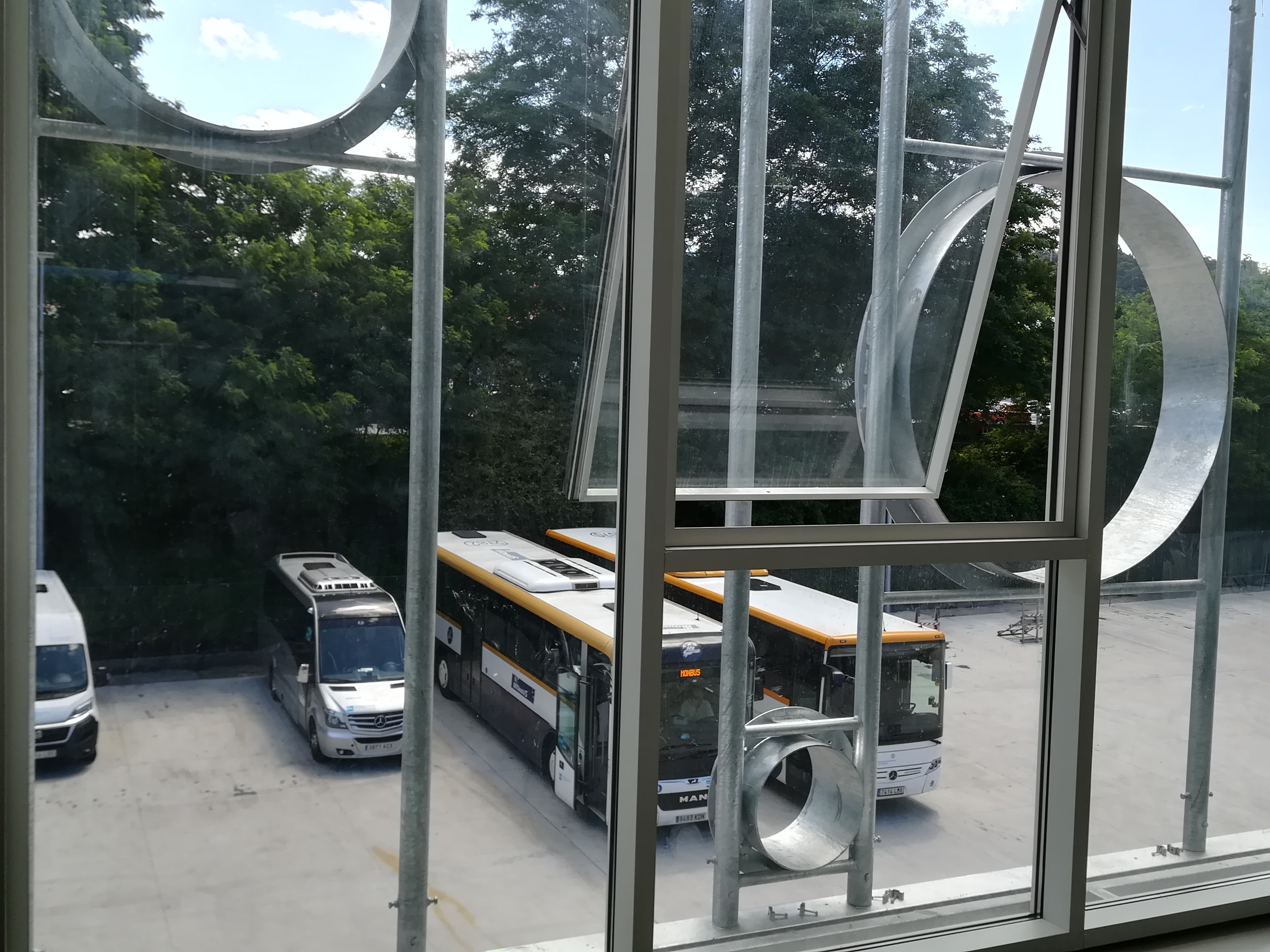
Windows of the bus station with a view of the coaches

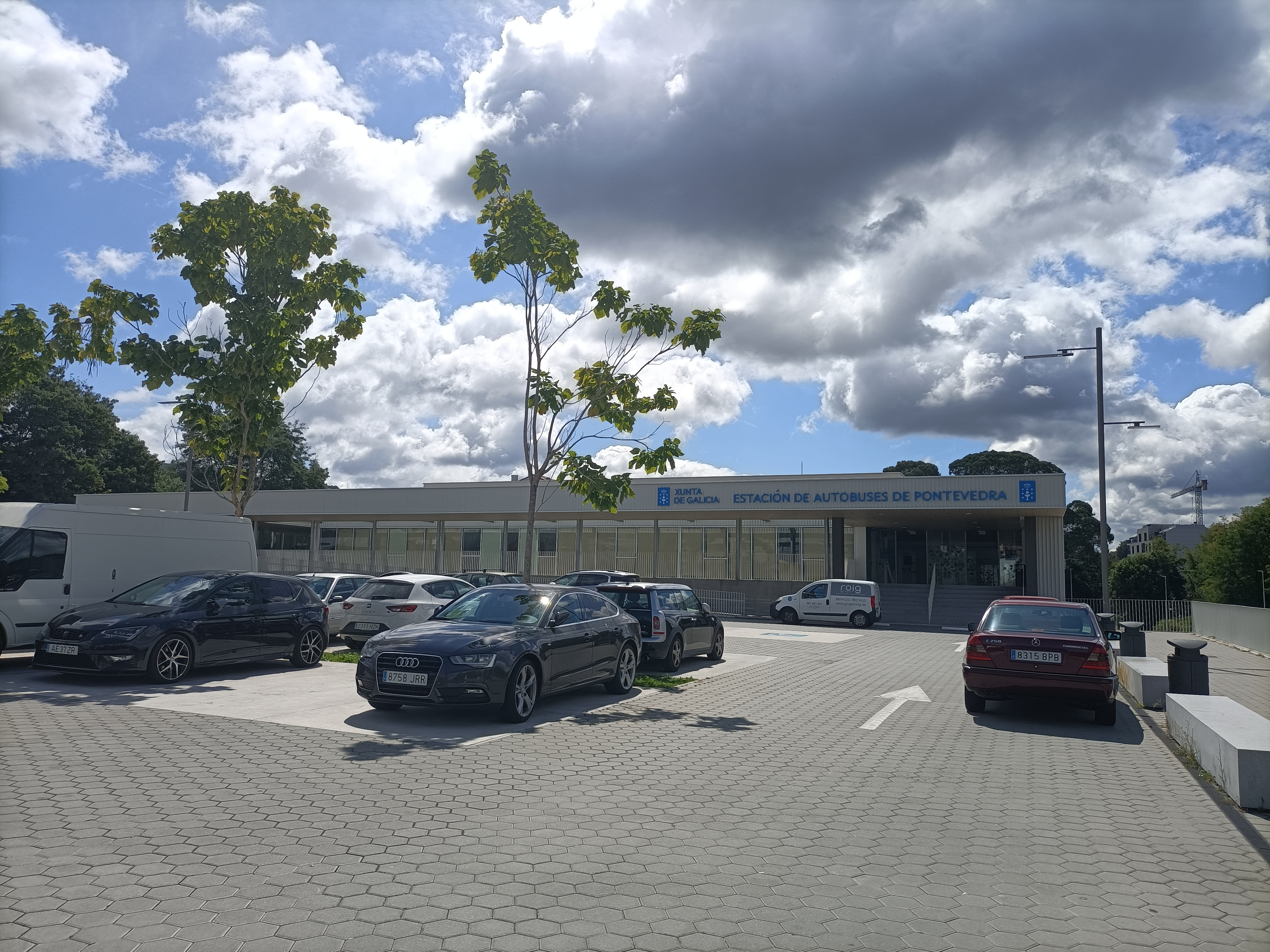
Main entrance of the Pontevedra bus station

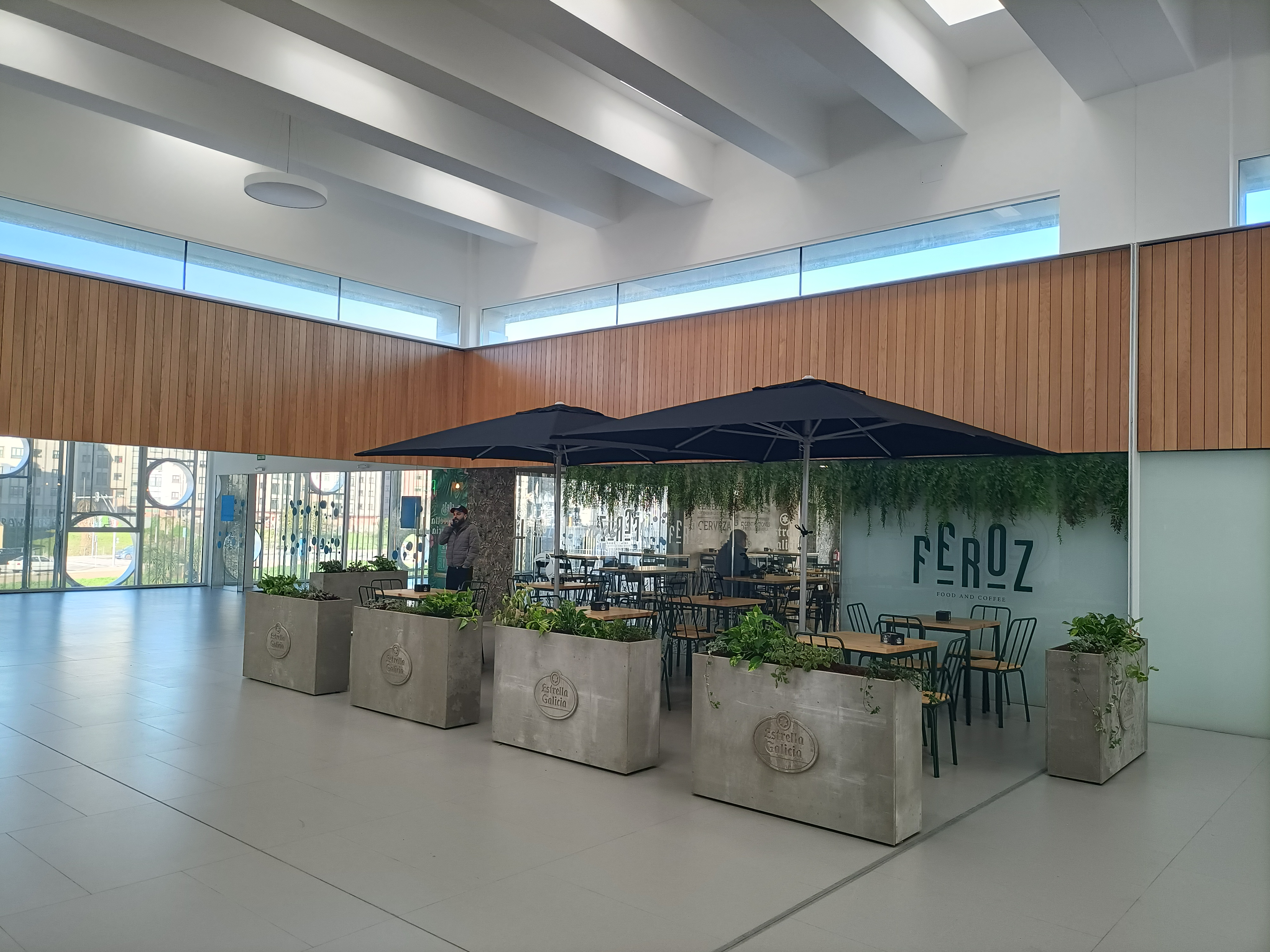
Bus station cafeteria

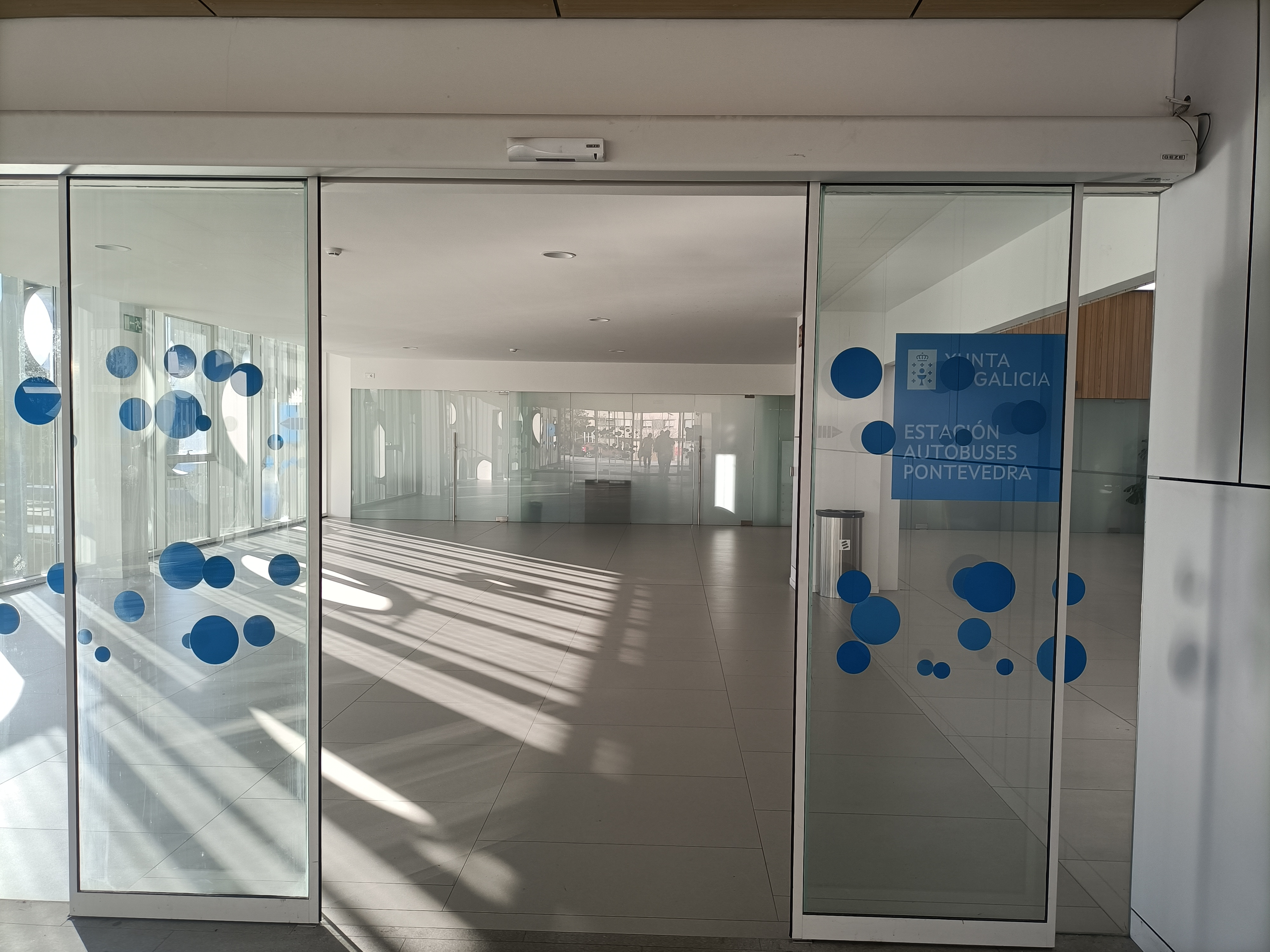
One of the entrances to the central hall

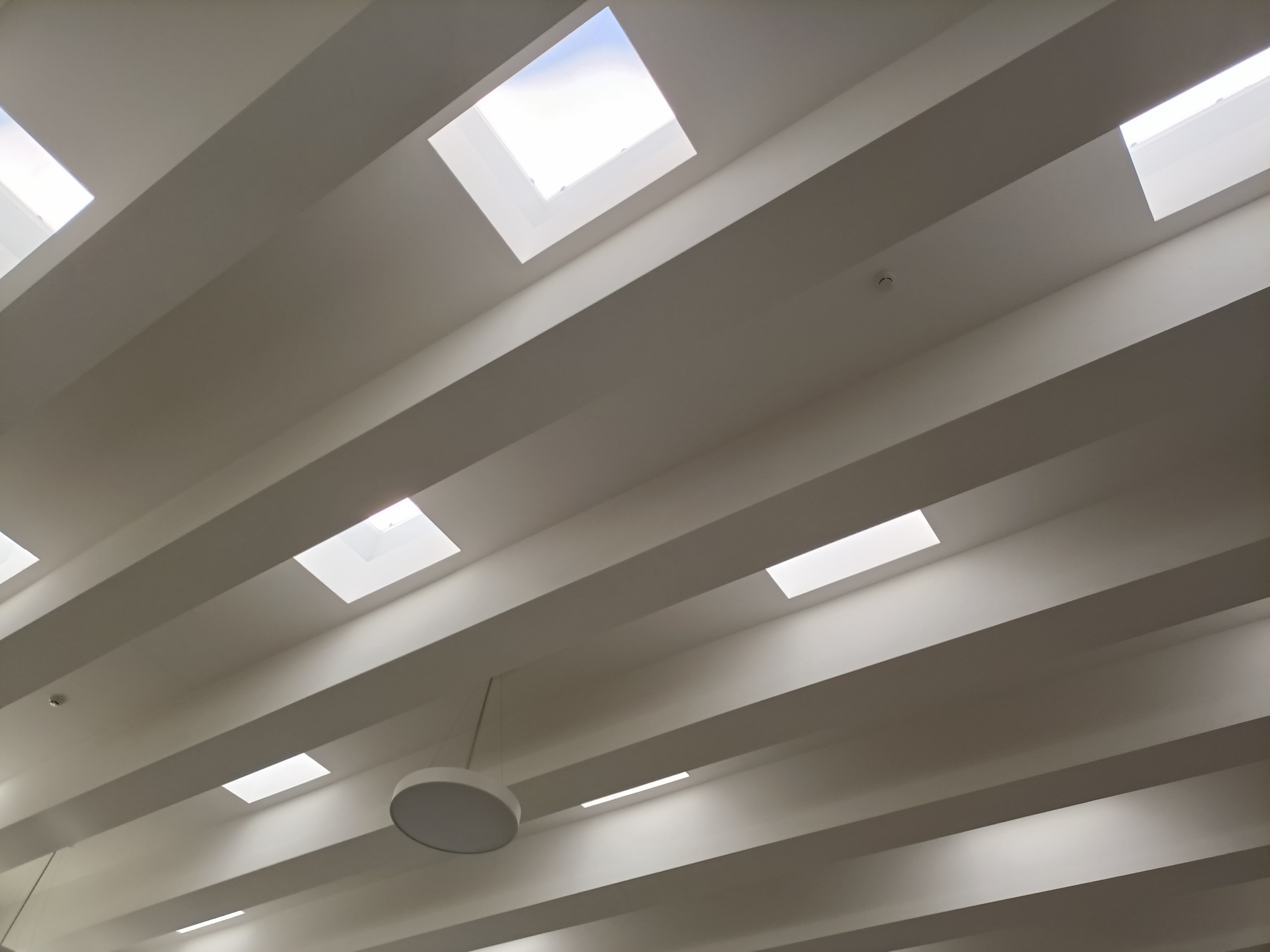
Original skylights in the interior of the station

== See also ==
=== Related articles ===
- Pontevedra railway station

=== External links ===
- Video on the renovation of the station published by the Xunta de Galicia
- Timetables and lines
- Lines serving the station and destinations
