= Pontevedra railway station =

Train station in Pontevedra, Spain

Pontevedra
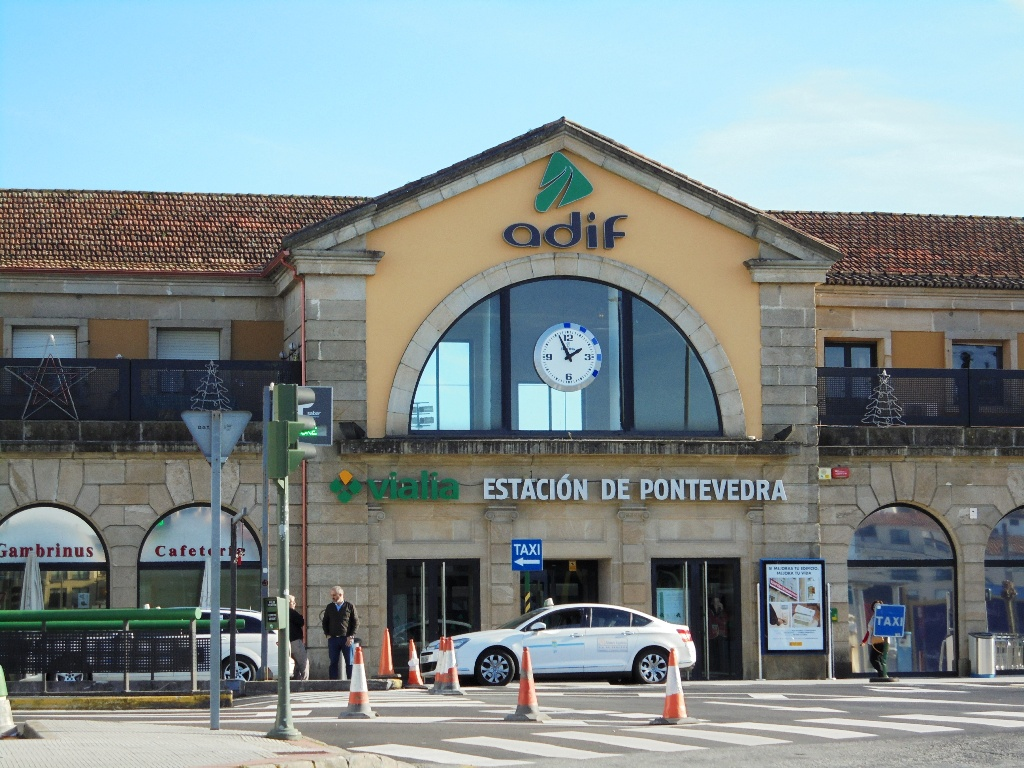

General information
- Location: C/ de la Estación; Pontevedra; 36003- Pontevedra; Spain
- Coordinates: 42.4216°N 8.63574°W
- Owner: adif
- Lines: Atlantic Axis high-speed rail line Redondela-Santiago de Compostela
- Platforms: 3
- Tracks: 7

Construction
- Structure type: At-grade
- Parking: yes
- Cycle facilities: yes
- Accessible: yes

Other information
- Station code: 23004

History
- Opened: 1966

Passengers
- 2022: 1,024,500
Location

Pontevedra Railway Station is a railway station of the Spanish Atlantic Axis high-speed rail line which provides services to the city of Pontevedra, in Galicia, Spain.

== Location ==
The station is located at the end of the Estación Avenue, next to the Portuguese Way in the neighbourhood of O Gorgullón, in the south of the city. There is also a stopping place in the north of the city, called Pontevedra Universidad.

== History ==
The Pontevedra station passenger building is a two-floor structure with an elongated, rectangular plan, clad in stone and adorned in its main entrance with an arch in a triangular pediment. It was inaugurated on 8 August 1966. It is located in the south-east of the city near the Gafos River, where the station was transferred to replace the old central station in the Campolongo district.

On 30 November 2000, the Vialia shopping centre opened in the station annex, where there are also 8 cinemas.

Between 2013 and 2015, Pontevedra railway station underwent an overhaul of its track plan: all platforms and tracks were demolished while three new platforms and a new track bundle with two central through tracks and 5 tracks with a platform were built. A huge underground passage has been made to replace the old one, which is now transformed into a service gallery. Glass lifts were installed in all three platforms and pre-installation for 6 escalators was carried out, finally only two escalators were installed to go up to the 2 most used platforms.

== Services ==
The station has long and medium distance services operated by Renfe on the Atlantic Axis high-speed rail line. It is also served by Avant services marketed as Media Distancia and Cercanías peri-urban (previously Media Distancia).

It also receives freight trains, many of them to the port of Marín and Ria de Pontevedra since 10 July 2002.

The Vialia shopping center has eight cinemas with 1,488 seats. The area of influence is close to 400,000 inhabitants.

There is a taxi stop in front of the station.

| Preceding station | Renfe Operadora | Following station |
|---|---|---|
| Ourense-Empalme towards Madrid Chamartín | Alvia | Vigo-Urzáiz Terminus |
| Vilagarcía de Arousa towards Madrid Chamartín | Alvia | Terminus |
| Arcade towards Vigo-Guixar | Media Distancia 1 | Pontevedra-Universidad towards A Coruña |
| Redondela AV towards Vigo-Urzáiz | Avant | Vilagarcía de Arousa towards A Coruña |

== Gallery ==
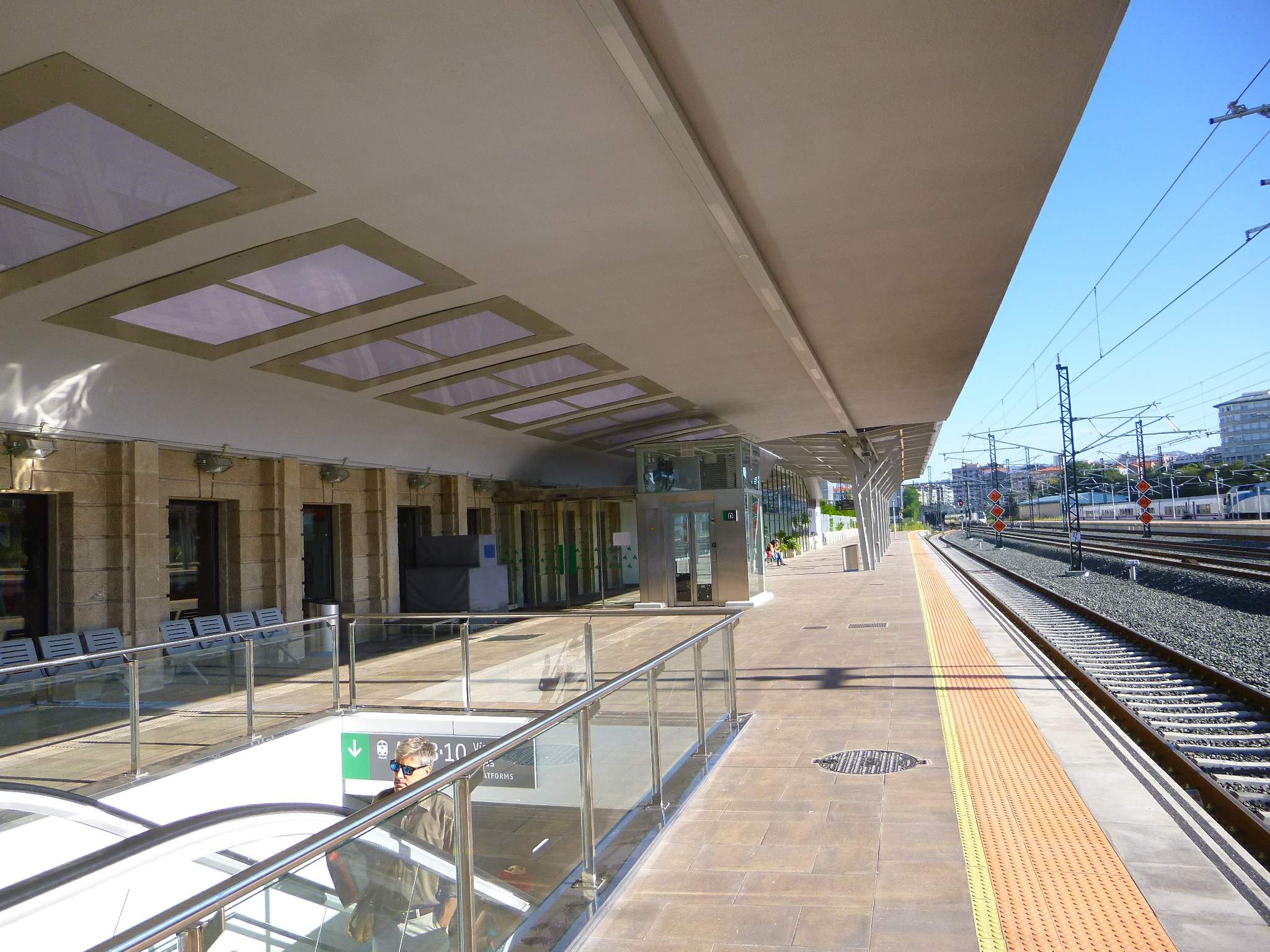
Platforms

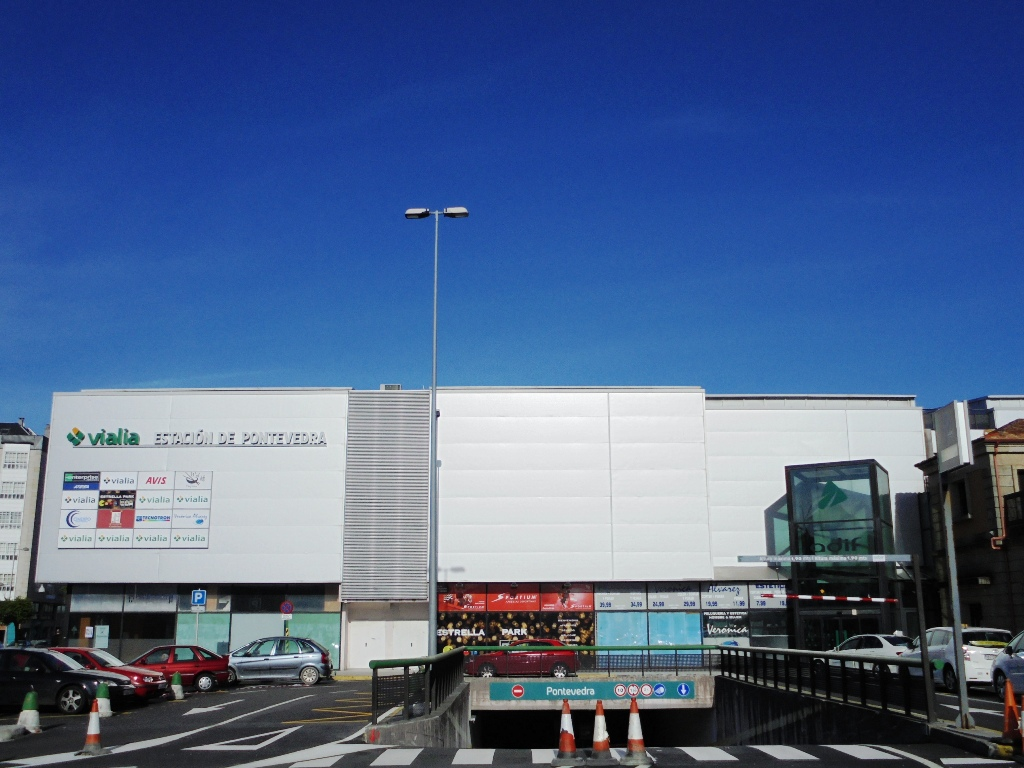
Vialia shopping center

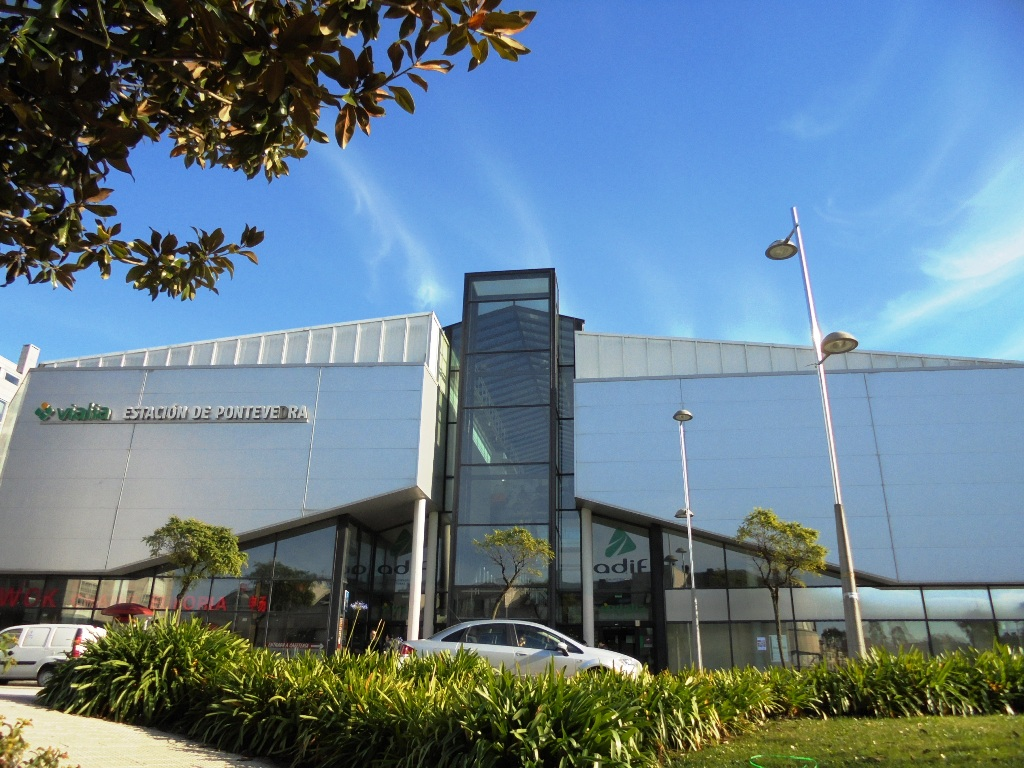
Vialia shopping center, main entrance

== See also ==
=== Related articles ===
- Pontevedra-Universidad railway station
- Atlantic Axis high-speed rail line
- Pontevedra bus station

=== External links ===
- Pontevedra station listing at Adif website
- Official webpage available to buy train tickets and check the timetable
