= Santiago de Compostela railway station =

Railway station in Santiago de Compostela, Spain

Santiago de Compostela-Daniel Castelao
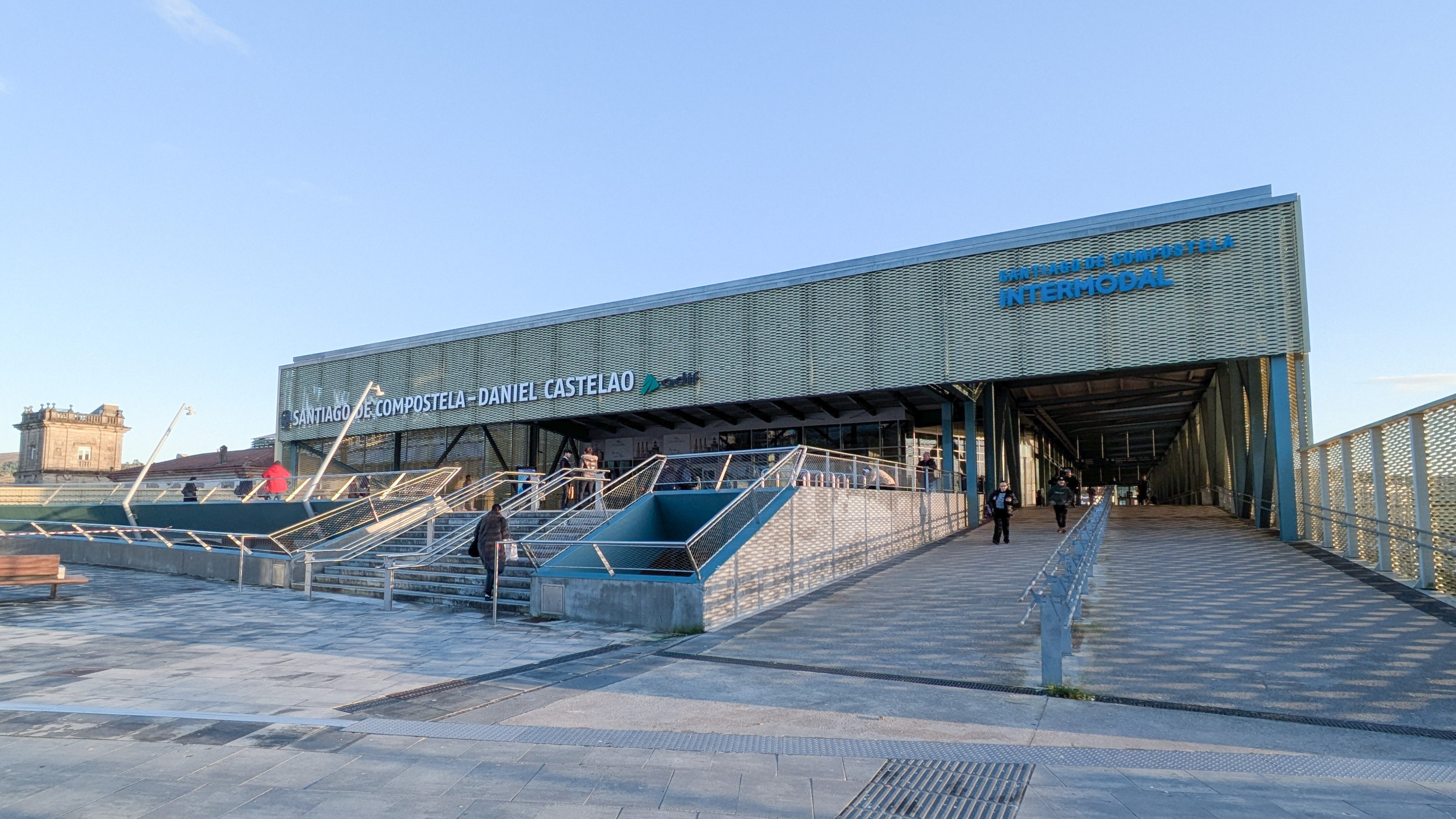

General information
- Coordinates: 42.8708°N 8.5447°W
- Owner: Adif
- Operator: Renfe
- Lines: Madrid–Galicia high-speed rail line Atlantic Axis high-speed rail line Zamora-A Coruña; Redondela-Santiago de Compostela
- Platforms: 5

Construction
- Accessible: yes

History
- Opened: 14 April 1943

Passengers
- 2024: 4,370,826
Location

Santiago de Compostela-Daniel Castelao is the railway station of the Galician capital Santiago de Compostela, Spain. In 2024, it registered a traffic of 4.3 million passengers, being the busiest railway station in Galicia.

== History ==
The arrival of the train to Santiago is linked to the first railway line put into operation in Galicia, which connected the city with Carril (now part of Vilagarcía de Arousa) and which would be extended shortly after to Pontevedra. The first station of the city, inaugurated on September 15, 1873, was located in Cornes, then part of the municipality of Conxo, which was annexed to Santiago de Compostela in 1925.

In 1943, with the construction of the railway line to A Coruña, the current station was built, and the old one was used solely for freight transport. The building draws inspiration from the traditional Galician manor houses, known as pazos, and includes a metal structure over the tracks.

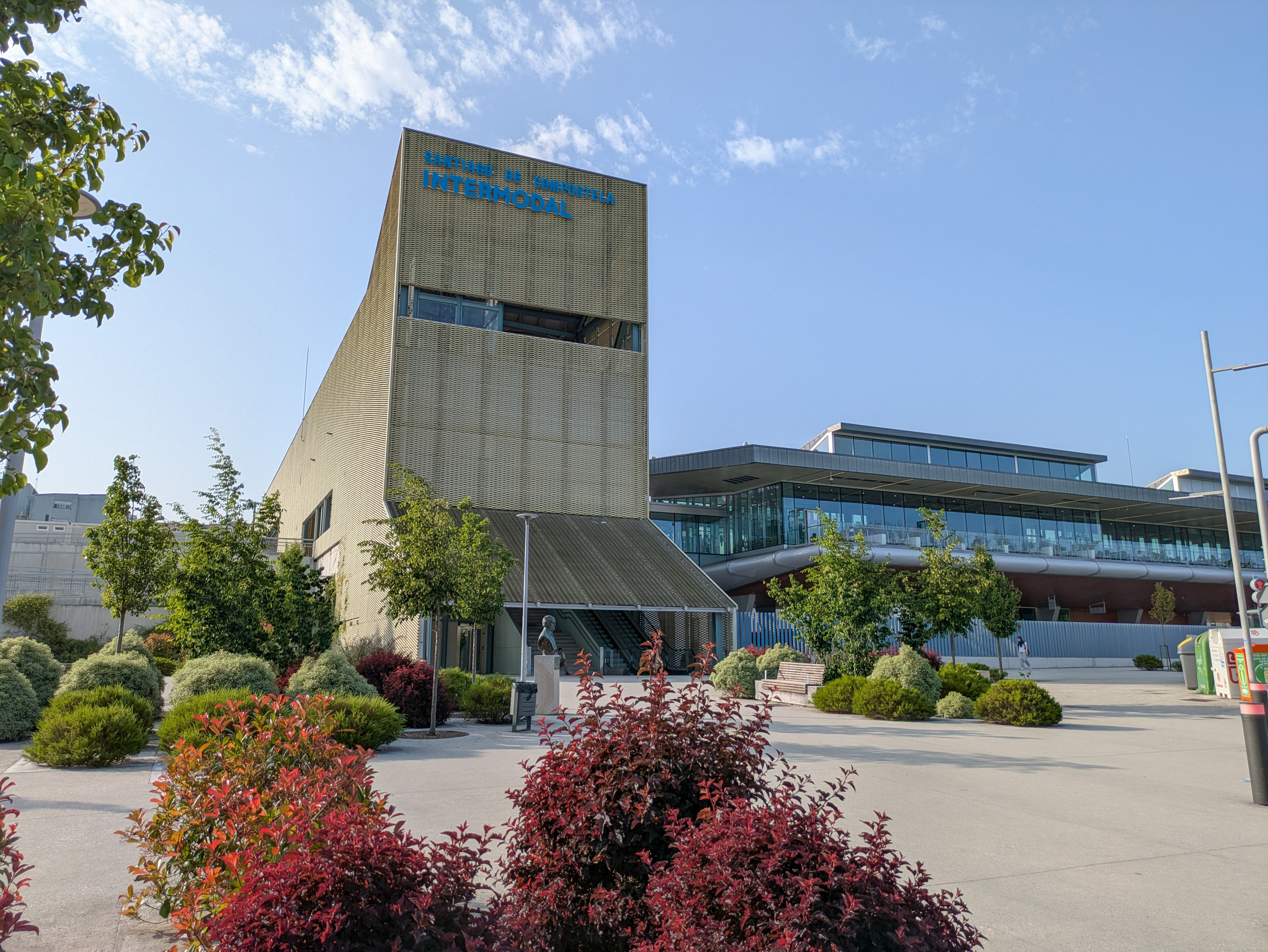
South entrance to the train and bus stations

The station became part of the Spanish high-speed rail network in 2011, with the construction of the line between A Coruña and Ourense (later part of the Madrid–Galicia high-speed rail line). In 2015 the Atlantic Axis high-speed rail line was inaugurated, connecting the city with Pontevedra and Vigo. Shortly after, the construction of the new passenger building began, which became operational in the summer of 2025. It was designed by the Spanish architect Juan Herreros and named after the Galician politician and writer Alfonso Daniel Rodríguez Castelao.

== Services ==
Preceding station	Renfe Operadora	Following station
Ourense-Empalme towards Madrid Chamartín	Alvia	A Coruña towards Ferrol
Ourense-Empalme towards Madrid Chamartín	Alvia	Vilagarcía de Arousa towards Pontevedra
Ourense-Empalme towards Barcelona Sants	Alvia	A Coruña Terminus
Carballino towards Hendaye	Intercity	A Coruña Terminus
Ourense-Empalme Terminus	Avant	A Coruña Terminus
Vilagarcía de Arousa towards Vigo-Urzaiz	Avant	A Coruña Terminus
Osebe towards Vigo-Guixar	Media Distancia 1	Ordes towards A Coruña
