= Atlantic Axis high-speed rail line =

Train path in northwest Spain

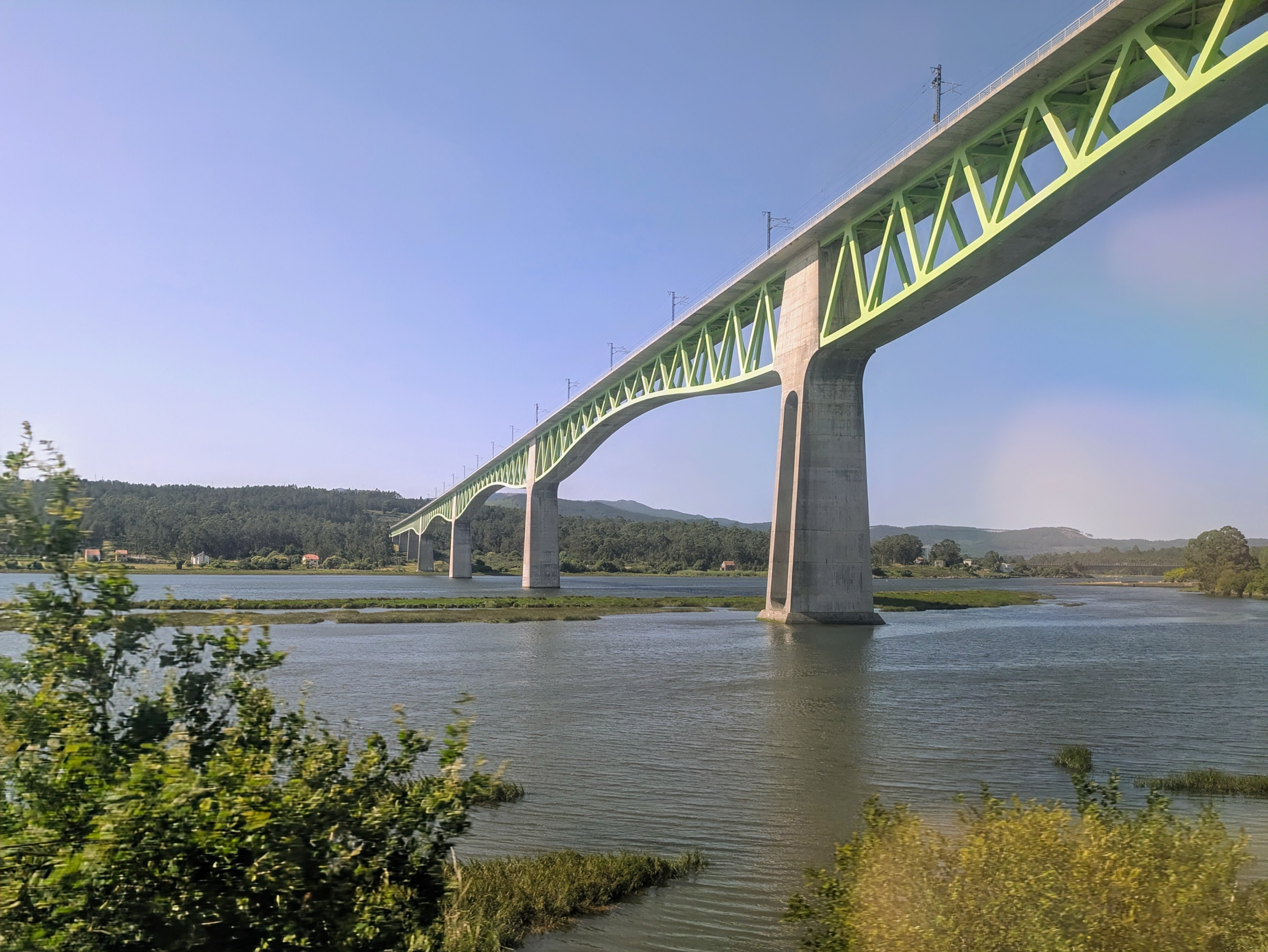
- Ulla Viaduct

Overview
- Status: Operational
- Owner: Adif
- Locale: Spain (Galicia)
- Termini: A Coruña; Vigo-Urzáiz
- Stations: A Coruña; Santiago de Compostela; Vilagarcía de Arousa; Pontevedra; Vigo-Urzáiz

Service
- Type: High-speed rail
- Operator: Renfe Operadora
- Ridership: 3.6 million (2017)

History
- Opened: 20 April 2015

Technical
- Line length: 155.6 km (96.7 mi)
- Num of tracks: Double track
- Track gauge: 1,668 mm (5 ft 5 21/32 in) Iberian gauge
- Electrification: 25 kV 50 Hz
- Operating speed: 200 km/h; (design speed 250 km/h)

The Atlantic Axis high-speed rail line, also called Atlantic Corridor high-speed rail line, is a high-speed railway line that links A Coruña, Santiago de Compostela, Pontevedra and Vigo in Spain. The Atlantic Axis was inaugurated in April 2015.

== History ==
Construction started in 2001 and the first section between A Coruña and Santiago de Compostela opened in 2009 and was electrified in 2011. The extension from Santiago de Compostela to Pontevedra and Vigo completed in March 2015 and the entire line was inaugurated on 18 April 2015. The total investment of the project exceeded €3 bn.

The line was planned to be extended to the south towards the border between Spain and Portugal and with a further connection to the city of Porto as the Porto–Vigo high-speed rail line, including the longest railway bridge on the Iberian Peninsula for the 4.5 km crossing of the Minho River. It was also planned to be extended to the north from A Coruña to Ferrol. However, these plans were shelved in 2011. The plans were reactivated by the Portuguese government in 2020.

== Features ==
A map of the Spanish HSR network, with the Atlantic Axis highlighted in red

The line has a length of 155.6 km of Iberian gauge track of 1,668 mm (5 ft 5 21/32 in), which is due to be converted to Standard gauge 1,435 mm (4 ft 8 1/2 in). It is an upgrade of the former 241 km non electrified single railway line between the town of Ferrol and the Portuguese border into a double electrified high-speed line for the part between A Coruña and Vigo. The new rebuilt railway permits mixed use traffic with a maximum design speed of 250 km/h for passenger trains. The new line has 37 tunnels totalling 59.2 km, 38% of the total length and the longest is the 8.25 km tunnel beneath Vigo which connects the line with the new Vigo-Urzaiz station. It also has 32 major bridges, including a 2.4 km viaduct across the valley of the River Sar. The new line shortens the distance between A Coruña and Vigo by 22 km, from 178 km to 156 km, and cut the travel time from around 3 hours on the old railway down to 1 hour and 20 minutes on the new one. The line is linked to the Madrid–Galicia high-speed rail line at Santiago de Compostela.

Since 2015, the maximum speed between A Coruña and Vigo was 200 km/h, with the fastest journey between the two cities taking 80 minutes (with three stops). ERTMS (European Rail Traffic Management System) railway signaling was installed in the line in August 2023 replacing the ASFA signaling. With ERMTS in operation it is now possible to raise the maximum speed up to 250 km/h and the travel time can be reduced to only 70 minutes (or 64 minutes for an express service with an only stop in Santiago).

== Ridership ==
Within two months of opening in June 2015, the line had carried 400,000 passengers. By January 2017 total cumulative ridership was 5.1 million.
