= A Coruña railway station =

Railway station in A Coruña, Spain

A Coruña-San Cristovo
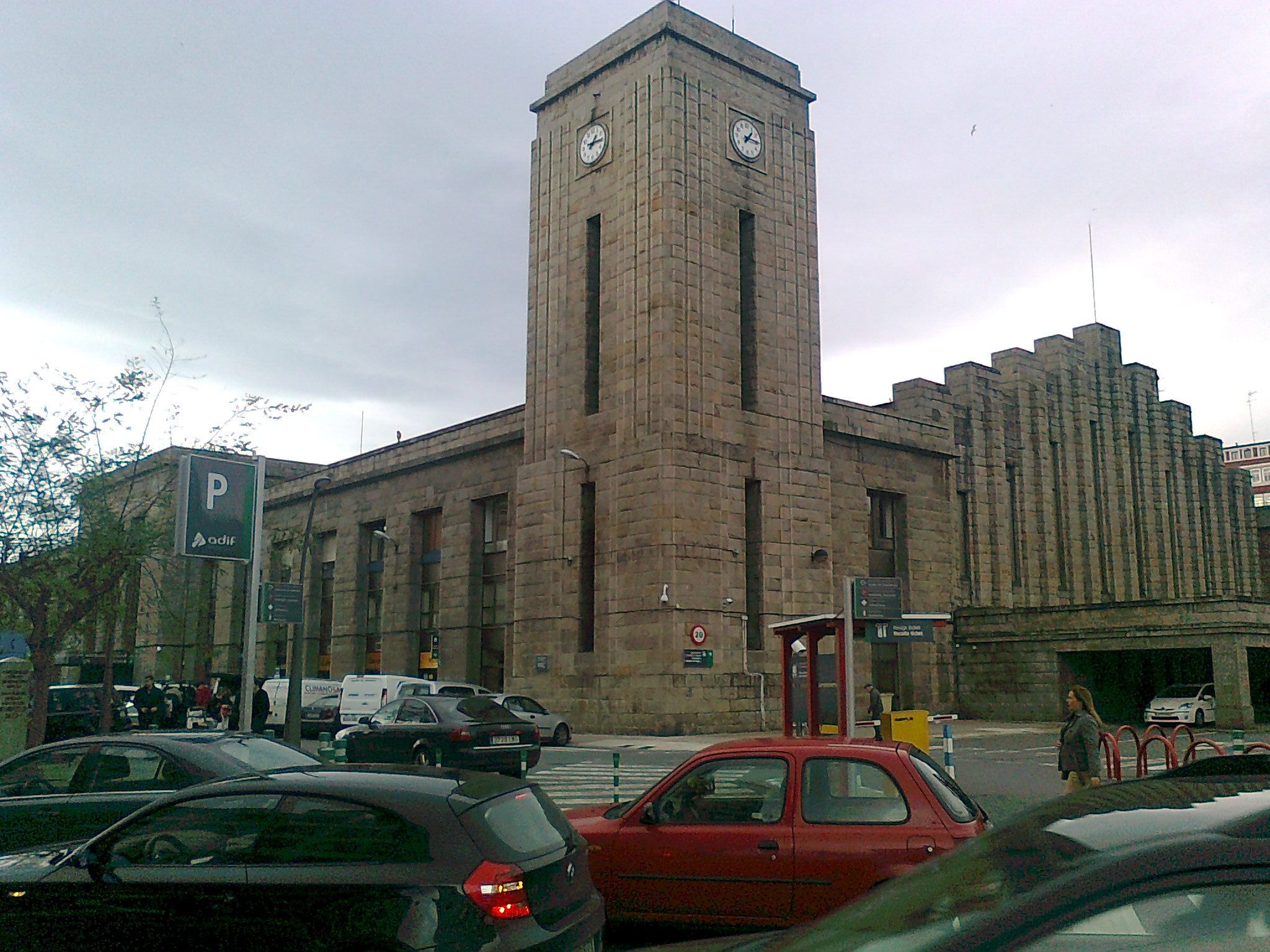

General information
- Location: Rúa Joaquín Planells, s/n A Coruña
- Coordinates: 43°21′9.66″N 8°24′34.96″W
- Owner: Adif
- Operator: Renfe
- Lines: Atlantic Axis high-speed rail line; León–A Coruña railway; Zamora–A Coruña railway
- Platforms: 4

Construction
- Accessible: yes

Other information
- Station code: 31412

History
- Opened: 1935

Passengers
- 2025: 3.48 million
Location

A Coruña railway station, also known as A Coruña-San Cristovo, is a railway terminus in A Coruña, Spain.

== Location ==
The station is located in Avenida do Ferrocarril, next to Ronda de Outeiro, in the neighbourhood of Os Mallos-Estación, relatively far from center but connected by bus. There is another station in the city, San Diego, with goods sidings.

== History ==
=== Background: the A Coruña-Término railway station ===
On 10 October 1875, the railway reached La Coruña with the opening of the A Coruña–Lugo section of the line intended to connect Palencia and the city. Although the work had been started by the North-West Railway Company, it was the Asturias, Galicia and León Railway Company (AGL) that completed it. This company was established to continue the works begun by the North-West Railway Company and to operate its lines following its bankruptcy in the late 1870s. However, AGL's financial situation also quickly became precarious, and it was taken over by Northern Spain Railway Company—known as 'Norte'— in 1885.

That same year saw the opening of a major section between Brañuelas and Ponferrada, furthering the connection between A Coruña and Madrid. As a result, the 'Norte' company decided to build its first permanent station in the city, replacing the initial facilities, which—as was customary at the time—were temporary. The result was a two-storey building with a rectangular floor plan, situated alongside the tracks and featuring a small structure that partially sheltered the side platform.

=== Construction of the new station ===
In the early 20th century, the 'Norte' railway monopoly was threatened by the adoption of the Guadalhorce Plan. Promoted by General Primo de Rivera, the plan aimed to expand the existing railway network with new routes. Among these was a line entering Galicia from the south, running from Zamora to Ourense, continuing on to Santiago and reaching A Coruña.

A new station was built in 1935 to serve the new line. To distinguish between the two, the former 'Norte' station was named A Coruña–Término, while the new one became A Coruña–San Cristóbal. It was designed by the architect Antonio Gascué Echeverría in a stylized Romanesque Revival style, bearing some resemblance to Helsinki Central Station, completed in 1919 by Eliel Saarinen.

However, due to the Spanish Civil War and the complexity of the works on the line, the first train did not arrive at the station until 1943. By then, RENFE had already been the sole operator of the network since 1941.

=== Intermodal station ===
In the 2000s, plans began to take shape to integrate the bus station, railway station, and taxi rank into a single complex, inspired by the ideas of the architect and urban planner Joan Busquets. Of all the entries submitted to the competition for the new intermodal station, seven were shortlisted, from which one was to be selected by May 2011. The seven proposals were submitted by Rafael Moneo, Richard Rogers, MVRDV, Toyo Ito, Juan Herreros, Cruz y Ortiz and César Portela, with the latter being chosen unanimously.

The new station's defining feature is a 200-metre-long, 48.5-metre-wide steel canopy over the tracks, supported by 11.6-metre-high concrete pillars. Meanwhile, the old canopy will be converted into a lobby and retail area, serving as a covered 'public square'. Once construction is complete, expected by the end of 2026, the new station will be named after French actress María Casares, who was born in A Coruña.

== Services ==
Two railway lines terminate at this station. They begin in León and Zamora and connect A Coruña with central Spain. High-speed trains connect the city with Santiago de Compostela, Ourense-Empalme, Pontevedra and Vigo-Guixar. Regional lines also connect the city with Lugo, Monforte de Lemos and Ferrol. Intercity trains depart to Madrid, Barcelona, and the Basque Country, passing through many other important Spanish northern cities.

Preceding station	Renfe Operadora	Following station
Santiago de Compostela towards Madrid Chamartín	Alvia	Betanzos-Infiesta towards Ferrol
Santiago de Compostela towards Barcelona Sants	Alvia	Terminus
Santiago de Compostela towards Hendaye	Intercity	Terminus
Santiago de Compostela towards Ourense-Empalme	Avant	Terminus
Santiago de Compostela towards Vigo-Urzáiz	Avant	Terminus
Uxes towards Vigo-Guixar	Media Distancia 1	Terminus
Elviña-Universidade towards Monforte de Lemos	Media Distancia 4	Terminus
Elviña-Universidade towards Ferrol	Media Distancia 5	Terminus
