= Guillarei railway station =

Railway station in Spain

Guillarei
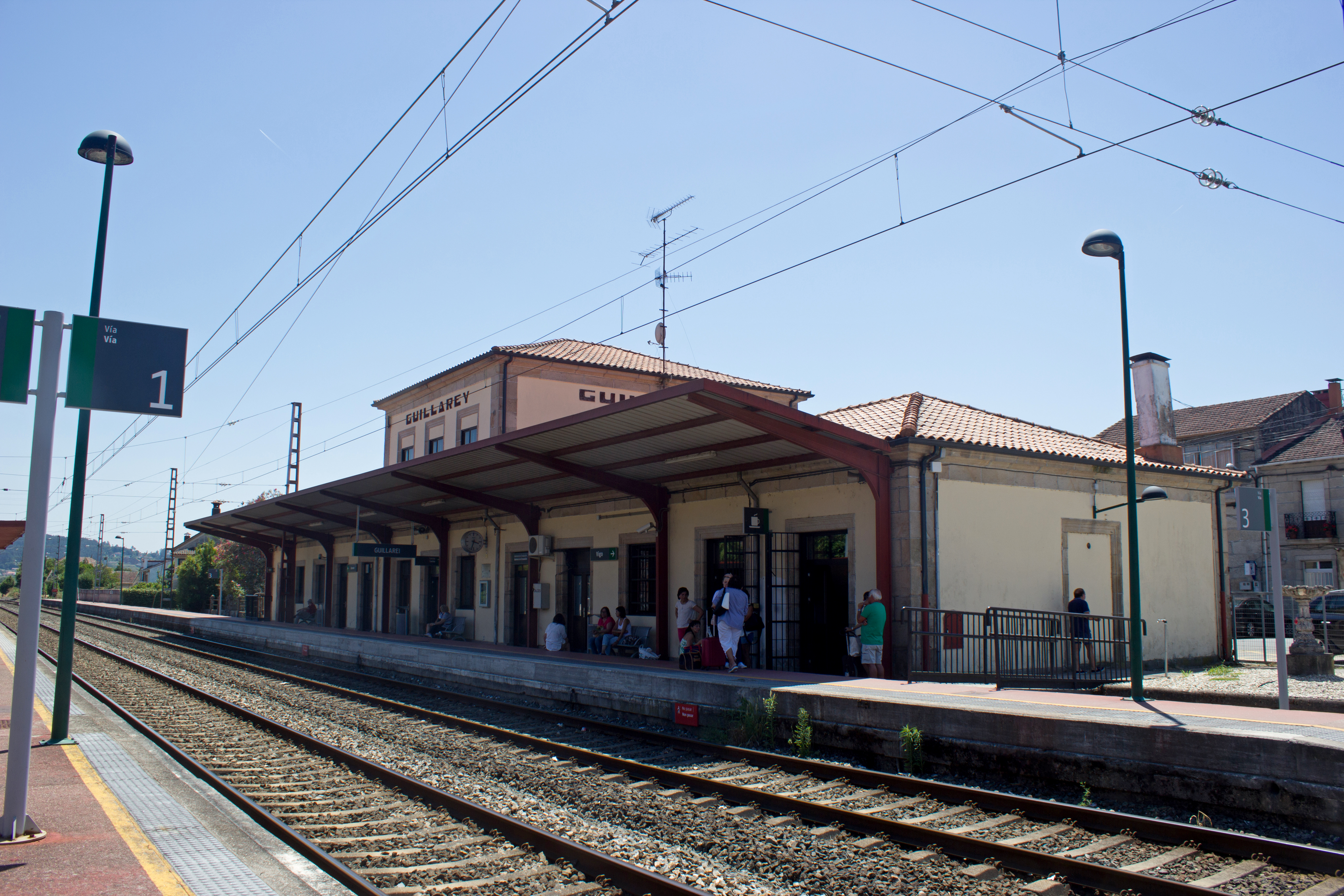
- View of station platforms.

General information
- Coordinates: 42°03′56″N 8°37′21″W
- Owner: Adif
- Operator: Renfe
- Lines: Monforte de Lemos-Vigo; Guillarei-Valença

Passengers
- 2017: 991,383
Location

Guillarei railway station is the main railway station of Guillarei in Galicia, Spain. It mainly serves regional and long-distance traffic across different areas in Galicia and northern Spain in general, as well as connecting local services to northern Portugal.

== Services ==
| Preceding station | Renfe Operadora | Following station |
|---|---|---|
| Ourense-Empalme towards Bilbao-Abando | Intercity | Redondela towards Vigo-Guixar |
| Ourense-Empalme towards Madrid Chamartín | Intercity | Porriño towards Vigo-Guixar |
| Tuy towards Valença | Media Distancia 3 | Porriño towards Vigo-Guixar |
| Caldelas towards León | Media Distancia 6 | Porriño towards Vigo-Guixar |
