= Vigo–Peinador Airport =

Airport in Spain

Vigo–Peinador Airport Aeropuerto de Vigo

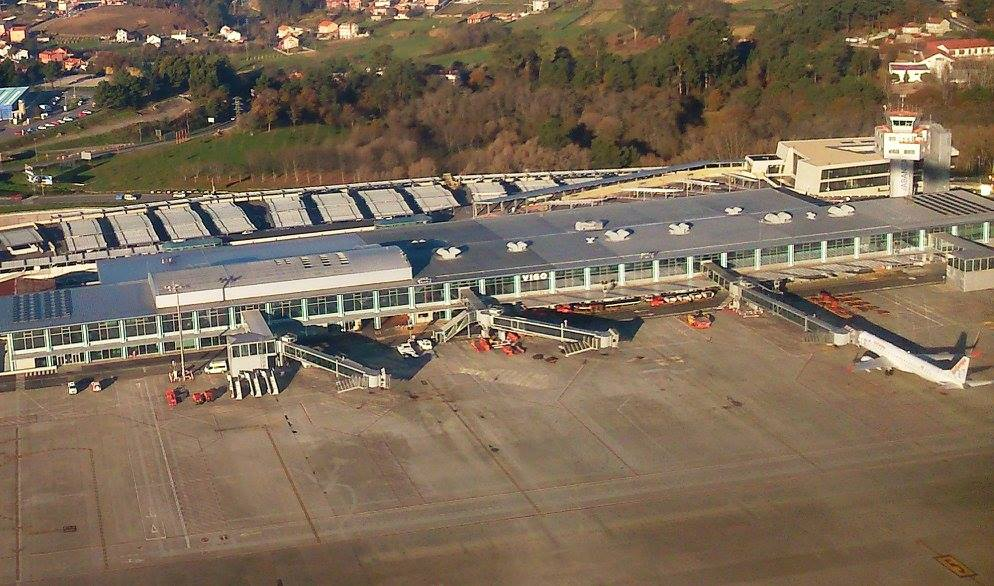
- IATA: VGO; ICAO: LEVX

Summary
- Airport type: Public
- Owner/Operator: AENA
- Serves: Vigo, Spain
- Elevation AMSL: 261 m (856 ft)
- Coordinates: 42°13′45″N 008°37′39″W

Map
- Location within Spain

Runways
Direction	Length		Surface
Direction	m	ft	Surface
01/19	2,400	7,874	Asphalt

Statistics (2025)
- Passengers: 1,114,810
- Passengers change 24-25: ▲5.3%
- Movements: 12,511
- Cargo (t): 421

Vigo–Peinador Airport (IATA: VGO, ICAO: LEVX) is an airport 10 km (6.2 mi) from the centre of Vigo, Spain, and is situated in the municipalities of Redondela, Vigo and Mos.

== History ==
By 1927, the Spanish Government became aware of the necessity of having a customs airport in Galicia. Initially, the harbour of Vigo was equipped for seaplanes and a "maritime airport" was built and started operations at nearby Cesantes beach in March 1929; meanwhile the construction of a larger inland airport at Peinador was initiated.

After years of bureaucratic struggle and negotiations from the local government, the then called Ministerio del Aire fully took on the project and restarted construction in 1947. Following completion of the airport by 1952, operations started in earnest on 20 April 1954 with a 1,500-meter runway. The initial route to Madrid was operated by Iberia flying a Douglas DC-3 aircraft but after a few months Iberia handed the route to Aviaco.

During the 1970s, as traffic at the airport grew, a further development plan was initiated. This involved the construction of a new control tower in 1973, a new passenger terminal in 1974, an independent power plant in 1975 and an expansion of the apron and widening of the taxiways completed in 1976. A few years after, the runway was lengthened so DC-9 series aircraft were able to use the airport. As a result, in November 1981, the airport had its first international flight to Paris–Charles de Gaulle Airport.

In preparation for future air traffic demands, Aena published an airport development project.

In late May 2007, the Board of Aena awarded the construction of the "Vehicle Parking Building, Construction and Technical Block of Vigo airport" to Dragados SA for an amount of €38,266,145 and an execution period of 28 months.

After meeting in the summer of 2008, it was decided to expand Vigo Airport's terminal. However, it took more than a year of delays and conflicting information before a plan was finalised and, on 24 February 2010, the board of directors approved the expansion. The expansion is planned to add 11,200 square meters to the current terminal of 8,200 square meters and also involves the total refurbishment of the existing terminal building. The renovation and extension will raise the annual capacity of the airport to four million users.

In 2021, 549,094 passengers and 805 tonnes of goods passed through the airport.

== Airlines and destinations ==
The following airlines operate regular scheduled and charter flights at Vigo–Peinador Airport:

Airlines	Destinations
Air Europa	Madrid
Binter Canarias	Gran Canaria, Tenerife–North
Iberia	Madrid; Seasonal: Palma de Mallorca, Santander
Vueling	Barcelona

== Statistics ==
=== Busiest routes ===
Busiest domestic routes from VGO (2023)
Rank	Destination	Passengers	Change 2022 / 23
1	Madrid	721,814	▲28%
2	Barcelona	247,223	▼3%
3	Gran Canaria	44,802	▲19%
4	Tenerife-North	39,972	▲12%
5	Palma de Mallorca	18,609	▲6%
6	Bilbao	8,616	▲19%
7	Ibiza	3,507	▲20%
8	Menorca	2,521	▲74%
9	Lanzarote	2,072	▲111%
10	Alicante	1,862	▲29%
Source: Estadísticas de tráfico aereo

== Ground transportation ==
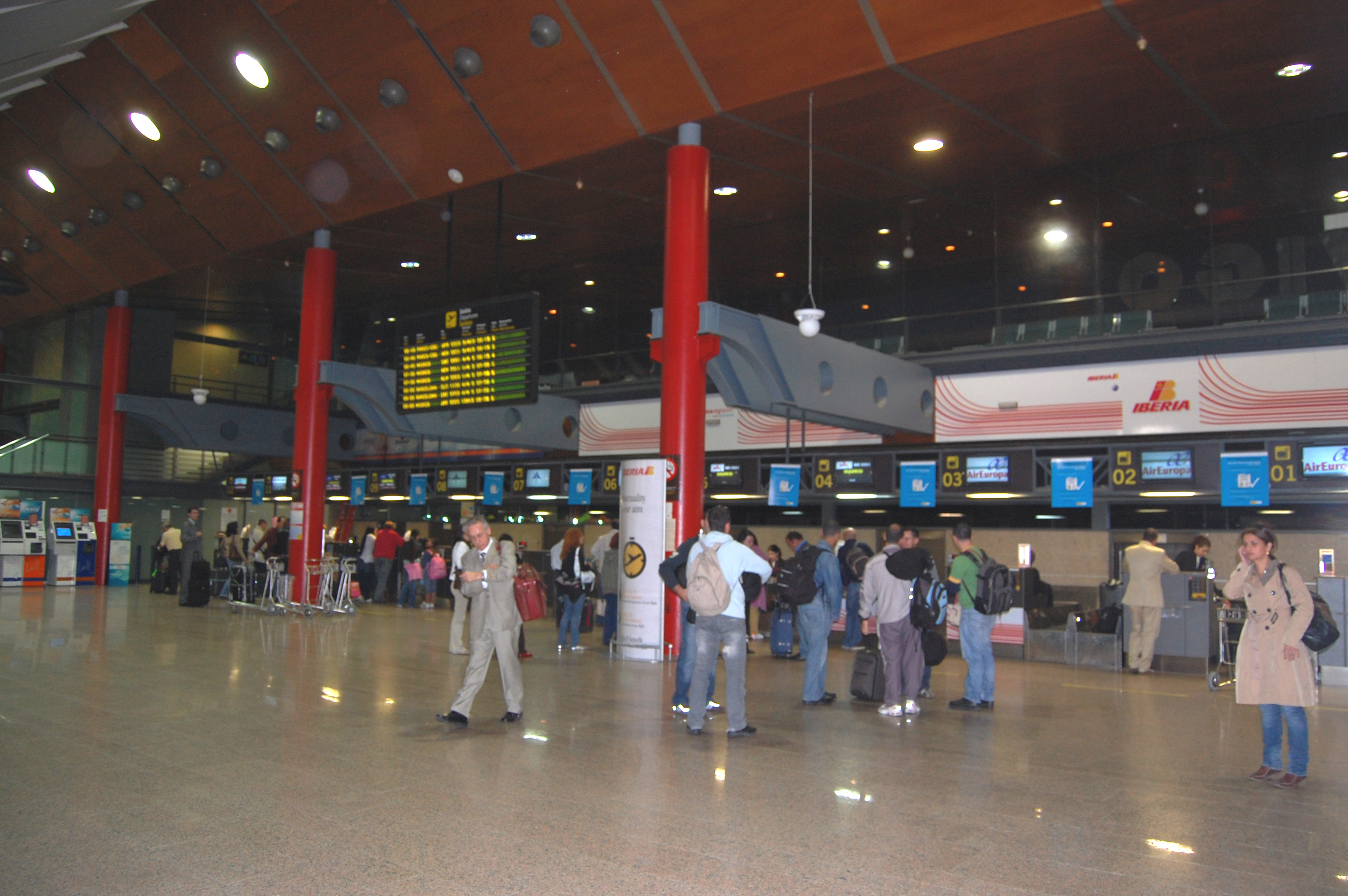
Inside the terminal

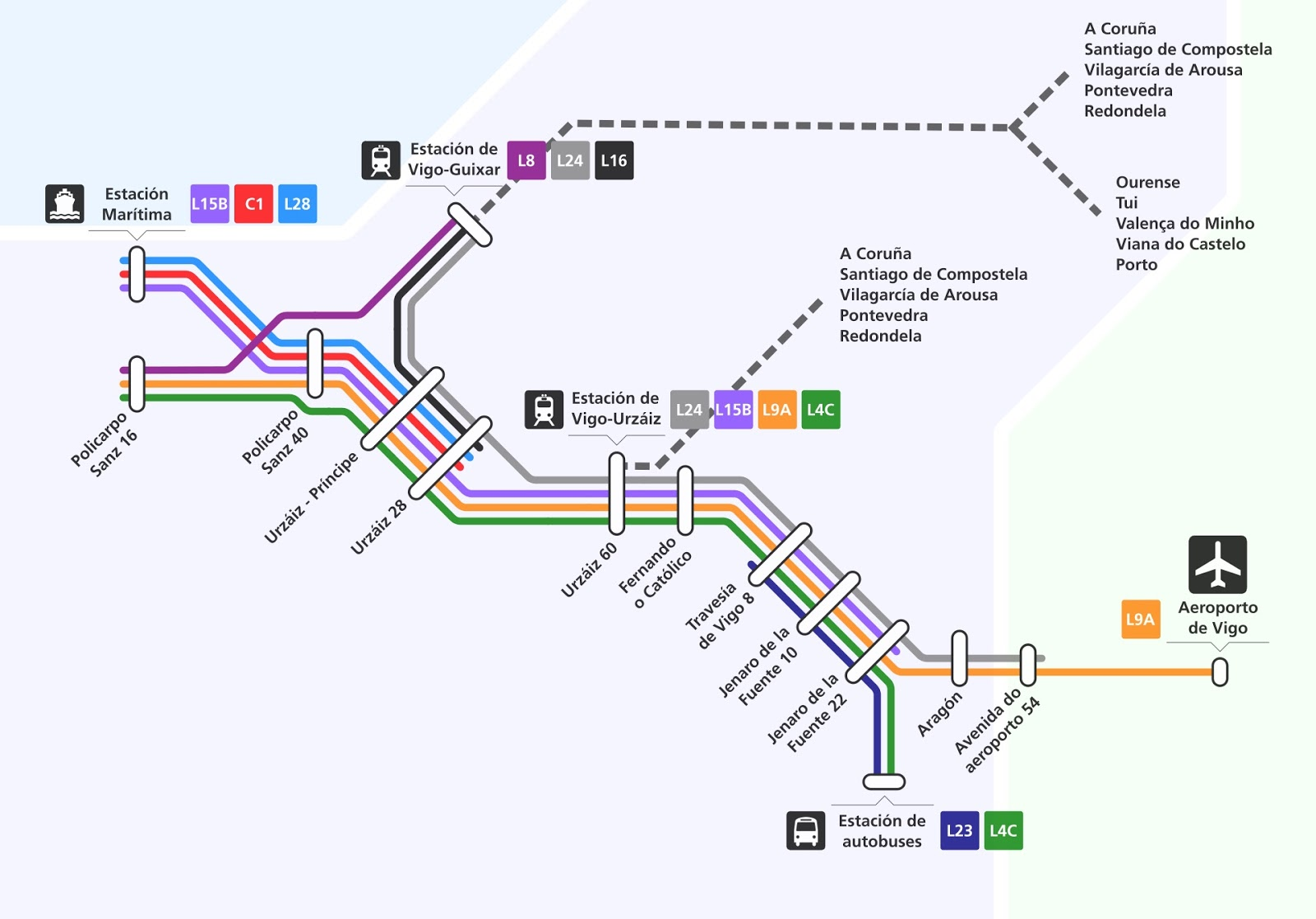
Vigo airport transit map

Vigo Airport is connected to Galicia and North Portugal by different transportation networks. The city public company of transport is Vitrasa, and its 9A line works near the arrival's hall at the terminal. The single fare is €1.57.

=== Train ===
Vigo-Urzáiz railway station is connected to the airport directly by bus line A every 30 minutes at Urzaiz (Muro estación) switch (journey time from the airport to Vigo-Urzaiz railway station: 25 minutes). It provides high speed connectivity to Pontevedra, Vilagarcía de Arousa, Santiago de Compostela and A Coruña. Vigo-Guixar railway station is connected to the airport by bus lines 8, 16 and 24 in connection with bus line A at Urzáiz 13 switch. It provides connectivity to Porto, Pontevedra, Vilagarcía de Arousa, Santiago de Compostela, A Coruña, Madrid, Ourense, Monforte de Lemos, Palencia, León, Ponferrada, Zamora, Redondela, Arcade, Padrón and Ordes. Optionally, direct line A from maritime station is close enough, getting off at García Barbón, 16 switch (15 minutes walking approximately).

=== Bus ===
Vigo bus station is connected to the airport by Vitrasa bus lines 4C and 23 in connection with line 9A at Travesia de Vigo 7 switch (journey time from the airport to Travesia de Vigo, 7 switch: 22 minutes). It provides connectivity to the rest of metropolitan area, Galicia, Portugal and several Spanish cities as Salamanca, Oviedo, Madrid, Bilbao, Pamplona, Zaragoza or Barcelona. Urban transit service Vitrasa connects the airport with the city center with the line 9A every 30 minutes.

=== Car ===
A close access exists from AP-9 motorway near Puxeiros road junction, connecting to the downtown, the rest of Galicia and Portugal. Travel time to the city center is around 20 minutes.

== Catchment area ==
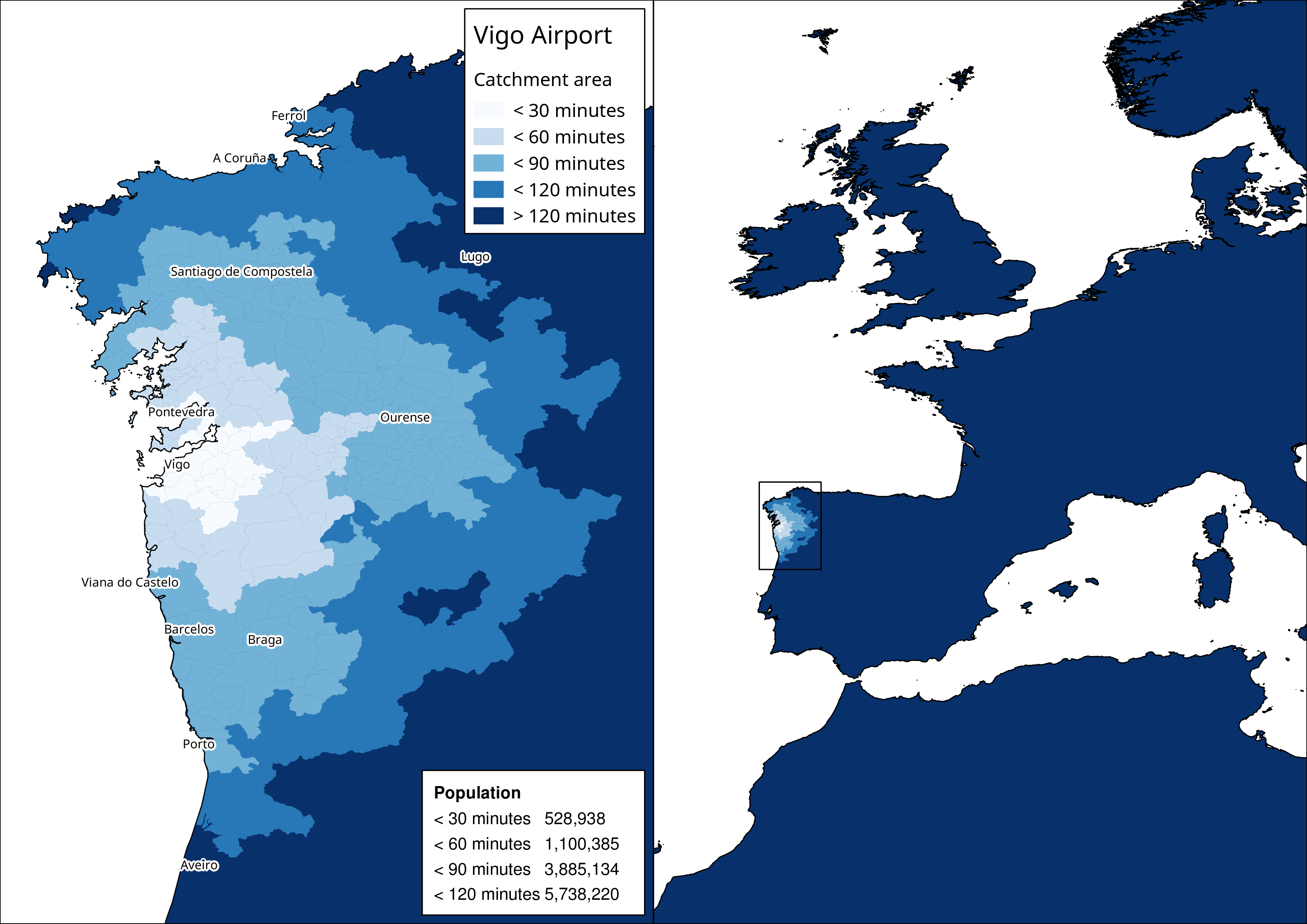
Vigo airport catchment area

Vigo airport is located in the center of the Galicia–North Portugal Euroregion. This situation together with the fact of being a well communicated airport provides it the largest catchment area of Galician airports for all isochronous, being the second one in the euroregion after Porto Airport. Besides the city of Vigo, the airport catchment area includes some touristic destinations like Pontevedra - Rías Baixas, North Portugal and Santiago de Compostela.

30 min	60 min	90 min	120 min
528,938	1,100,385	3,885,134	5,738,220
