= Albacete-Los Llanos railway station =

Railway station in Spain

Albacete-Los Llanos
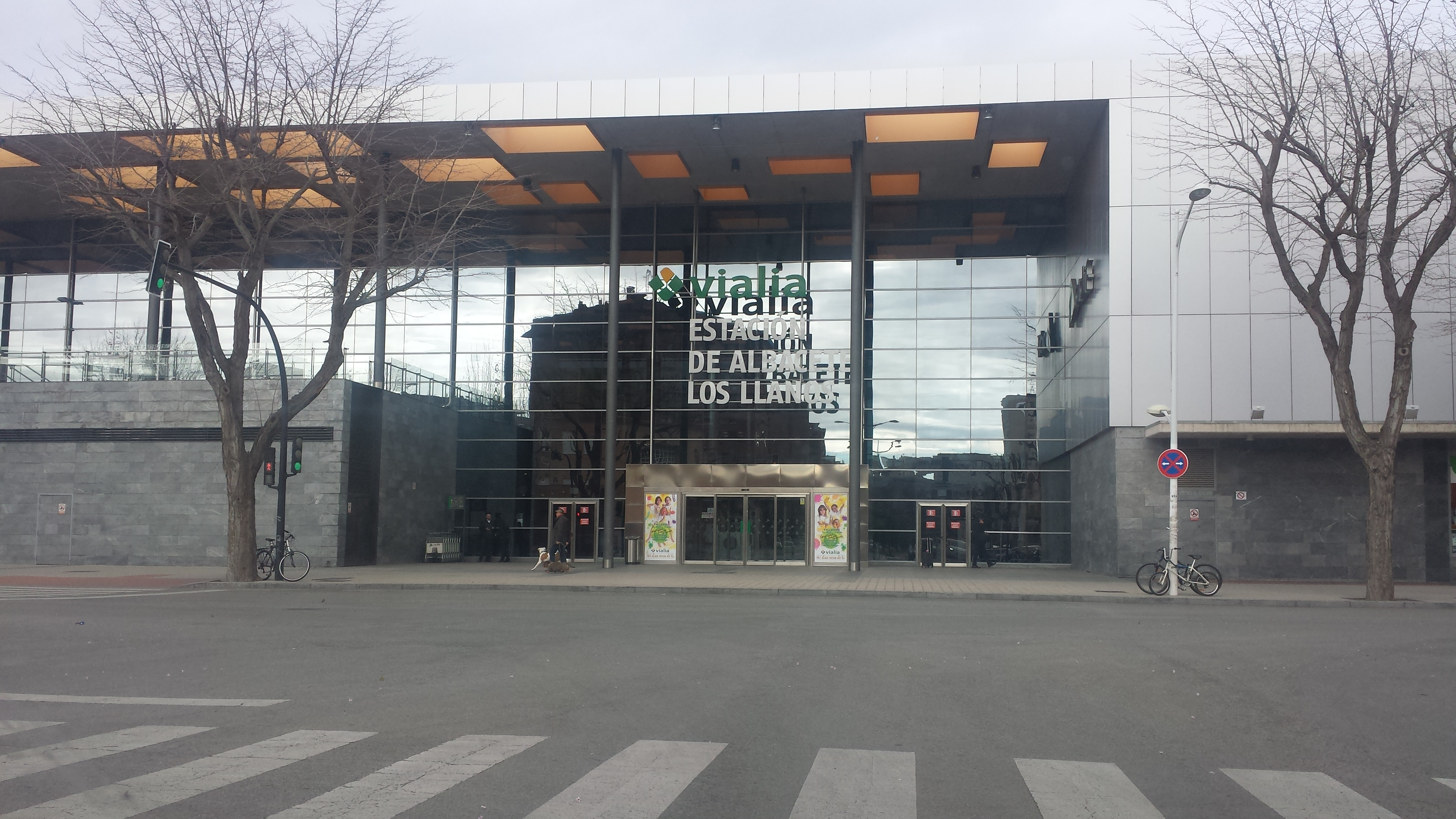
- Main entrance of station

General information
- Location: C/ Federico Garcia Lorca, Albacete, Castilla–La Mancha, 02001
- Owner: Adif
- Operator: Renfe
- Lines: Madrid–Levante high-speed rail network; Madrid–Valencia railway
- Platforms: 4

Other information
- Station code: 60600

History
- Opened: 2010

Passengers
- 2018: 915,608

Services
Preceding station	Ouigo España	Following station
Madrid Chamartín Terminus	Madrid to Alicante	Alicante Terminus
Location

Albacete-Los Llanos railway station is a railway station serving the Spanish city of Albacete, Castilla–La Mancha.

== History ==
The station was opened in 2010 replacing an older station in the city, ready for service on the AVE high-speed rail line from Madrid Atocha, which was later extended to Alicante in 2013.

== Facilities ==
Albacete-Los Llanos was designed to provide a centre for leisure, commerce and culture. Outlets in the station complex include McDonald's, a Mercadona supermarket, a Viaje El Corte Inglés department store, Juguetilandia toy store, cinema and McFit gym.

== Services ==
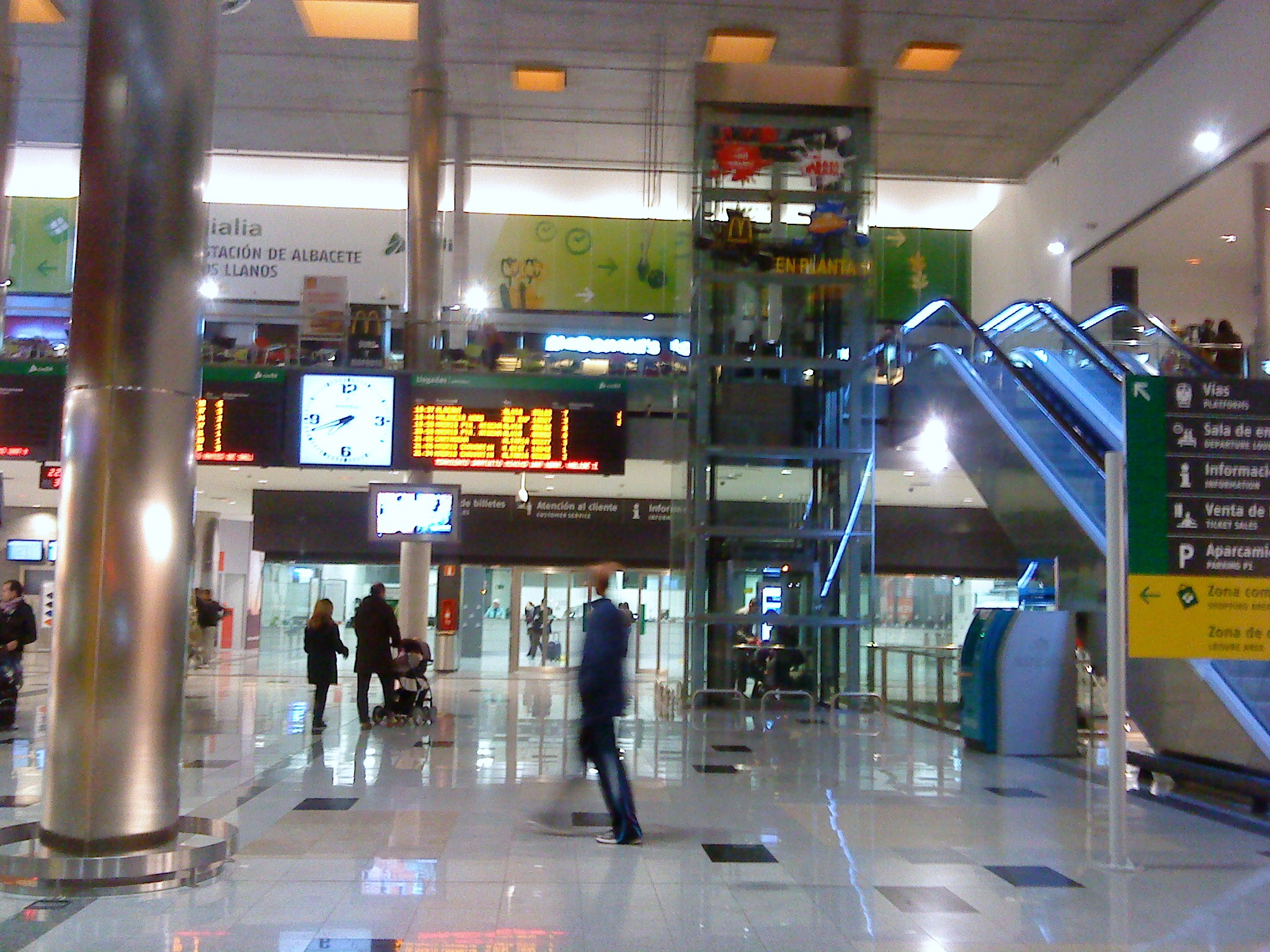
Station entrance hall

Albacete-Los Llanos is served by various rail services; AVE high-speed rail via the Madrid–Levante high-speed rail network's Alicante branch, Alvia and Altaria mixed high-speed/conventional services to northern Spain and Murcia/Cartagena and regional trains serving destinations in Castilla–La Mancha.

Preceding station	Renfe Operadora	Following station
Cuenca–Fernando Zóbel towards Madrid Chamartín	AVE	Villena AV towards Alicante
Cuenca–Fernando Zóbel towards Madrid Chamartín	AVE	Elche AV towards Murcia del Carmen
Cuenca–Fernando Zóbel towards Madrid Puerta de Atocha	AVE	Alicante towards Murcia del Carmen
Cuenca–Fernando Zóbel towards León	AVE	Alicante Terminus
Cuenca–Fernando Zóbel towards Ourense-Empalme	AVE	Alicante Terminus
Cuenca–Fernando Zóbel towards Madrid Chamartín	Avlo	Villena AV towards Alicante
Cuenca–Fernando Zóbel towards Madrid Chamartín	Avlo	Villena AV towards Murcia del Carmen
Cuenca–Fernando Zóbel towards A Coruña	Alvia	Villena AV towards Alicante
Cuenca–Fernando Zóbel towards Gijón	Alvia	Villena AV towards Alicante
Cuenca–Fernando Zóbel towards Pontevedra	Alvia	Villena AV towards Alicante
Cuenca–Fernando Zóbel towards Santander	Alvia	Villena AV towards Alicante
Xàtiva towards Barcelona Sants	Intercity	Villarrobledo towards Seville-Santa Justa
Villarrobledo towards Madrid Chamartín	Intercity	Almansa towards Valencia Nord
Villarrobledo towards Madrid Chamartín	Intercity	Hellín towards Águilas
La Gineta towards Ciudad Real	Media Distancia 45	Almansa towards Alicante
La Gineta towards Alcázar de San Juan	Media Distancia 46	Almansa towards Alicante
La Gineta towards Madrid Chamartín	Media Distancia 57	Terminus
La Roda towards Jaén	Media Distancia 61	Almansa towards Alicante
