= Redondela railway station =

Railway station in Galicia, Spain

Redondela
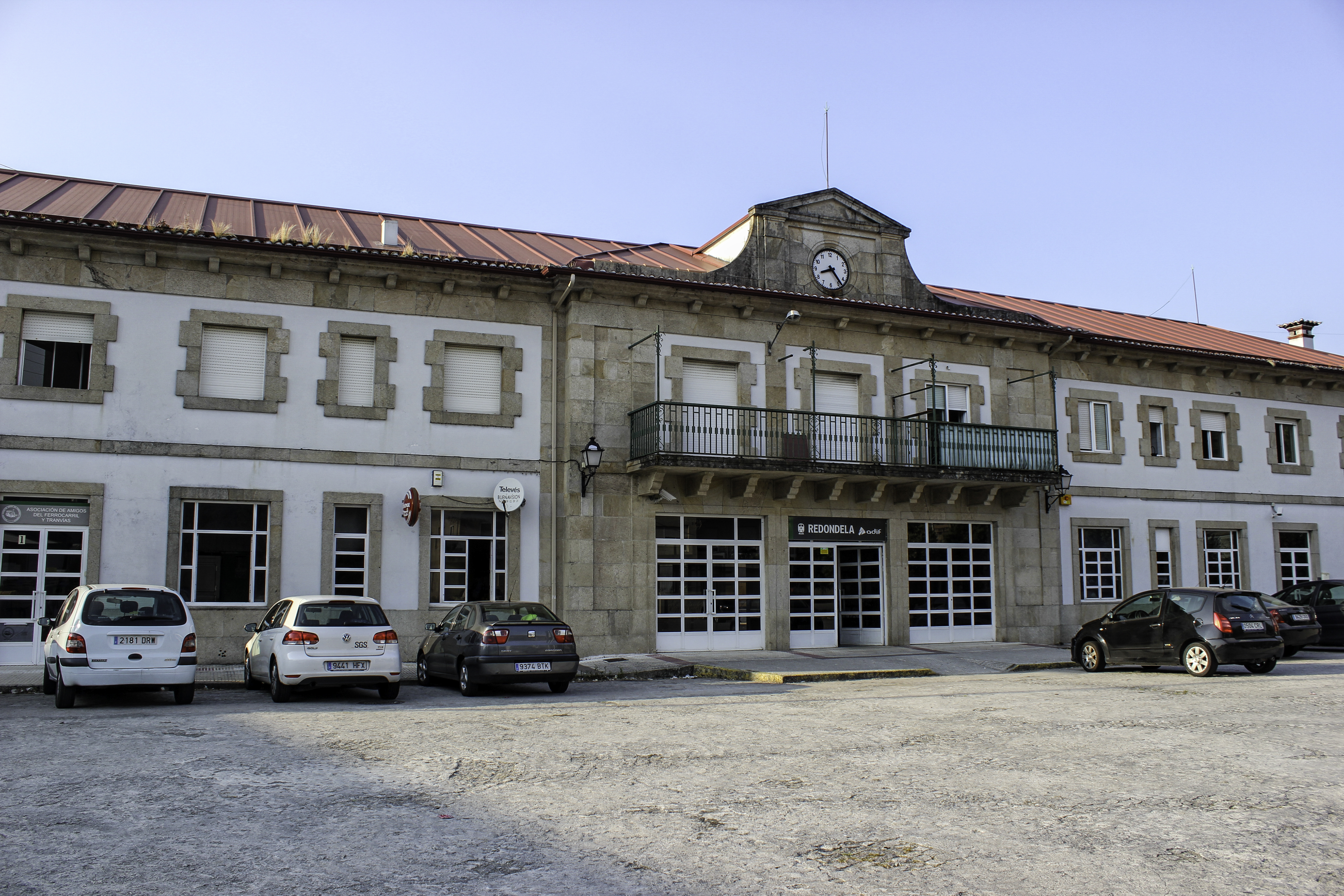
- View of the station facade.

General information
- Coordinates: 42°17′10″N 8°37′10″W
- Owner: Adif
- Operator: Renfe
- Lines: Monforte de Lemos-Vigo; Redondela-Santiago de Compostela

Passengers
- 2017: 991,383
Location

Redondela railway station is the main railway station of Redondela in Galicia, Spain. It mainly serves regional and long-distance traffic across different areas in Galicia and northern Spain in general, whereas high-speed traffic is served by the nearby Redondela AV railway station, in the outskirts of town.

== Services ==
Preceding station	Renfe Operadora	Following station
Porriño towards Barcelona Sants	Alvia	Vigo-Guixar Terminus
Guillarei towards Bilbao-Abando	Intercity	Vigo-Guixar Terminus
Porriño towards Madrid Chamartín	Intercity	Vigo-Guixar Terminus
Redondela-Picota towards A Coruña	Media Distancia 1	Vigo-Guixar Terminus
Porriño towards Valença	Media Distancia 3	Vigo-Guixar Terminus
Louredo-Valos towards León	Media Distancia 6	Vigo-Guixar Terminus
