= Ourense railway station =

Railway station in Ourense, Spain

Ourense
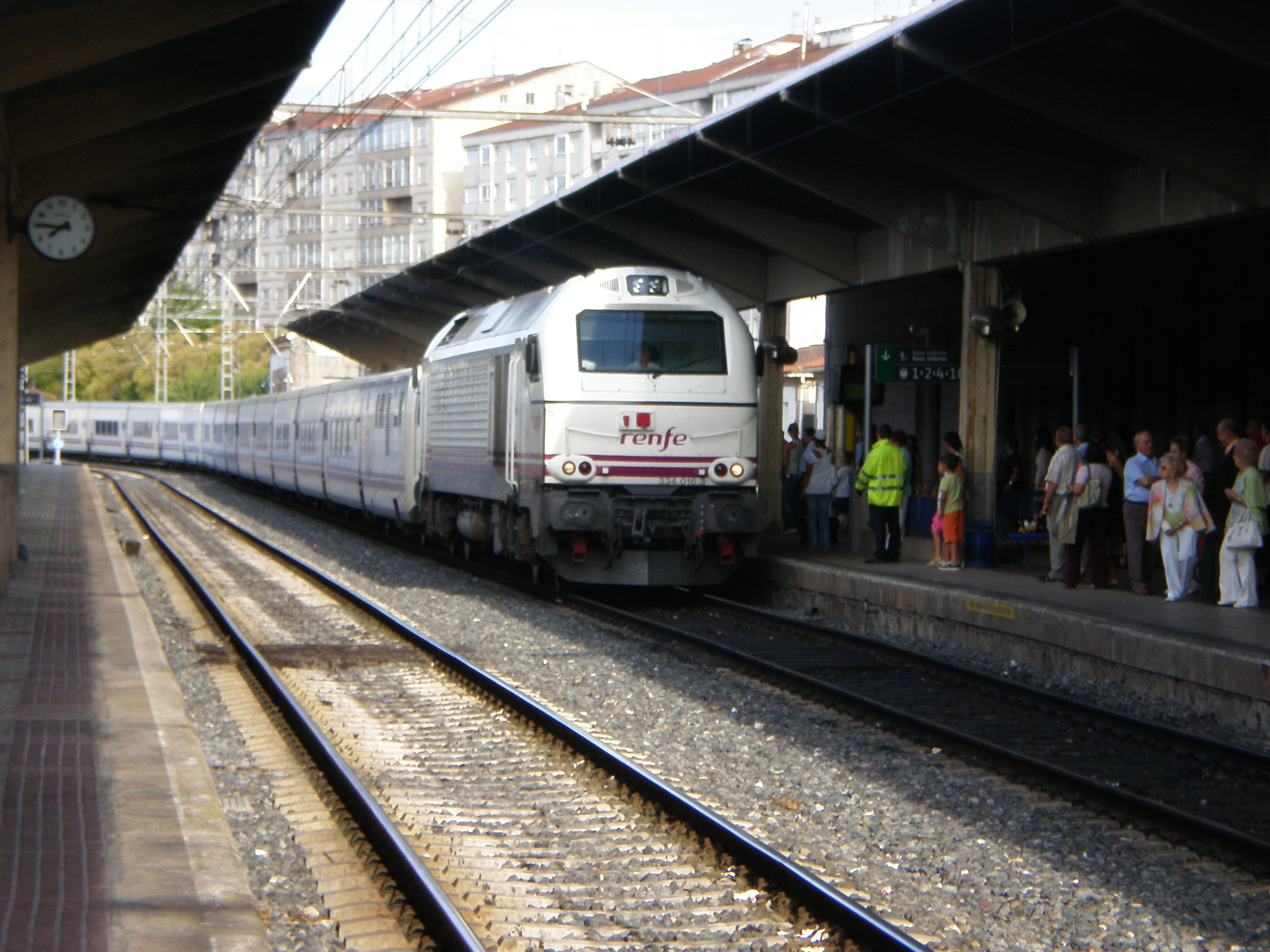
- Talgo and 334 locomotive in the station.

General information
- Coordinates: 42°21′01″N 7°52′22″W
- Owner: Adif
- Operator: Renfe
- Lines: Madrid-Galicia high-speed rail line Zamora-A Coruña; Monforte de Lemos-Vigo

Passengers
- 2023: 2.082.540
Location

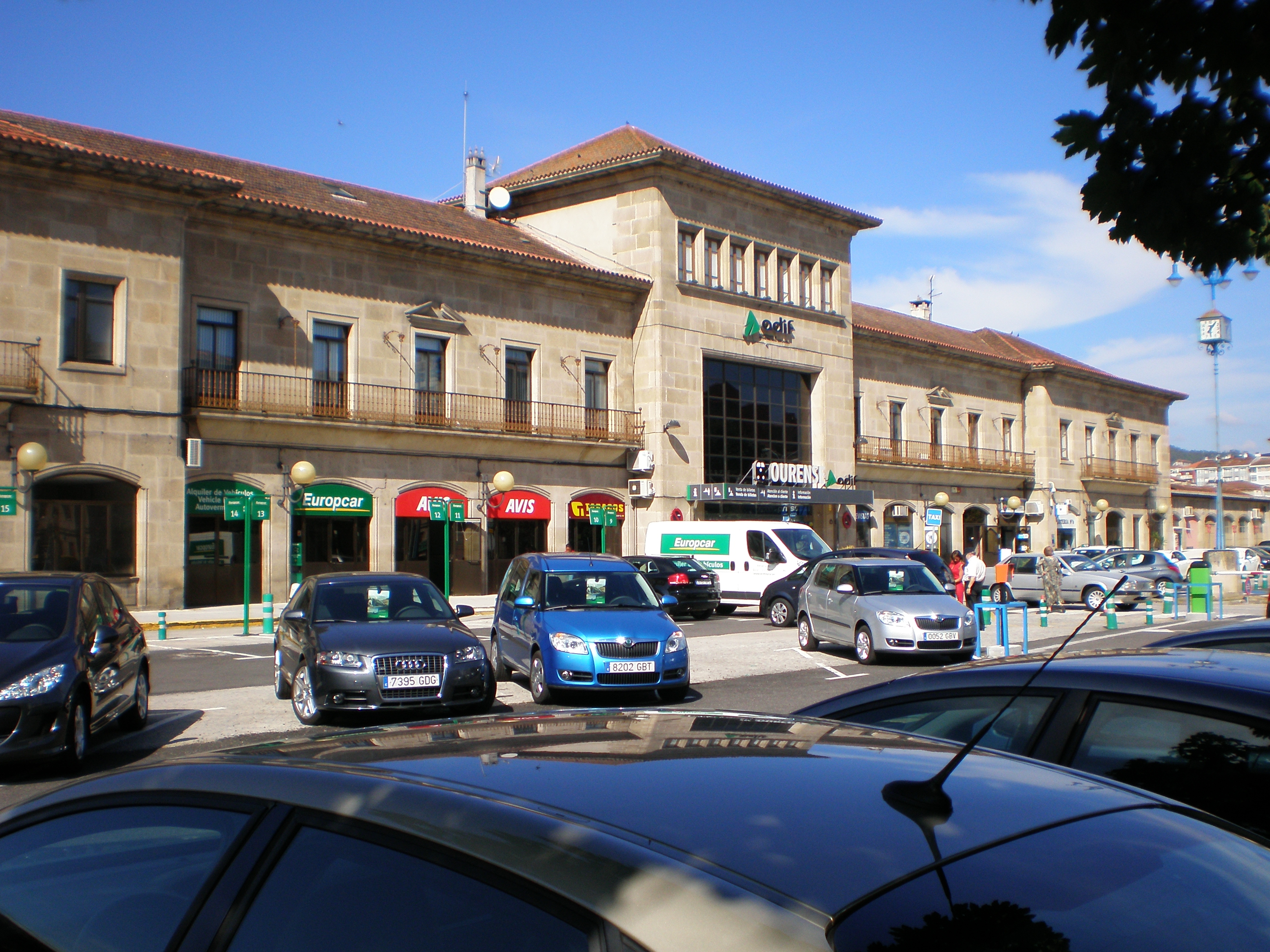
Facade of the station

Ourense railway station (IATA: OUQ), formerly known as Ourense-Empalme, is the main railway station of Ourense, Spain.

== History ==
=== Background ===
The railway arrived in the city on 18 June 1881 with the opening of the Vigo–Ourense line. The Medina–Zamora–Ourense–Vigo Railway Company (MZOV), established in 1880, was responsible for the works. In 1928, the severe financial difficulties faced by the companies operating railway lines in western Spain led the government to nationalise and merge them into the National Western Railway Company, which was, in turn, incorporated into RENFE in 1941.

The city’s first station was a modest structure located in the then independent municipality of Canedo, designed to accommodate a passenger building and the railway facilities typical of a terminus.

=== Current building ===
In 1952, with the construction of the line between Zamora and A Coruña, the current station was opened, an event attended by the then leader of Spain Francisco Franco.

It was historically named Ourense-Empalme to distinguish it from the city’s other railway station, Ourense-San Francisco. In 2020, following the closure of the San Francisco station, it was renamed simply “Ourense”.

Since 2021, it has been part of the Madrid–Galicia high-speed rail line.

== Services ==
Preceding station	Renfe Operadora	Following station
Zamora towards Madrid Chamartín	AVE	Terminus
Zamora towards Alicante	AVE	Terminus
A Gudiña-Porta de Galicia towards Madrid Chamartín	Alvia	Santiago de Compostela towards Ferrol
A Gudiña-Porta de Galicia towards Madrid Chamartín	Alvia	Monforte de Lemos towards Lugo
A Gudiña-Porta de Galicia towards Madrid Chamartín	Alvia	Santiago de Compostela towards Pontevedra
A Gudiña-Porta de Galicia towards Madrid Chamartín	Alvia	Pontevedra towards Vigo-Urzáiz
Monforte de Lemos towards Hendaye	Intercity	Carballino towards A Coruña
Monforte de Lemos towards Bilbao-Abando	Intercity	Guillarei towards Vigo-Guixar
Monforte de Lemos towards Madrid Chamartín	Intercity	Barbantes towards Vigo-Guixar
Terminus	Avant	Santiago de Compostela towards A Coruña
Ourense-San Francisco towards Puebla de Sanabria	Media Distancia 2	Terminus
Terminus	Media Distancia 4	Monforte de Lemos towards A Coruña
Os Peares towards León	Media Distancia 6	Barbantes towards Vigo-Guixar
