= Linha do Minho =

Railway line in Portugal

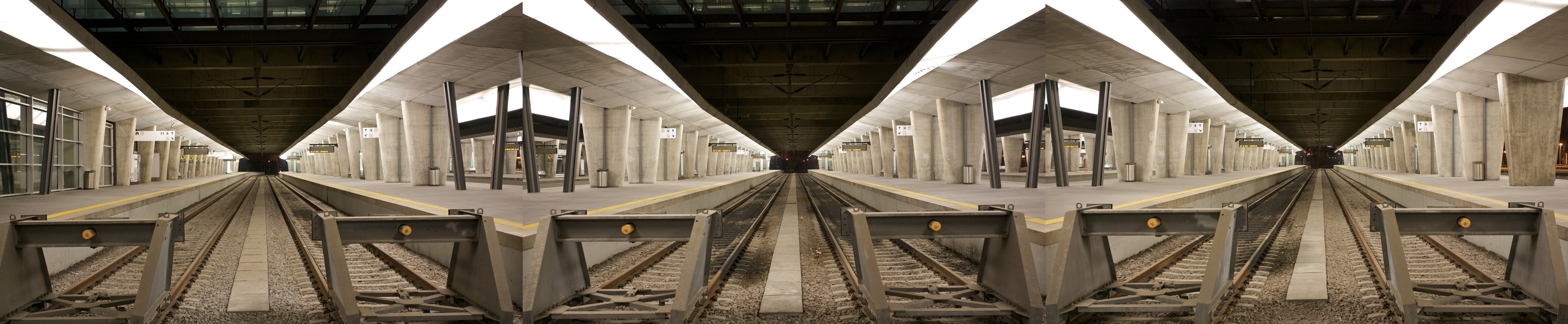
- Linha do Minho in Porto-Campanhã.

Overview
- Status: Operational
- Owner: Infraestruturas de Portugal
- Termini: Porto-São Bento; Valença

Technical
- Line length: 133.6 km (83.0 mi)
- Track gauge: 1,668 mm (5 ft 5 21/32 in) Iberian gauge
- Electrification: 25 kV / 50 kHz Overhead line
Route map

Location on the network
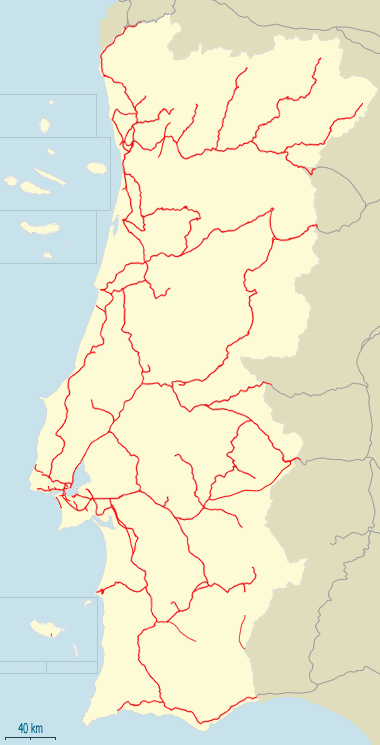

+ Porto-S. B. × Monção (🔎)

Linha do Minho is a railway line which connects the stations of Porto-São Bento and Valença, in Portugal. It was opened on 6 August 1882, when it reached Valença. The section from Valença to Monção was opened on 15 July 1915 and closed on 31 December 1989. From its Valença terminal, there is a rail connection to Tui just across the Spanish border; Renfe operates through trains between Vigo and Porto-Campanhã.

== See also ==
- List of railway lines in Portugal
- List of Portuguese locomotives and railcars
- History of rail transport in Portugal
