= Monforte de Lemos railway station =

Railway station in Spain

Monforte de Lemos
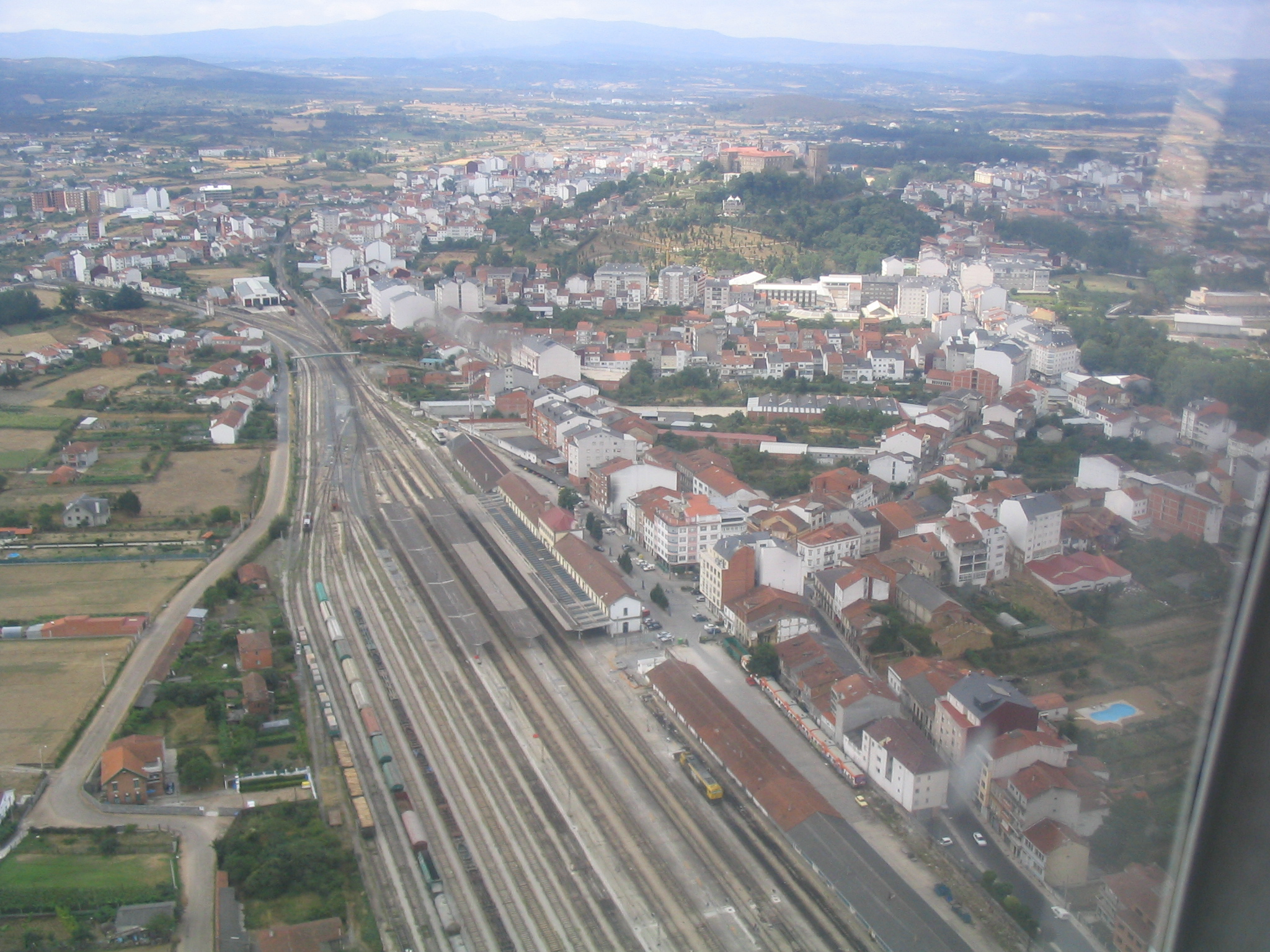
- Aerial view of the station.

General information
- Coordinates: 42°21′01″N 7°52′22″W
- Owner: Adif
- Operator: Renfe
- Lines: León-A Coruña; Monforte de Lemos-Vigo

Passengers
- 2017: 991,383
Location

Monforte de Lemos Railway Station (IATA: MDL) is the main railway station of Monforte de Lemos in Galicia, Spain.

== Services ==
Preceding station	Renfe Operadora	Following station
Ourense-Empalme towards Madrid Chamartín	Alvia	Sarria towards Lugo
San Clodio-Quiroga towards Barcelona Sants	Alvia	Ourense-Empalme towards A Coruña
San Clodio-Quiroga towards Barcelona Sants	Alvia	Ourense-Empalme towards Vigo-Guixar
San Clodio-Quiroga towards Hendaye	Intercity	Ourense-Empalme towards A Coruña
San Clodio-Quiroga towards Bilbao-Abando	Intercity	Ourense-Empalme towards Vigo-Guixar
San Clodio-Quiroga towards Madrid Chamartín	Intercity	Ourense-Empalme towards Vigo-Guixar
Ourense-Empalme Terminus	Media Distancia 4	Sarria towards A Coruña
A Pobra do Brollón towards León	Media Distancia 6	Canabal towards Vigo-Guixar
A Pobra do Brollón towards León	Media Distancia 23	Terminus
