= Ramal Internacional de Valença =

Portuguese railway line

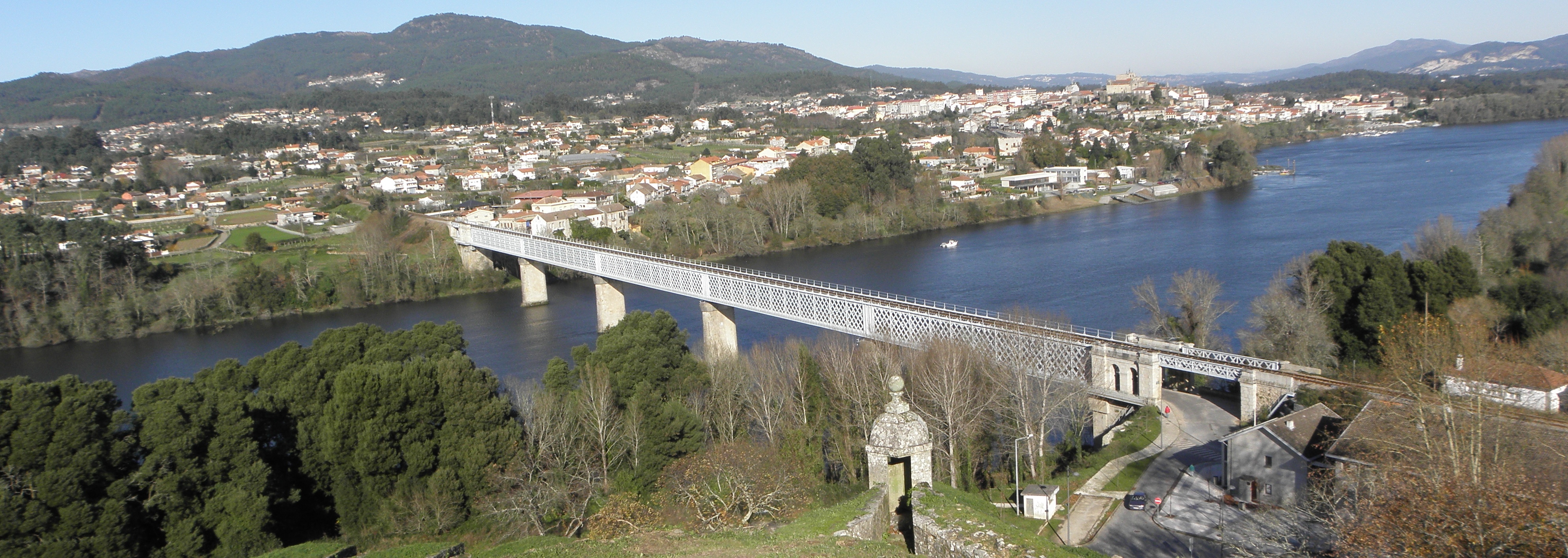
- Tui International Bridge

Overview
- Status: Operational
- Termini: Valença; Guillarei

Technical
- Line length: 14.8 km (9.2 mi)
- Track gauge: 1,668 mm (5 ft 5 21/32 in) Iberian gauge
Route map
Location on the network

Ramal Internacional de Valença is an international railway line which connects the stations of Valença, in Portugal, and Guillarei, in Galicia (Spain). It was opened on 25 March 1886.

== See also ==
- List of railway lines in Portugal
- History of rail transport in Portugal
