= Juguetilandia =

Spanish retail company

- Company type: Limited liability company.
- Industry: Buying and selling toys
- Headquarters: Calle Alfaz del Pi 11. 1º Finestrat (Alicante) - Spain
- Products: Pools, Toys, Toys y Childcare
- Brands: Model movil (Small size toy vehicles, child radio control vehicles), Natur Play (Traditional wooden toys), NY Fashion toys (Handicrafts, toy utensils for the home), Pelucheto (Plushes), Pequebanda (Musical toys and instruments), Rider trike (Big size toy vehicles), Piccolo toys y Cuore baby (Childcare), Twinah, Xhary y Cocosito (Dolls), Xturnos (Board games, strategy games), Bricodedos (Handicrafts and molding), Coleprofe (School supplies), Disonil (Costumes); Deportoys, Diverbeach and Divergarden Outdoor products, pool, camping and garden.
- Number of employees: ▲200 (2015)
- Subsidiaries: Juguetilandia Junior
- Website: juguetilandia.com (e-commerce Spain) juguetilandia.fr (e-commerce France) juguetilandia.be (e-commerce Belgium) juguetilandia.lu (e-commerce Luxembourg) juguetessomosnosotros.com (Oficial Blog Juguetilandia (Spanish))

Juguetilandia is a Spanish company dedicated to the marketing of toys, costumes, gifts, outdoor and beach products whose headquarters is located in Finestrat (Alicante). The company has more than 50 retail outlets spread throughout Spain as well as its own E-commerce website.

== Origins and history ==
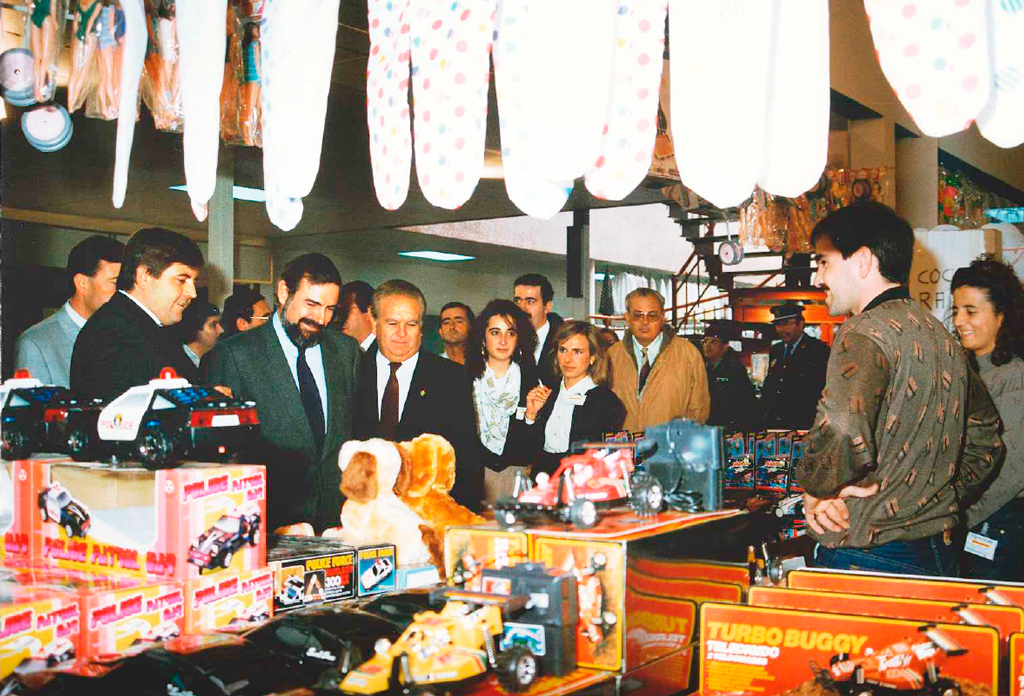
The beginnings of Juguetilandia

The family Pastor, consisting of four siblings coming from the industrial village of Onil in the Province of Alicante, started its journey in the sector in the 1970s. The entrepreneurial spirit of Agustín Pastor Beneyto focused on several weekly marketplaces located in many Valencian towns. Every day, in a different place of the Valencian Community, Agustín and his sons strived to offer and sell a large variety of dolls, toys and games which were made in the 'Toy Valley'- inland region which include the villages of Ibi, Castalla and Onil-, from where the family left at dawn every day. Besides these traditional marketplaces which took place every morning, the family Pastor spent the afternoons negotiating at different wholesalers growing to more than 1000 customers spread from the Costa Dorada to La Manga del Mar Menor.

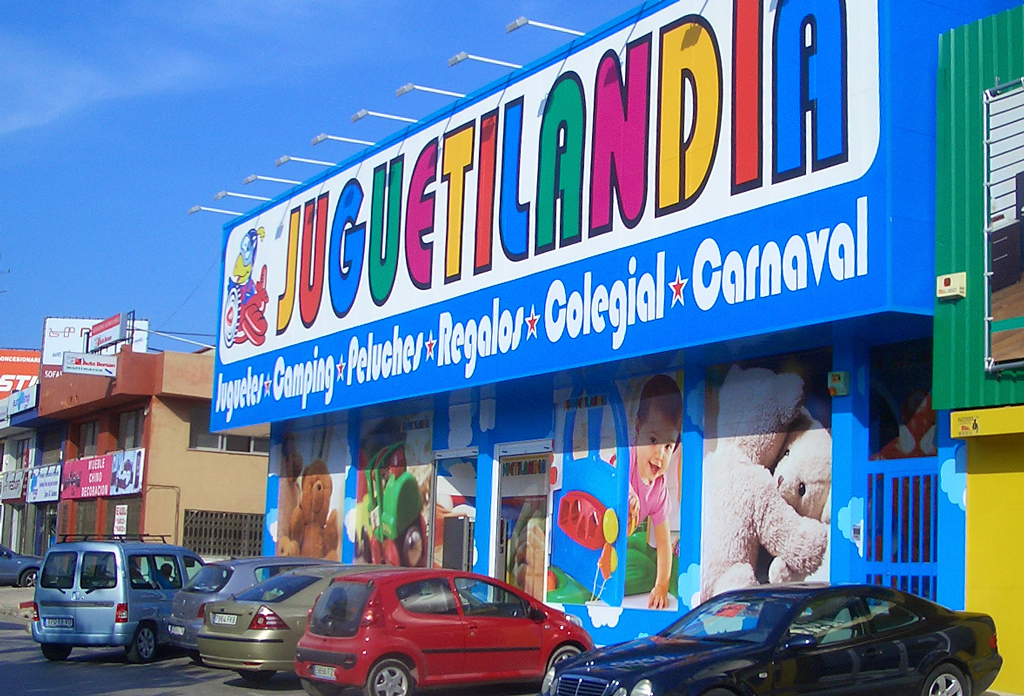
The first Juguetilandia shop

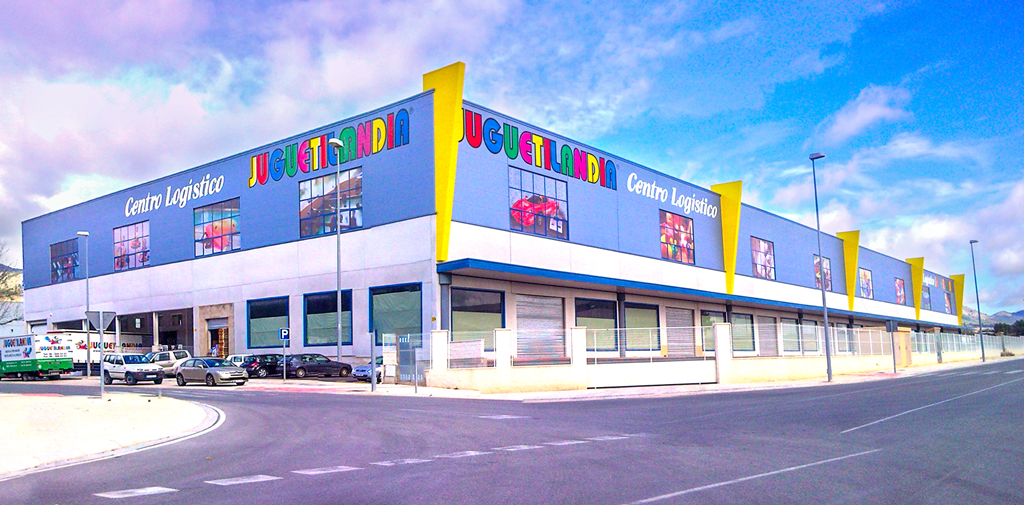
Warehouse in Onil

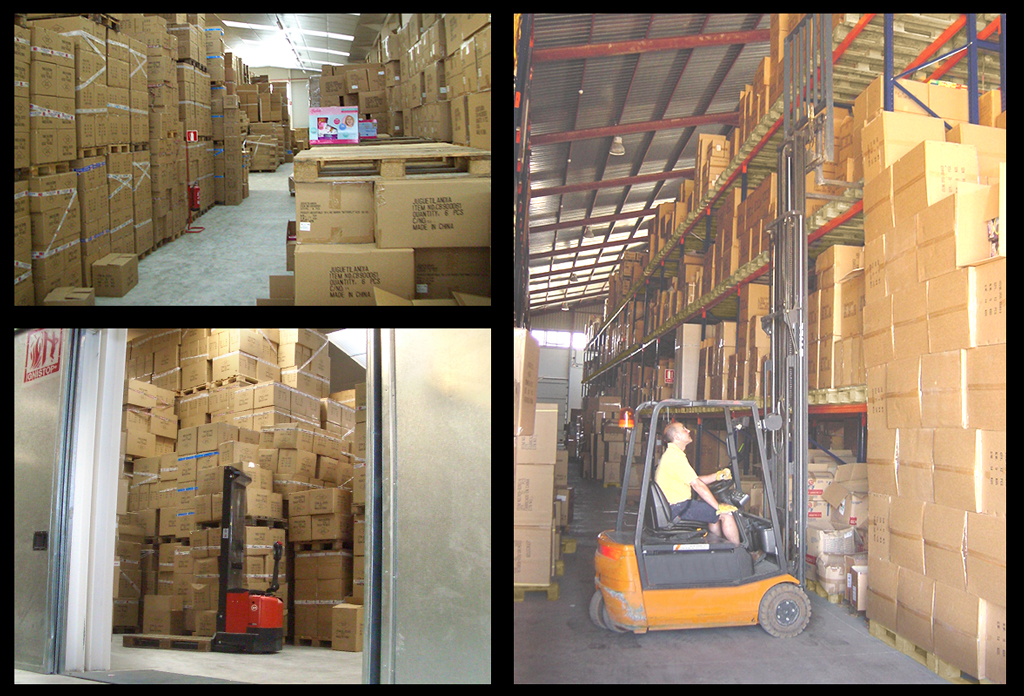
Indoor view of warehouse

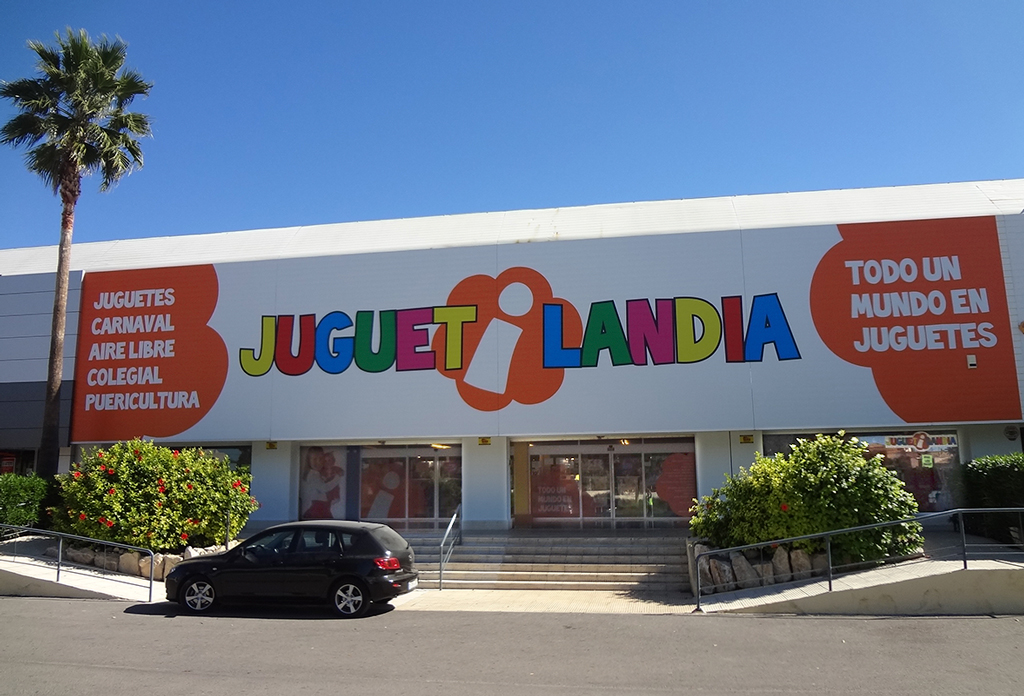
Facade of Juguetilandia shop in San Juan

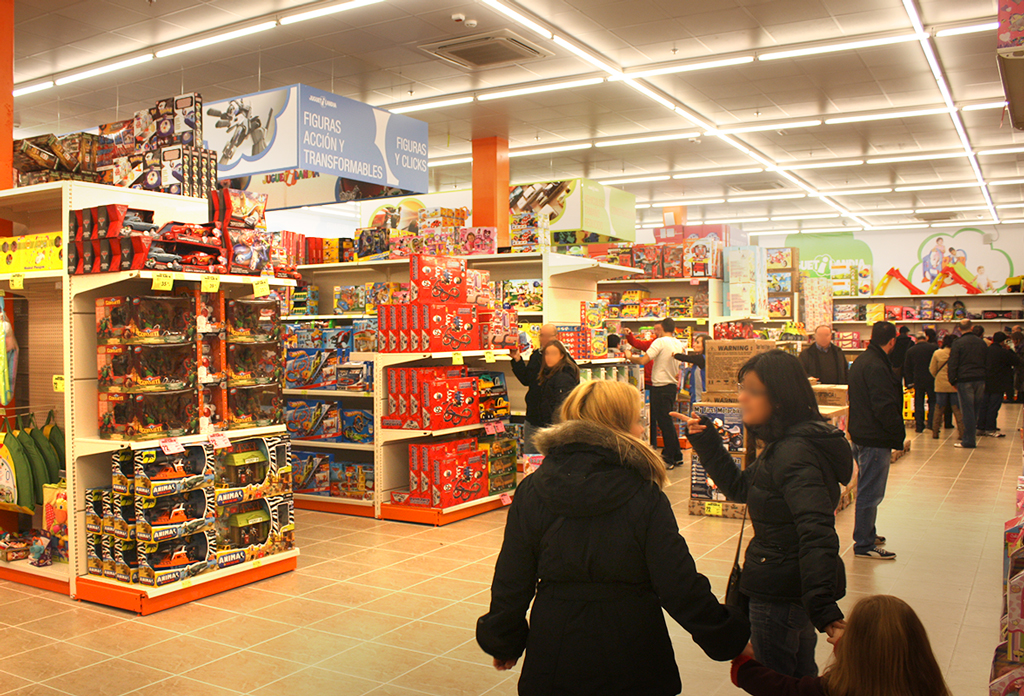
Indoor view of Juguetilandia shop in Albacete

In the mid-1980s, during the Christmas campaign every December, this business began to focus on temporary shops, which now represents the core concept of Juguetilandia to meet the Christmas demand. In 1987, the first Juguetilandia store was opened in Altea, Alicante, which led to a business model focused on fixed physical points of sale, large surfaces identifiable under the same distinctive logo "JUGUETILANDIA".

The expansion continued in the early 1990s along the Costa Blanca, establishing stores in Denia, Elche, Benidorm, Torrevieja, Calpe and Gandia. In the late 1990s and during the early 2000s the company decided to expand beyond Valencian borders and continue its growth throughout mainland Spain, with new openings in different regions such as Catalonia, Murcia, Andalusia, Madrid, Castile and León, Castilla La Mancha and Aragon. All this expansion led Juguetilandia to win several awards such as 'The entrepreneur's award' of La Foia de Castalla in 2011.

In 2015, Juguetilandia opened new stores in Granada, San Sebastián de los Reyes, Don Benito, Mérida, Sagunto and Dos Hermanas, reaching 50 stores.

Since 2006 the main warehouse which is 15,000 m^{2}, from where the goods are stored and distributed to all the establishments is located in Onil (Alicante).

== Franchise ==
Since 2013, Juguetilandia has decided to focus on a new business model that enables young and new entrepreneurs to establish their own Juguetilandia franchise. Franchises are offered in two store formats:

- Juguetilandia Junior shops with surfaces between 100 m^{2} and 400 m^{2},
- Juguetilandia shops with surfaces of more than 400 m^{2}.

=== Franchising Master ===
Currently Juguetilandia has its network of physical stores in Spain but has programs to expand its business model to other European countries, where it is already selling toys through its website. Among the most interesting destinations of the brand in addition to European countries, are Latin American countries such as Colombia, Chile, Peru, where it already has trade delegations.

== E-Commerce ==
The new 'virtual' tendency and the growing demand in the online world, led to Juguetilandia.com's presence on the internet in 2008, enabling it to reach out to the entire Spanish territory. In 2014, Juguetilandia.com crossed the Spanish borders delivering orders to countries like France, Luxembourg, Belgium, Italy, Germany and England in a maximum delivery time of 72 hours.

In 2013 and 2014 Juguetilandia.com won the 'E-Commerce award' for the best virtual store dedicated to Toys and Hobbies in Spain.

== Geographical Presence of Juguetilandia ==
Actually,

- Spain: 50
  - Andalusia (11):Andújar, Armilla, Jerez de la Frontera, Córdoba, Granada, Huelva, Jerez de la Frontera, Málaga, Pulianas, Roquetas de mar, Tomares and Dos Hermanas.
  - Aragon (1): Zaragoza.
  - Castilla-La Mancha (2): Albacete, Ciudad Real.
  - Castile and León (1): Zamora.
  - Catalonia (1): Terrassa.
  - Extremadura (4): Don Benito (2), Mérida, Plasencia.
  - Community of Madrid (5): Alcalá de Henares, Collado Villalba, Getafe, Parla, San Sebastián de los Reyes.
  - Region of Murcia (4): Cartagena, Lorca, Murcia y Puerto de Mazarrón.
  - Valencian Community (21): Alicante, Altea, Cocentaina, Denia, Elche (3), Finestrat, Orihuela, Petrer, Rojales, San Juan, San Vicente del Raspeig, Torrevieja, Alfafar, Campanar, Cullera, Gandía, Xàtiva, Port de Sagunt.

== Own brands ==
Currently, Juguetilandia sells its entire range of products under a number of registered trademarks fulfilling children's safety and quality standards. These brands are:

- Model movil: Small size toy vehicles, child radio control vehicles, car tracks, parkings and garages.
- Natur play: Board and skill games, handicrafts, drawing and painting, camping accessories and construction toys. A line of traditional wooden toys.
- Ny fashion toys: Handicrafts, toy utensils for the home, beauty, party goods and costume accessories that will delight children and adolescents.
- Pelucheto: Plushes, animals and pets, musical and chatty plushes, childcare, walking and resting imitation products.
- Pequebanda: Musical toys and instruments.
- Rider trike: Big size toy vehicles, without pedals or with electric motor.
- Piccolo toys: Childcare and toys for babies, initiation and imitation, small size toy vehicles, early childhood radiocontrol, interactive games, musical and electronic toys.
- Twinah: Dolls with and without mechanism, different sizes and features
- Xhary: Dolls and mannequins.
- Xturnos: Board games, memory and observation, strategy, words and numbers games, skill games, games of chance and shooting games.
- Bricodedos: Handicrafts and molding, toy utensils for the home, professions, household, construction toys and assemblies.
- Coleprofe: School supplies, blackboards and desks, handicrafts and molding, outdoor products, big size toy houses, slides, electronics and computers, interactive games, drawing and painting, construction toys and assemblies, childcare and toys for the baby.
- Cucosito: Dolls with and without mechanism, doll houses, doll's accessories.
- Cuore baby: Adult products for children's childcare, walking and resting.
- Depor toys: Outdoor products, games and toys for swimming pools and gardens, sport toys and accessories, big size toy vehicles and vehicles without pedals, skates and accessories, shooting games.
- Disonil: Party supplies and accessories, costumes for babies.
- Diver beach: Outdoor products, beach and garden, inflatables and swimming, outdoor games, games for pools.
- Diver garden: Outdoor products and big size toy houses, slides and kites.
- Imitoys: Scientific games, toy utensils for home and professions, household and experience-based toys.
