= Galicia–North Portugal Euroregion =

Region in Spain and Portugal

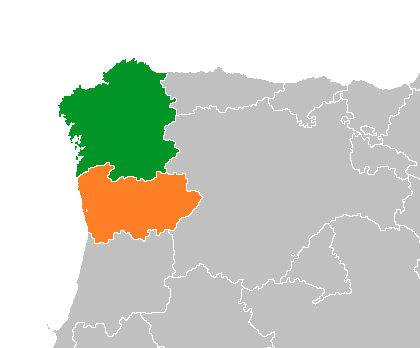

The Galicia–North Portugal Euroregion (Galician: Eurorrexión Galicia-Norte de Portugal; Portuguese: Eurorregião da Galiza-Norte de Portugal) is a cross-border Euroregion straddling Galicia (Spain) and the North Region (Portugal). It was established in 2008.

This inter-regional co-operative effort has been shaped and justified both by the economic potential of cooperation between nearby northern Portuguese and Galician industrial core cities, as well as by historical, cultural and ethnolinguistic ties.

== History ==
Economic, political, cultural and societal ties can be traced back at least to the late Bronze Age, the pre-Roman Castro Culture evidencing a shared identity and heritage across this region before the Romanization of northwestern Iberia.

With the Romanization of these societies, their shared identity was somewhat reflected through the geo-culturally explained extension of the Roman province of Gallaecia. These far west populations tepidly and gradually adapted to the manners and modus vivendi of the Romans, in what some historians consider to be a peaceful co-habitation of different social realities. The lack of severe conflicts between the two different identities assured a relatively suitable cultural transition to the Middle Ages. In the Early and High Middle Ages successive kingdoms, all of them related to the northwestern Christian Kingdoms that evolved during the early stages of the Reconquista, replaced one another depending on the location of the kingdom's seat, and the North of Portugal and Galicia eventually formed the Kingdom of Galicia. Similarly, Galicia and the north of Portugal remained a cultural and social fairly well defined continuum.

However, by the 9th century the political unity of both territories already started to fade when the title of count was given to the nobleman Vímara Peres by Alfonso III of Asturias after his successful campaign in the reconquest of Portus Cale (Porto). This began a period of political fragmentation for both territories, leading to the formation of the County of Portugal, (later elevated to the independent Kingdom of Portugal.)

Aside from this political division of interests, during this period the Galician-Portuguese language was shared on both sides of the Minho River, and became an established literary language. This shared vernacular of became one of the most important lyrical and literary languages of Europe and was taken in great regard by the neighboring Castilian royal court, with works such as Cantigas de Santa Maria, the Martín Codax's Pergaminho Vindel and the Cancioneiro da Ajuda being written during this period.

Moving into the Late Middle Ages the cultural and political division between the two territories increased, a process which reached its climax with the rise of the modern Spanish and Portuguese nation states, (with regional identity and language suppressed under Francoist Spain in particular). Nevertheless, throughout this time of in one respect increasing division, and despite the territorial expansion of Portugal up to the Algarve, both Galicia and the north of Portugal remained closely related from both a sociocultural and bioclimatic point of view. Similarly, the Portuguese cities of Porto and Braga, two of the most populated and Ancient urban areas of Portugal, are located quite close to the Galician nearby cities of Vigo and Pontevedra and in a certain way represent a continuation of the moderate south–north conurbation that leads up to the medieval pilgrimage destiny and quintessentially Galician city of Santiago de Compostela. A moderate industrialization of both regions during the 19th and early 20th centuries led to dissemination of the rural populations, especially high in Galicia by Spanish standards.

In the late 20th and early 21st centuries, democratisation, the move away from fascism in both Spain and Portugal, and their membership into the European Union, have led to both an increased potential for and an increased desire for cross-border cooperation. Similarly, industrial and economic improvements have led to an increasing exchange of services and benefits between them, as with the rest of the union members. In the particular case of Galicia and the north of Portugal, their prevalent social ties and cultural resemblance, along with demand for a mutual and strengthened infrastructure and city-based economies, creates a demand for better transport services and connections between neighboring cities like Vigo or Porto, as well as other agreements of a diverse nature, such as cultural and educational exchanges, bilateral political strategies, and ethnogastronomic accords. The Euroregion domain that conjoins both the North of Portugal and Galicia attempts to promote such achievements.
