= Celta (train) =

International train service between Porto, Portugal and Vigo, Spain

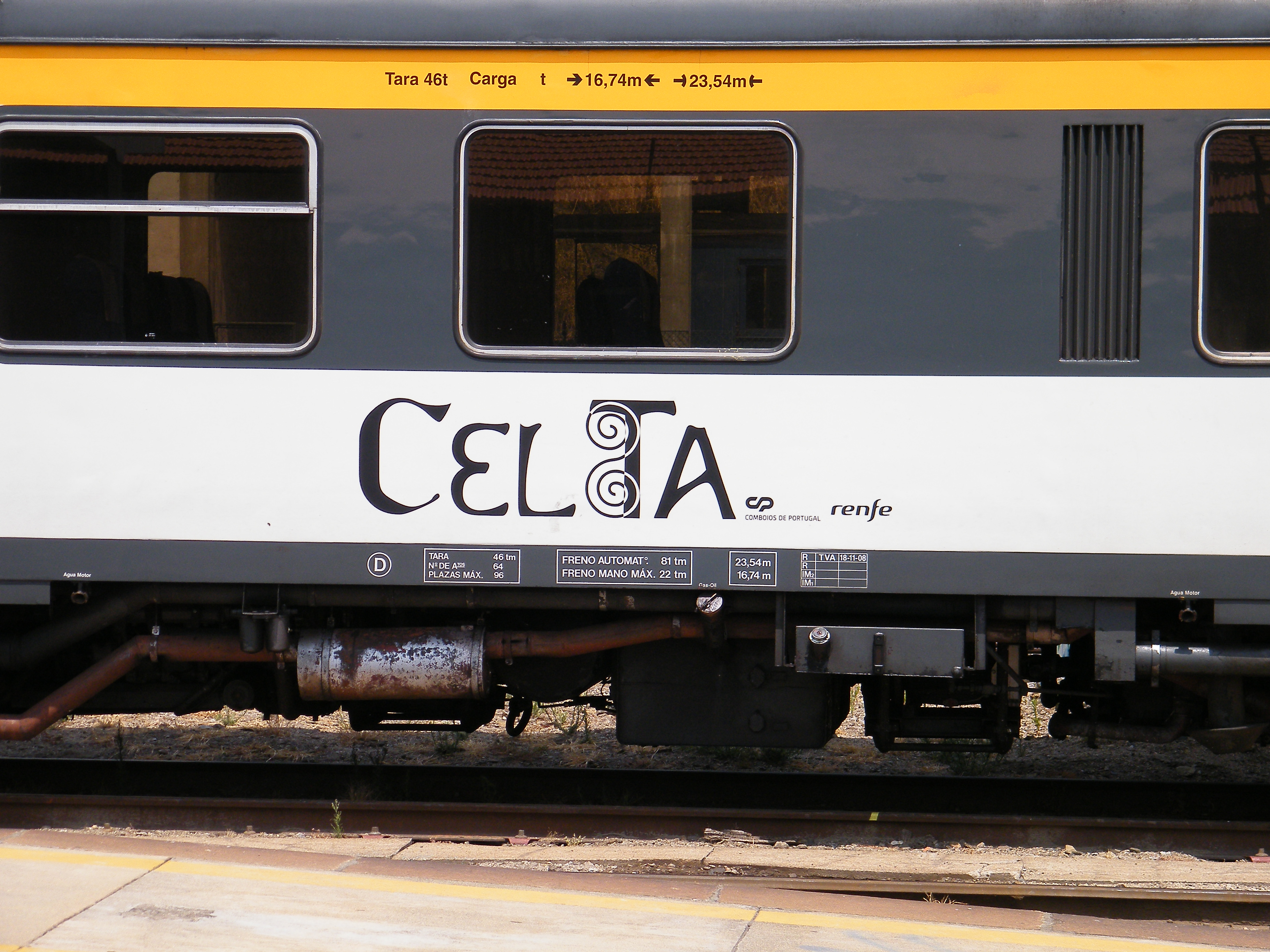
Logo of the service on a Renfe Class 592 unit

The Celta is a train connection from the Portuguese railway operator Comboios de Portugal and the Spanish railway operator Renfe Operadora between Campanhã railway station in Porto (Portugal) and Vigo-Guixar railway station in Vigo (Spain). It is one of only two international rail services between Portugal and Spain, along with the regional train between Badajoz and Entroncamento.

The service runs twice every day in each direction, taking 2 hours and 20 minutes to connect both cities.
