= Valença railway station =

Railway station in Portugal

Valença
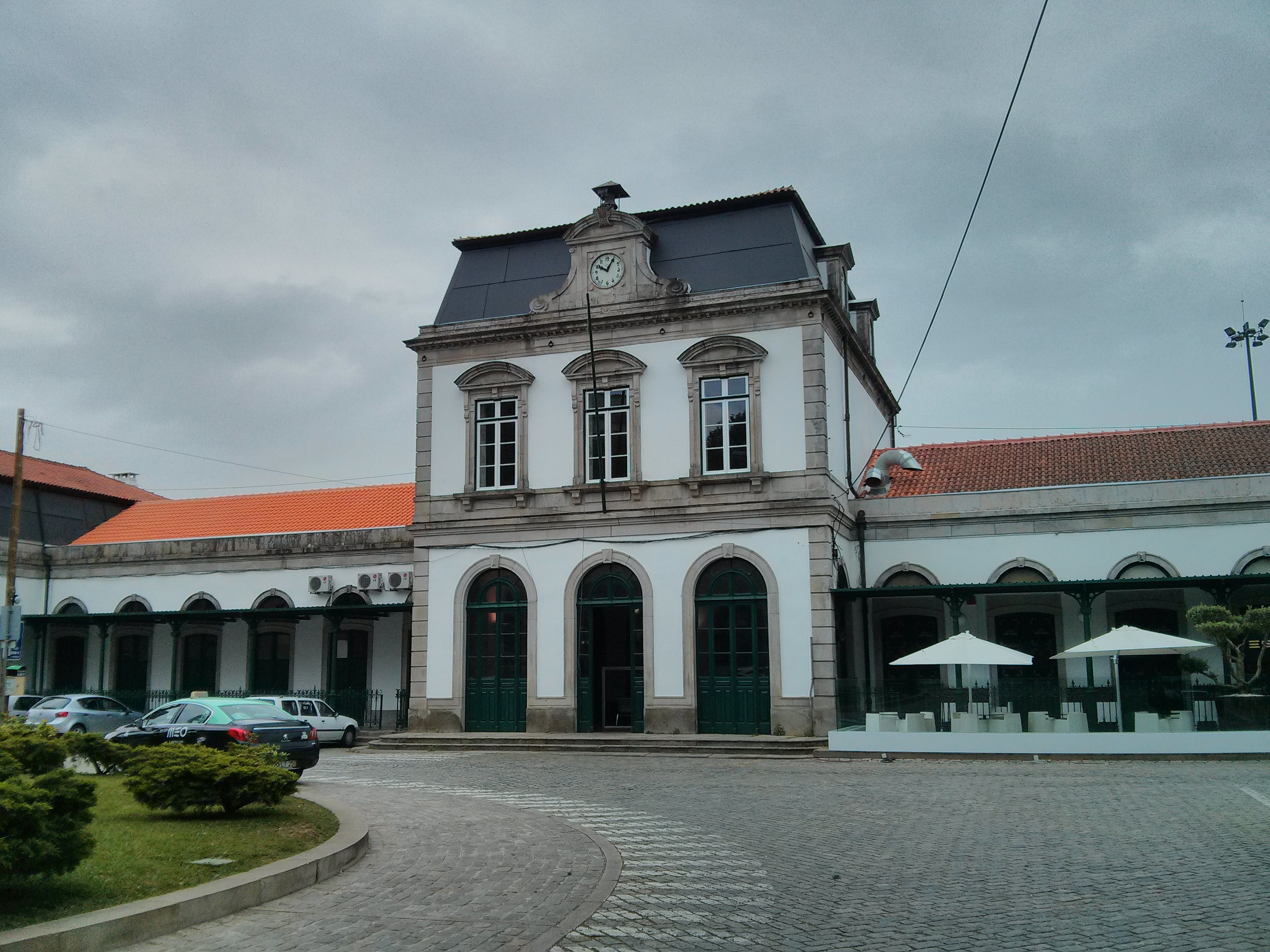
- Station facade

General information
- Coordinates: 42°21′01″N 7°52′22″W
- Operator: Comboios de Portugal
- Lines: Linha do Minho; Ramal Valença-Guillarei

Passengers
- 2017: 991,383

Services
Preceding station	Comboios de Portugal	Following station
Viana do Castelo towards Porto-Campanhã	Celta International Service	Vigo-Guixar Terminus
Vila Nova de Cerveira towards Lisbon-Santa Apolónia	Intercidades	Terminus
Vila Nova de Cerveira towards Porto-São Bento	InterRegional	Terminus
Vila Nova de Cerveira towards Porto-Campanhã	InterRegional	Terminus
Vila Nova de Cerveira towards Figueira da Foz	InterRegional	Terminus
São Pedro da Torre towards Viana do Castelo	Regional	Terminus
Location

Valença railway station is the main railway station of Valença in the Norte Region, Portugal. It mainly serves regional and long-distance traffic towards Porto and northern Portugal, as well as connecting local services across the border to Galicia, Spain.
