= Vigo-Urzáiz railway station =

Railway terminus in Vigo, Spain

Vigo-Urzáiz
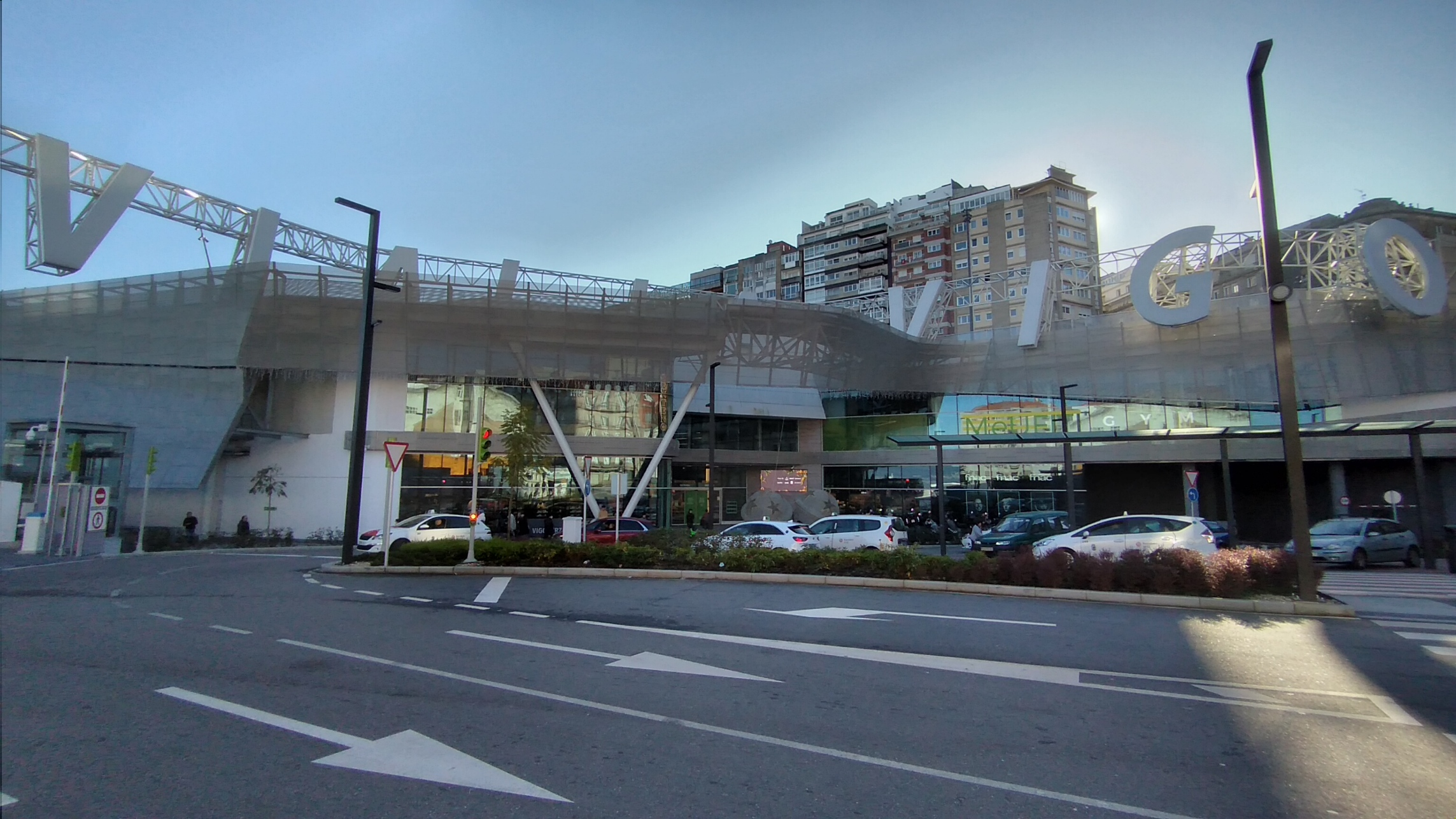
- Entrance to Vigo-Urzáiz railway station and Vialia Vigo shopping centre

General information
- Location: Praza da Estación, Vigo
- Coordinates: 42.234257°N 8.713612°W
- Owner: Adif
- Line: Atlantic Axis high-speed rail line
- Platforms: 3
- Tracks: 6

Construction
- Structure type: At-grade
- Accessible: yes
- Architect: Thom Mayne

Other information
- Station code: 22303

History
- Opened: 1878 (First station); 1987 (Second station); 2015 (Third station)

Passengers
- 2018: 787,182
Location

Vigo railway station, also known as Vigo-Urzáiz, is a railway terminus in Vigo, Spain. It provides high speed train connection through the Atlantic Axis high-speed rail line with main Galician cities as Pontevedra, Santiago de Compostela and A Coruña every hour. The station is directly connected through the bus stop in Urzaiz street (50 m from the station hall) with the Airport (line 9A) and the Bus Station (line 4C). There is a taxi stop in front of the station.

== History ==
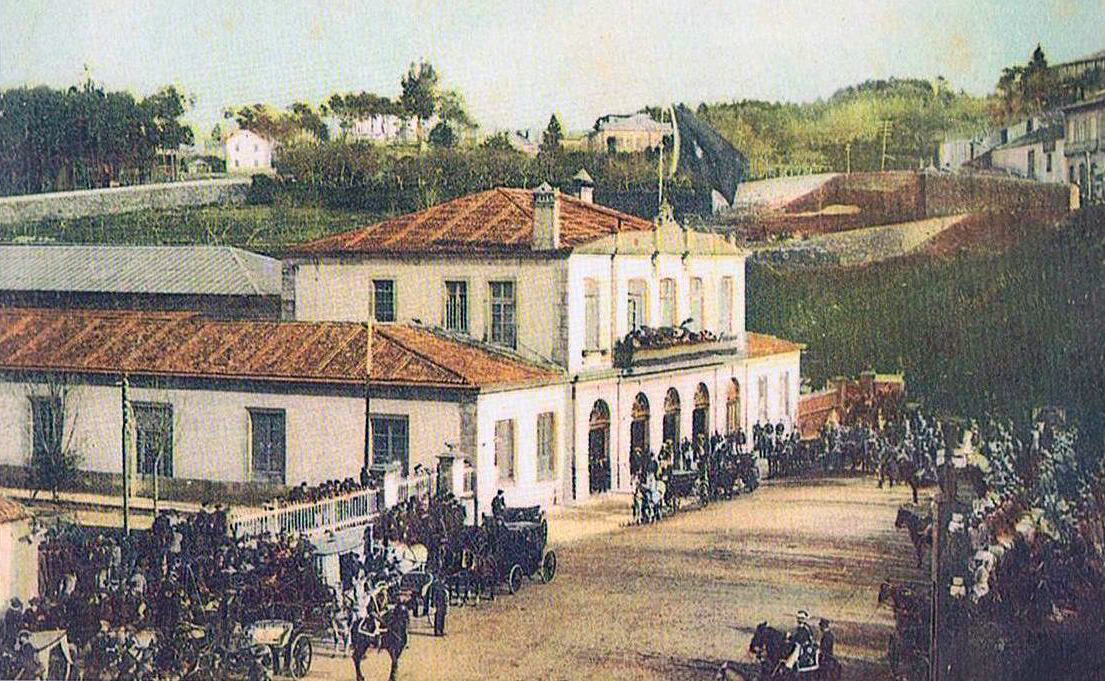
Facade of the first station, in the 1870s

The station is located on the grounds of the original Vigo-Urzáiz station built in 1878, from which the first train left on 18 June 1881 for Ourense, thus inaugurating the railway service in the city of Vigo.

On 27 August 2011 the old Vigo-Urzáiz station ceased to provide rail service, moving all services to the Vigo-Guixar station and proceeding to the demolition of all the facilities including the maintenance warehouses to proceed with the construction of the current underground station 15 metres below the original level.

Work then began on the new station, which was to be completed in March 2015. Initially, a Vialia shopping centre was to be built on top of the railway caisson, but the lack of interest from private developers led to its construction being postponed, with the structures ready for future construction, which began in November 2018 and is expected to last 20 months. As a result, it has been necessary to construct a temporary building outside the station site in order to provide railway services while work is being carried out on the future shopping centre.

On March 6, 2015, the first train to the new station, a Renfe 121 series train, went into service.

On 30 March 2015 the station was visited by the Minister of Public Works at the time, Ana Pastor, who arrived on a test train.

On 18 April 2015 the station was opened to commercial traffic with the entry into service of the new services, with high-speed services being operated from the new station and conventional services and the international link to Portugal being maintained from Vigo-Guixar station. The maintenance workshops were permanently moved to Redondela station in July 2012.

Since November 2018, work has been underway on the definitive station, designed by American architect Thom Mayne, with a Vialia shopping centre by Adif and operated by Ceetrus España.

=== Vialia Vigo shopping centre ===
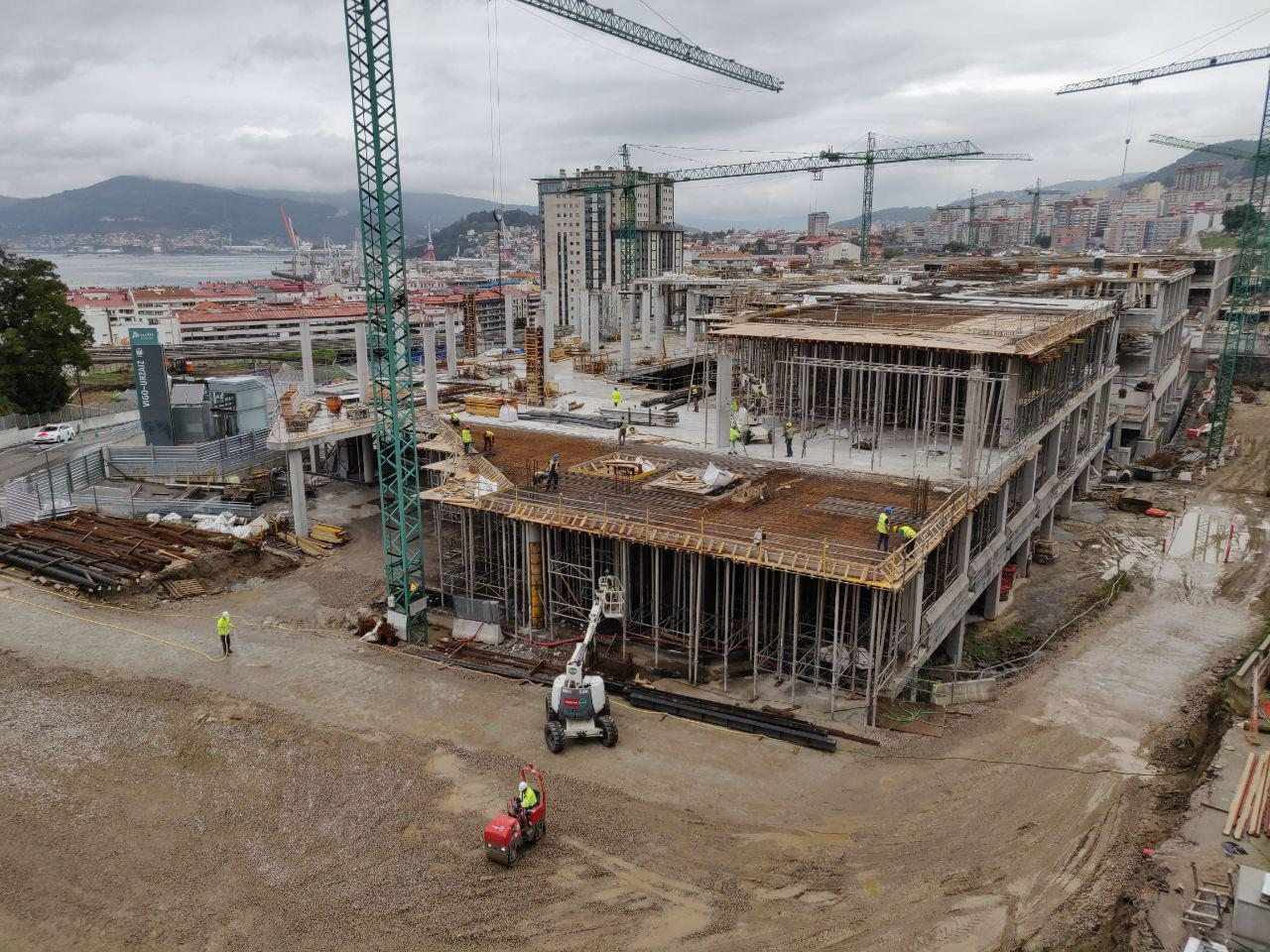
Vialia Vigo under construction in 2021.

In addition to its railway functions, the Vigo-Urzáiz station is part of the Adif Vialia network, which implies that an important part of the enclosure is used for commercial purposes, housing a shopping center in the upper part of the drawer railway. It's scheduled to go into service in September 2021.

== Gallery ==
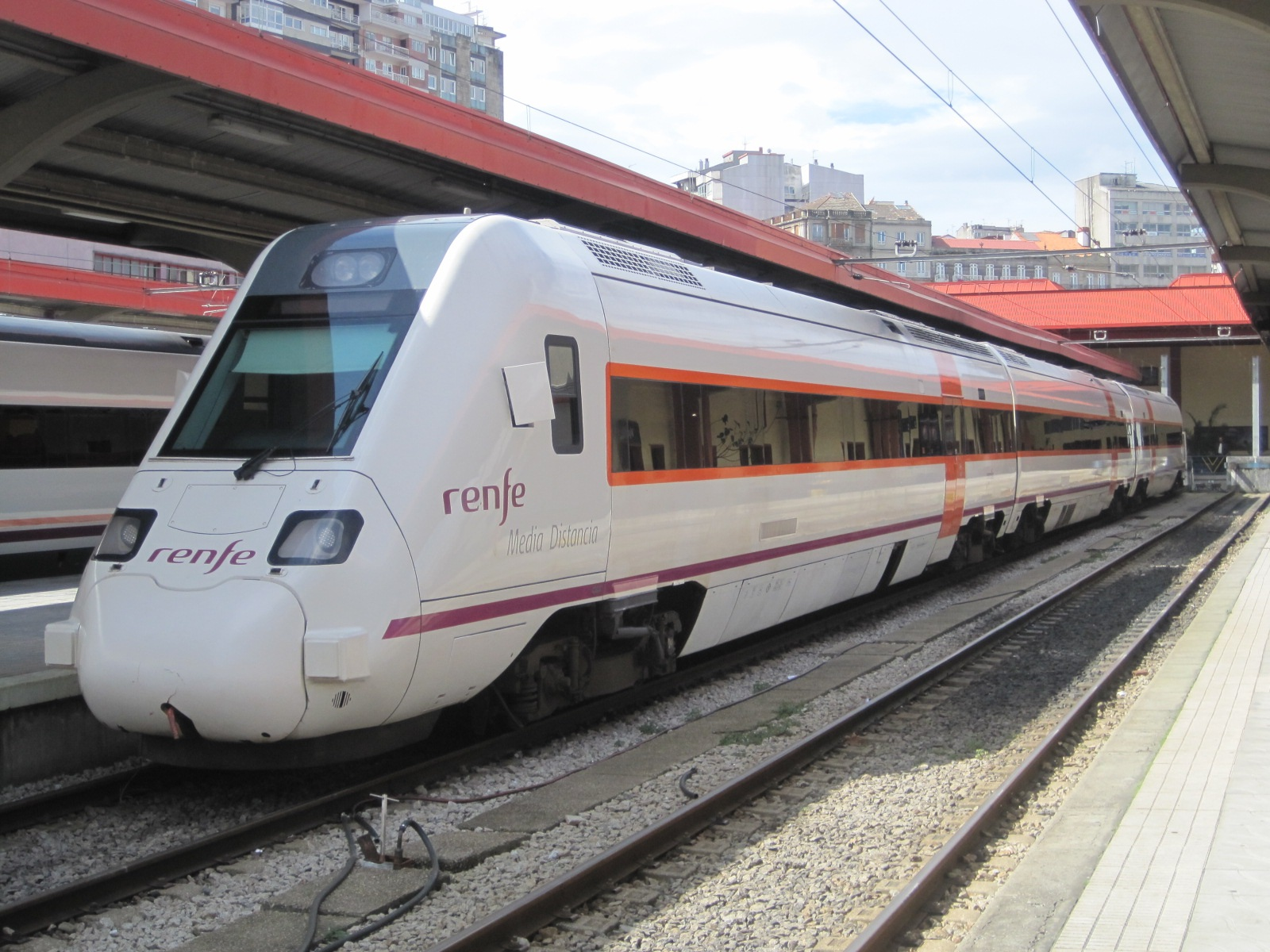
Renfe class 598 at Vigo railway station.

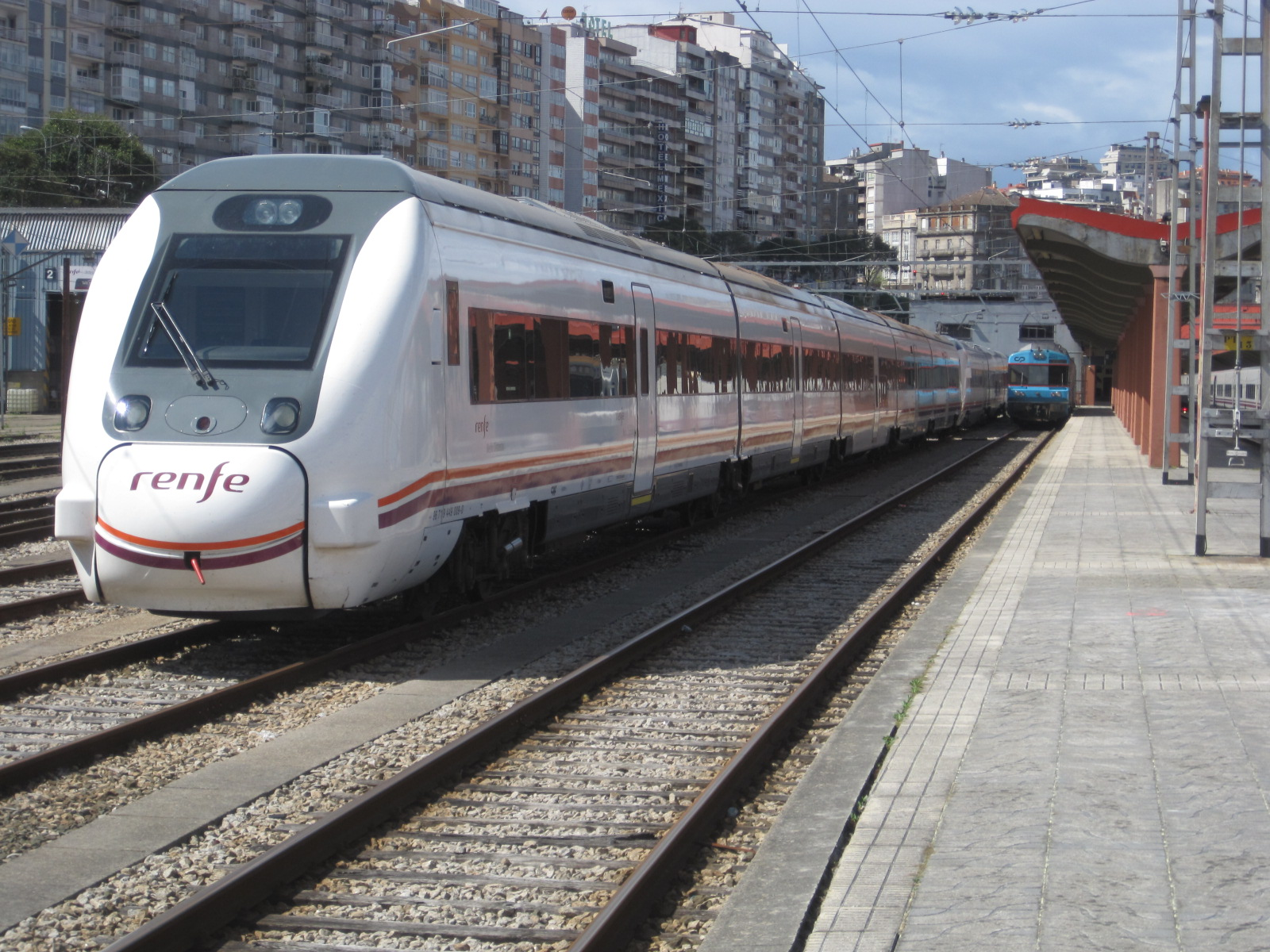
Renfe class 449 at Vigo railway station.

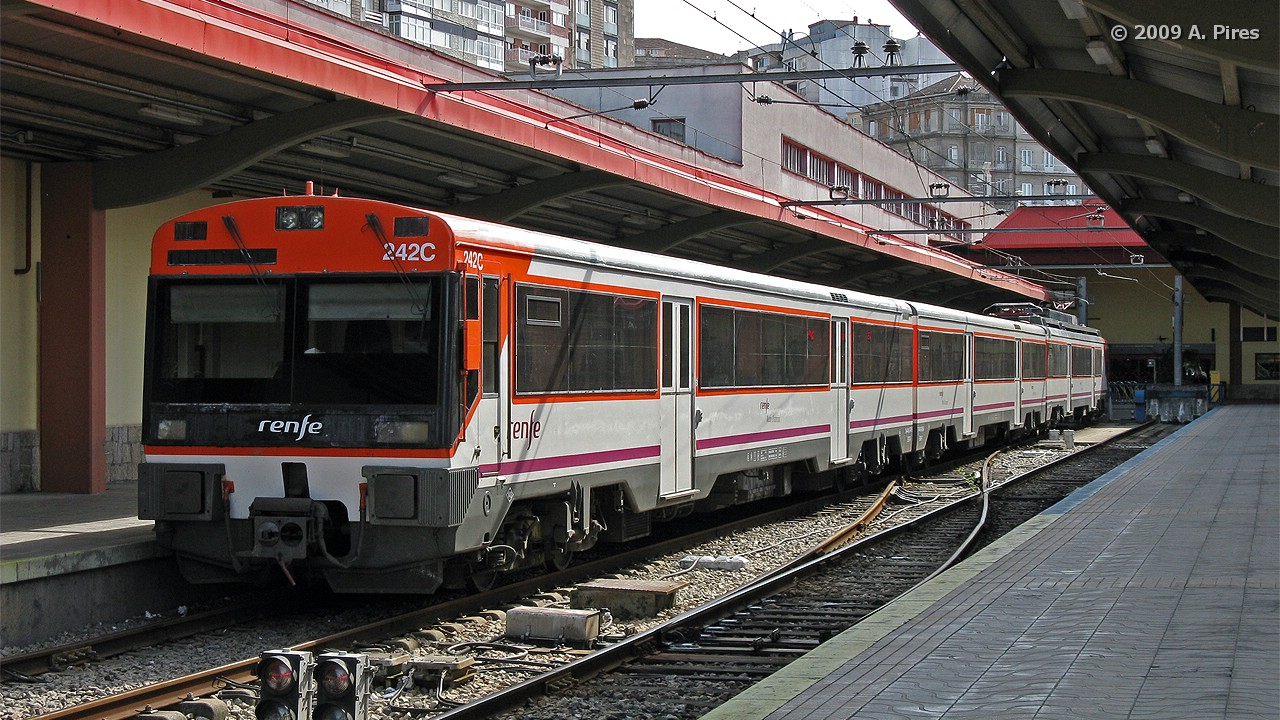
Renfe class 470 at Vigo railway station.

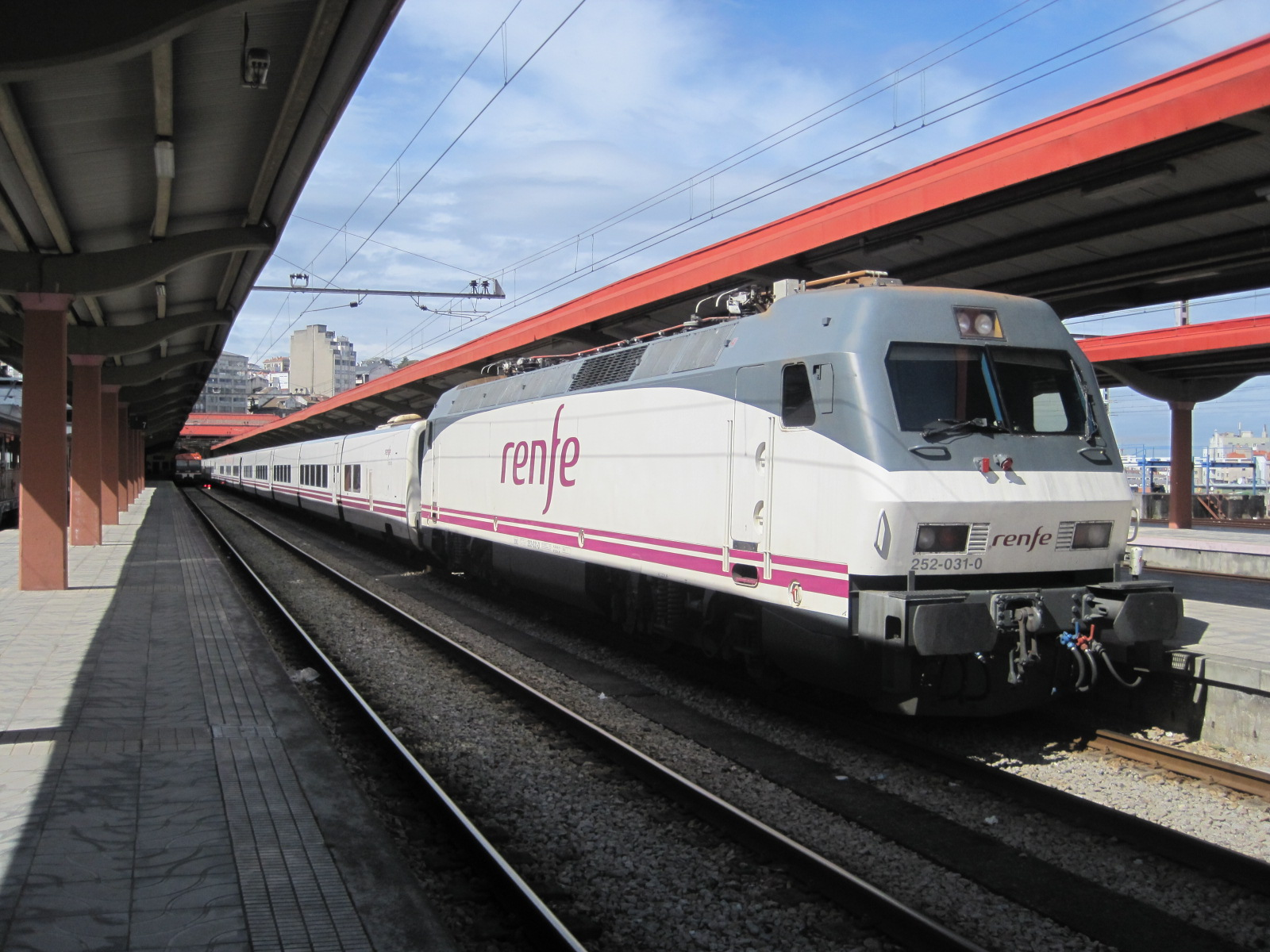
RENFE Class 252 locomotive and Trenhotel at Vigo railway station.

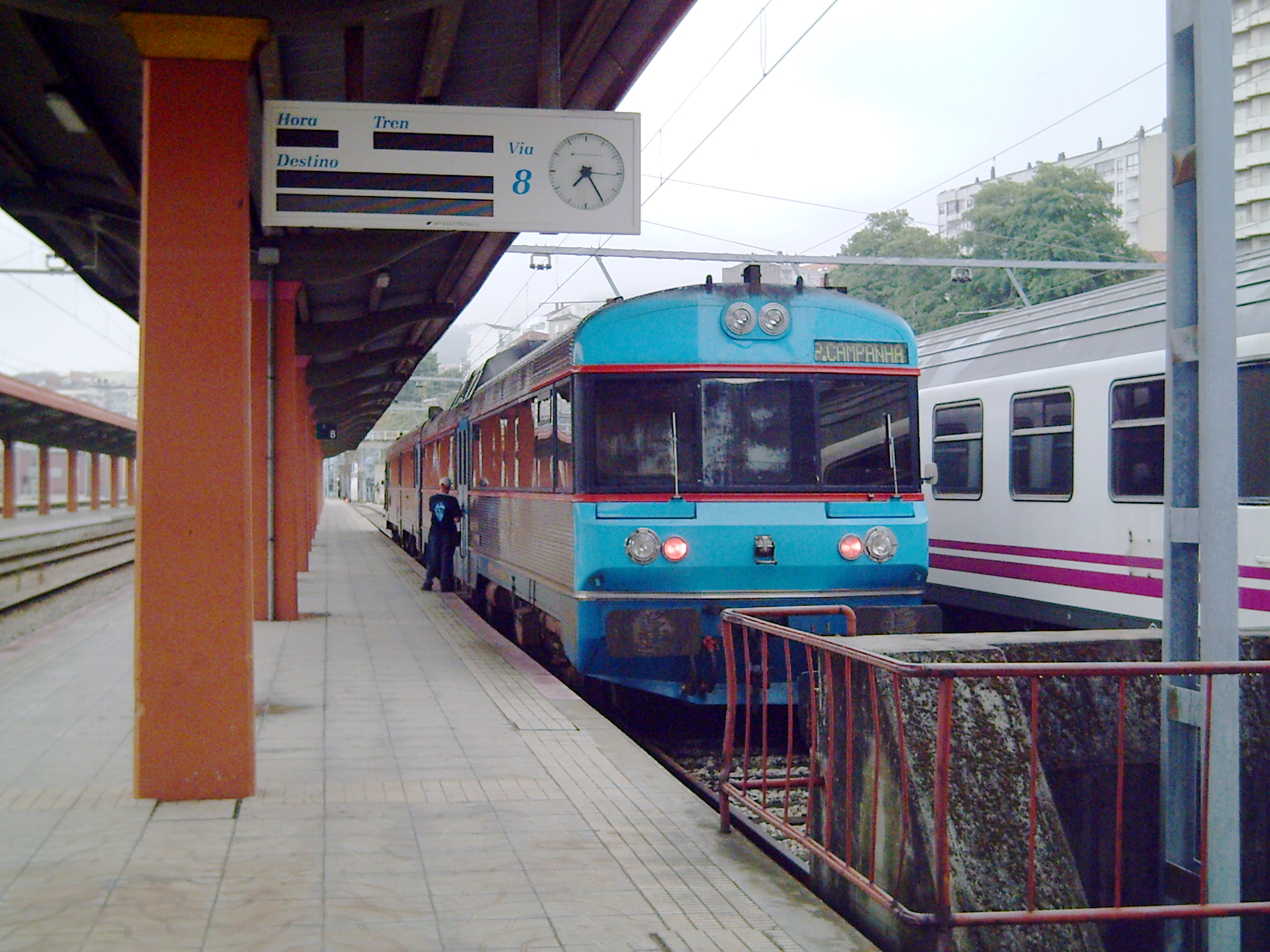
A CP class 0450 train at Vigo railway station, on an international working from Porto

== See also ==
- Vigo-Guixar railway station

Preceding station	Renfe Operadora	Following station
Pontevedra towards Madrid Chamartín	Alvia	Terminus
Redondela AV towards A Coruña	Avant	Terminus
