= Vigo-Guixar railway station =

Railway station in Spain

Vigo-Guixar
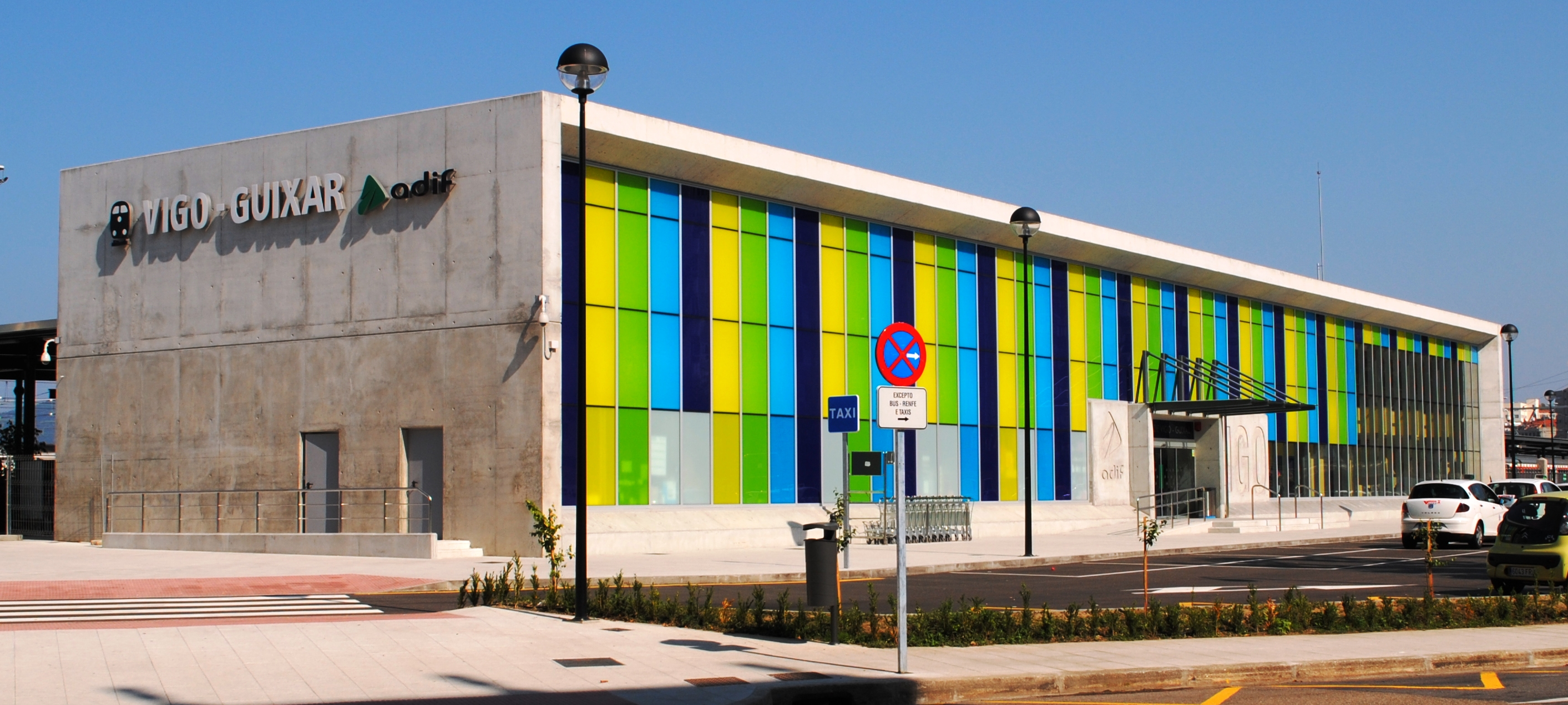

General information
- Location: c/ Areal, s/n Vigo; 36201- Pontevedra
- Coordinates: 42.239321°N 8.715398°W
- Owner: adif
- Line: Monforte de Lemos-Vigo
- Platforms: 3
- Tracks: 5 + 2 service tracks
- Connections: Vitrasa bus service: C2, C3, C5B, L10, L17

Construction
- Structure type: At-grade
- Parking: 175 parking spaces
- Accessible: yes

Other information
- Station code: 22308

History
- Opened: 27 August 2011

Passengers
- 2018: 523,645

Services
| Preceding station | Renfe Operadora | Following station |
|---|---|---|
| Redondela towards Barcelona Sants | Alvia | Terminus |
| Redondela towards Bilbao-Abando | Intercity | Terminus |
| Redondela towards Madrid Chamartín | Intercity | Terminus |
| Redondela towards A Coruña | Media Distancia 1 | Terminus |
| Redondela towards Valença | Media Distancia 3 | Terminus |
| Redondela towards León | Media Distancia 6 | Terminus |
| Preceding station | Comboios de Portugal | Following station |
| Valença towards Porto-Campanhã | Celta International Service | Terminus |
Location

Vigo-Guixar railway station is a railway station in Vigo (province of Pontevedra), Spain. Originally the site of a freight depot for the port of Vigo, on the wharf of the same name, it serves as the temporary terminal for all trains into Vigo during the construction of the new Vialia Vigo station - replacing Vigo-Urzaiz.

The terminal serves passengers travelling on Renfe's middle-distance service (Media Distancia) running across the autonomous community of Galicia.

== History ==
=== Construction ===
The contract for the construction of the station was awarded by the Ministry of Public Works to the Galician construction company Copasa with an estimated budget of 10.6 million euros - this would eventually rise to 17.5 million.

The station was inaugurated on 27 August 2011 by José Blanco, the Minister of Public Works, and Abel Caballero, the mayor of Vigo
