= Trenhotel =

Overnight train service in Spain

Renfe Trenhotel

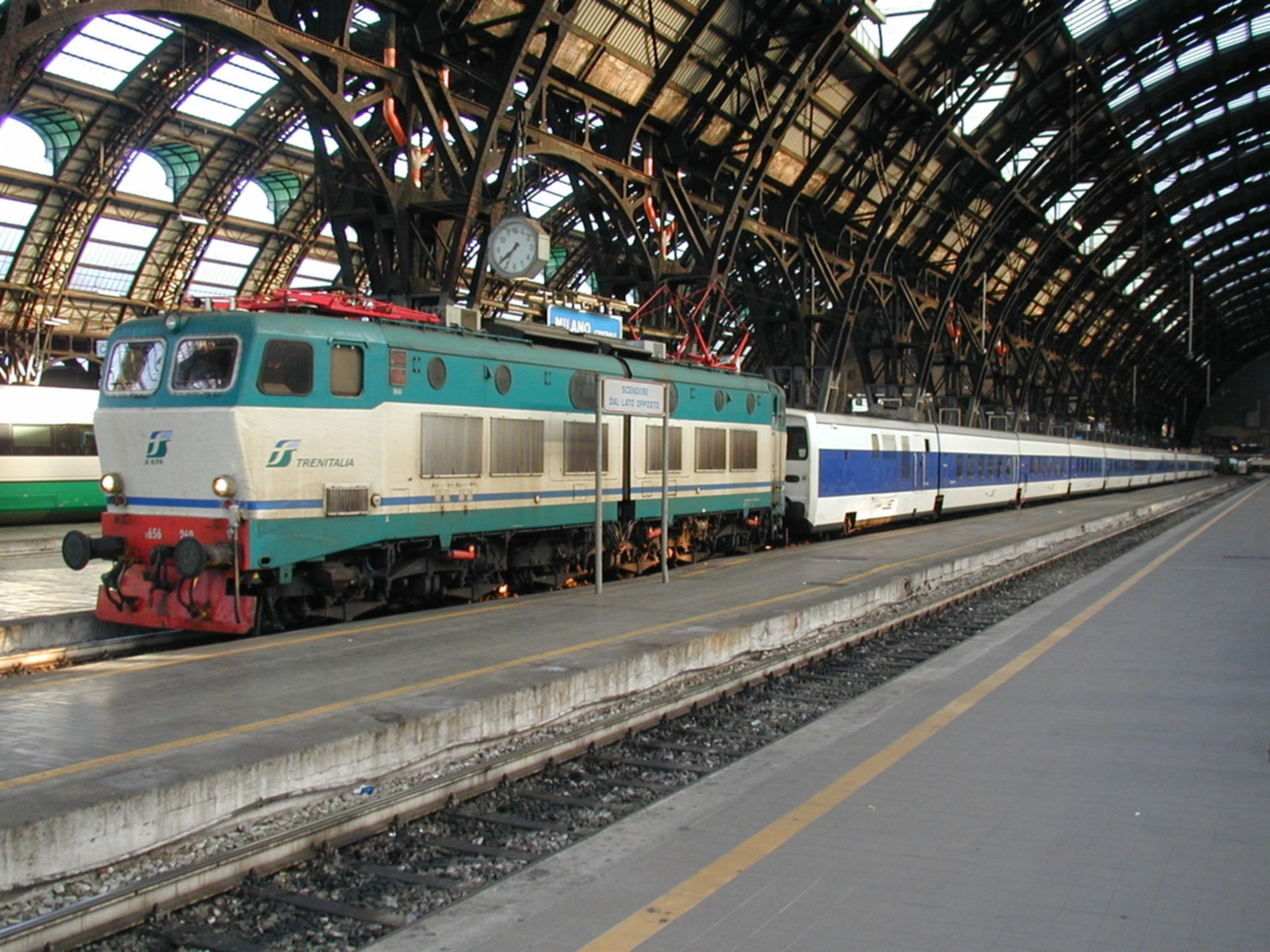
- Trenhotel Salvador Dalí at Milano Centrale railway station

Overview
- Service type: Inter-city rail
- Locale: Spain
- Current operator: Renfe Operadora Comboios de Portugal

On-board services
- Classes: Sleeper Service (Turista, Preferente, Gran Clase) and Seats (Turista, Preferente)
- Catering facilities: Dining car and café

Technical
- Rolling stock: Talgo
- Operating speed: 220 km/h (137 mph) (top)

Trenhotel was a long distance, overnight train service which used Talgo tilting trains and sleeping cars developed by the Spanish rail network operator Renfe. It was operated by Renfe within Spain, and by its subsidiary Elipsos across France, Switzerland and Italy.

The specially developed Talgo carriages were sometimes used by other railway companies, although usually in other livery. Trenhotel also offered special facilities for disabled passengers. A more basic night train service called Tren Estrella previously operated within Spain; this used traditional carriages on conventional Spanish (broad gauge) tracks.

All remaining night train services were effectively terminated in March 2020 during the COVID-19 pandemic and were not replaced. This was due to some routes being covered by daytime high-speed trains, the age of rolling stock and the diminishing popularity of some of the services.

== Composition and services ==
Each Talgo train is composed of several interchangeable carriage types, permitting flexible composition depending on the mission. Tilting train technology is used with the series IV, V, VI and VII carriages.

The series IV do not have gauge change required for cross-border routes and high speed lines, consequently being restricted to operate within the Iberian Peninsula standard network. The series VI are approved for circulation in France, Switzerland, Italy, Germany and Portugal.

A typical Trenhotel composition has:

- Tourist Seats (asientos turistas): similar to the first class (aircraft style) seats on regular trains. On Series VII and international carriages these can be reclined until they are completely horizontal.
- Tourist Cabins: These have washing facilities and four beds which are sold either as a family unit (the cabin is reserved as a whole) or alternatively individual beds may be sold separately so that male and female passengers who may be strangers are not mixed
- Preferred Cabins: Equipped with a sink flush toilet closet, they also have two beds, which are sold as single a unit for one or two occupants.
- High-class cabins: feature a shower, toilet and two beds, which are also sold as single a unit for one or two occupants.
- Cafeteria service units usually with seating and often some limited cabin service.
- Dining car providing full European style meals of different types, depending on the time of the day, and some limited service outside of usual working-hours.

Trenhotel units ordinarily travel at between 180 km/h (110 mph) and 220 km/h (140 mph) with an average speed of around 200 km/h (120 mph).

== Traction ==
Trenhotel units are trailers so all need to incorporate a tractor locomotive. Within Spain, Trenhotel usually uses a Renfe series 252 in electrified areas and Renfe series 334 diesel locomotive in non-electrified areas, while in Portugal it uses CP Series 5600 electric locomotive in electrified areas and CP Series 1400 diesel locomotive in non-electrified areas (only needed if the train is diverted via Badajoz). On international routes the locomotive unit is changed at the border (Vilar Formoso).

== Routes ==
Trenhotel routes were named after famous Spanish places or people.

Domestic routes
Service Name	Spanish rail stations visited
Galicia ruta La Coruña; Barcelona-Sants to A Coruña via Zaragoza & Leon	Barcelona-Sants · Campo de Tarragona · Lérida-Pirineos · Zaragoza-Delicias · Tudela de Navarra · Castejón de Ebro · Logroño · Burgos-Rosa de Lima · Palencia · León · Astorga · Ponferrada · O Barco de Valdeorras · A Rúa-Petín · San Clodio-Quiroga · Monforte de Lemos · Sarria · Lugo · Curtis · Betanzos-Infesta · A Coruña
Galicia ruta Vigo; Barcelona-Sants to Vigo via Zaragoza & Leon	Barcelona-Sants · Campo de Tarragona · Lérida-Pirineos · Zaragoza-Delicias · Tudela de Navarra · Castejón de Ebro · Logroño · Burgos-Rosa de Lima · Palencia · León · Astorga · Ponferrada · O Barco de Valdeorras · A Rúa-Petín · San Clodio-Quiroga · Monforte de Lemos · Ourense-Empalme · Guillarrei · O Porriño · Redondela de Galicia · Vigo
Rías Gallegas/Rías Baixas; Madrid - Chamartín to Vigo via Leon & Ourense	Madrid-Chamartín · Ávila· Medina del Campo · Valladolid-Campo Grande · León · Veguellina · Astorga · Bembibre · Ponferrada · O Barco de Valdeorras · A Rúa-Petín · San Clodio-Quiroga · Monforte de Lemos · Ourense-Empalme · Ribadabia · Guillarrei · O Porriño · Redondela· Vigo · Pontevedra
Atlántico; Madrid-Chamartín to A Coruña and Ferrol via Leon & Lugo	Madrid-Chamartín · Ávila · Medina del Campo · Valladolid-Campo Grande · León · Veguellina · Astorga · Bembibre · Ponferrada · O Barco de Valdeorras · A Rúa-Petín · San Clodio-Quiroga · Monforte de Lemos · Sarria · Lugo · Gutiriz · Curtis · Betanzos-Infesta · A Coruña · Betanzos-Cidade · Pontedeume · Ferrol
International routes
Service Name	European stations visited
Sud-Expresso; Hendaye to Lisboa Santa Apolónia via Coimbra-B	Hendaye (France) · Irún (Spain) · San Sebastián · Vitoria · Miranda de Ebro · Burgos-Rosa de Lima · Valladolid-Campo Grande · Medina del Campo · Salamanca · Ciudad Rodrigo · Fuentes de Oñoro (Spain) · Villar Formoso (Portugal)· Guarda · Celorico da Beira · Mangualde · Santa Comba Dão · Coimbra-B · Pombal · Caxarias· Entroncamento · Lisboa Oriente · Lisboa Santa Apolónia
Lusitânia Madrid-Chamartín to Lisboa Santa Apolónia via Salamanca	Madrid-Chamartín · Ávila · Medina del Campo · Salamanca · Ciudad Rodrigo · Fuentes de Oñoro (Spain) · Villar Formoso (Portugal)· Guarda · Celorico da Beira · Mangualde · Santa Comba Dão · Coimbra-B · Pombal · Caxarias· Entroncamento · Lisboa Oriente · Lisboa Santa Apolónia

== Suspension of service during the Covid-19 pandemic ==
As a result of the COVID-19 pandemic, Trenhotel connections were discontinued beginning March 17, 2020. At the end of April 2020, Renfe announced the suspension of all night Trenhotel services due to lack of profitability. As a result, Lisbon loses its only international train connection to the rest of Europe. After talks with regional governments, Renfe announced on May 2, 2020 that Trenhotel services to the Spanish region of Galicia would not be discontinued. However by the end of April 2021, none of the suspended services had been reintroduced.
