= Biarritz station =

Railway station in Biarritz, France

Biarritz
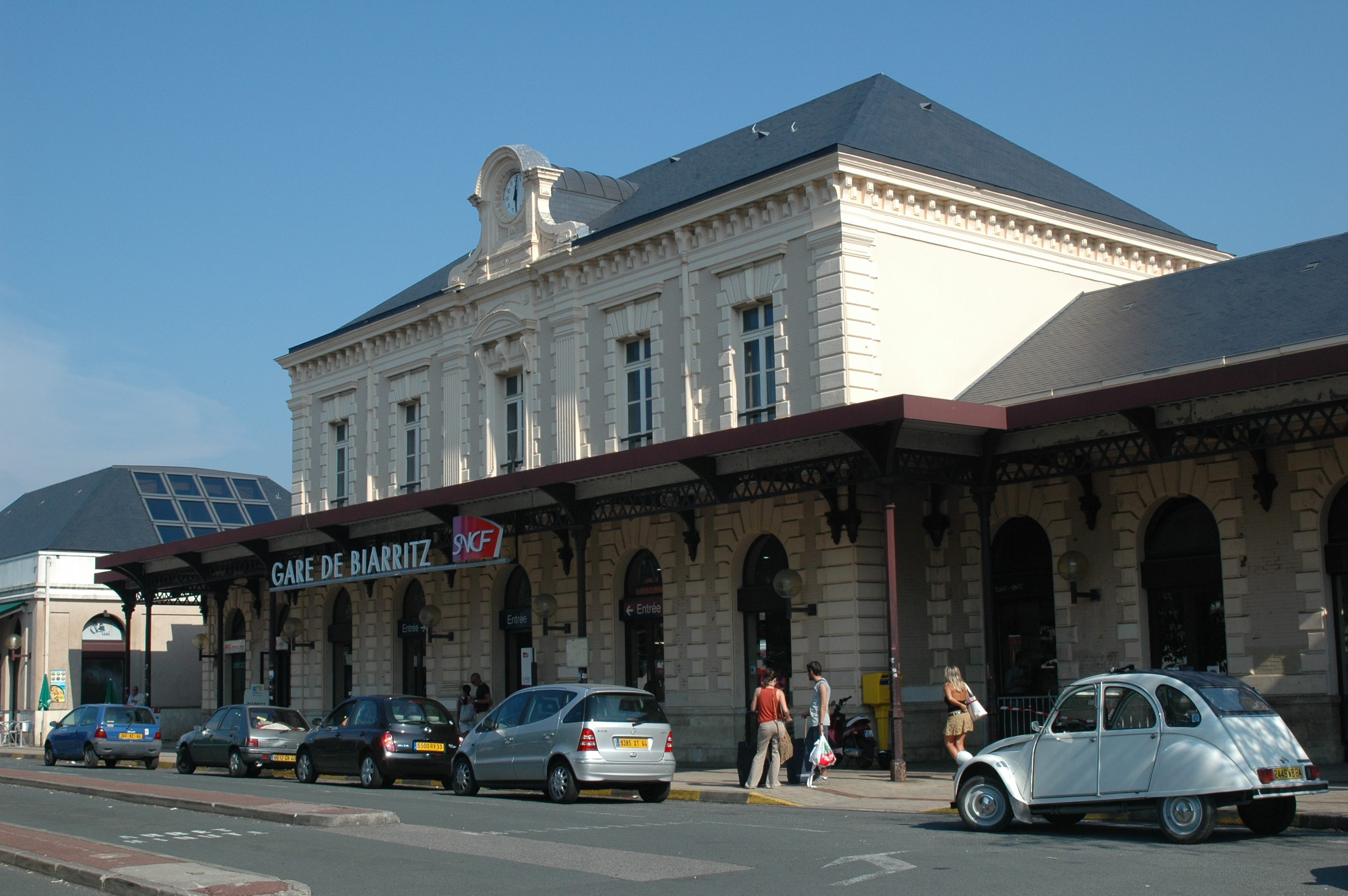
- Biarritz station in 2006

General information
- Location: allée du Mourra, 64200; Biarritz; France
- Coordinates: 43.4592°N 1.5458°W
- Elevation: 43 m (141 ft)
- Owner: SNCF
- Operator: SNCF
- Lines: Bordeaux–Irun; Biarritz-la-Négresse–Biarritz-Ville

Other information
- Station code: 87673400
Services
Preceding station	SNCF	Following station
Saint-Jean-de-Luz-Ciboure towards Hendaye	TGV inOui	Bayonne towards Montparnasse
Saint-Jean-de-Luz-Ciboure towards Hendaye	Intercités	Bayonne towards Toulouse
Bayonne towards Paris-Austerlitz	Intercités (night)	Saint-Jean-de-Luz-Ciboure towards Hendaye
Preceding station	TER Nouvelle-Aquitaine	Following station
Bayonne towards Bordeaux	51	Guéthary towards Hendaye
Location

Biarritz station (French: Gare de Biarritz; Occitan: Estacion de Biarritz; Basque: Biarritz geltokia) is a railway station in Biarritz, Nouvelle-Aquitaine, France. The station is located on the Bordeaux–Irun railway line. The station is served by TGV (high speed trains), Intercités de Nuit (night trains), Intercités (long distance), and TER (local) services operated by the SNCF.

== Train services ==
The following services currently call at Biarritz:

- high speed services (TGV) Paris - Bordeaux - Hendaye
- intercity services (Intercités) Hendaye - Bayonne - Pau - Tarbes - Toulouse
- local service (TER Nouvelle-Aquitaine) Bordeaux - Dax - Bayonne - Hendaye

== Gallery ==
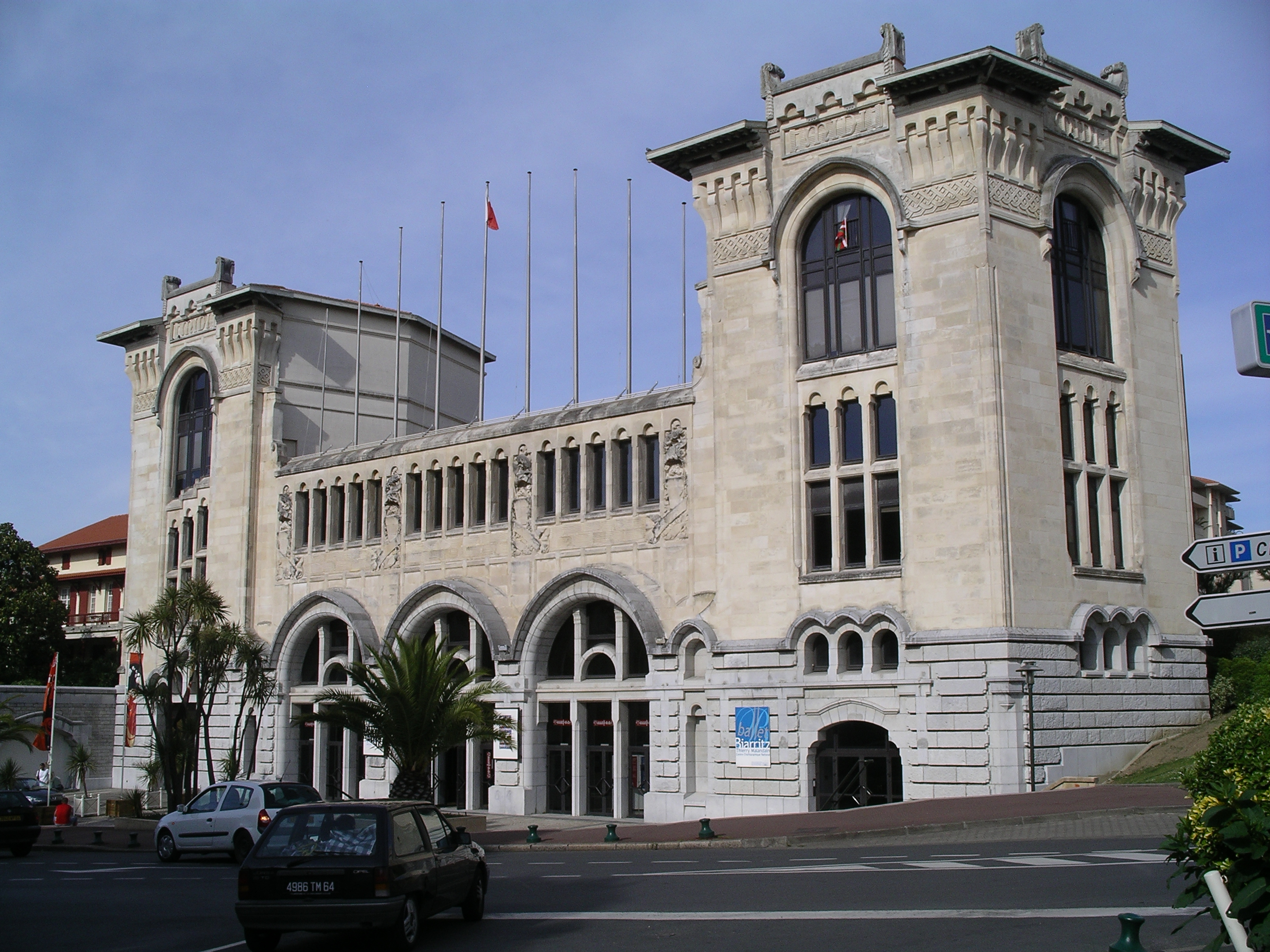
The former station of Biarritz-Ville (1911–1980)

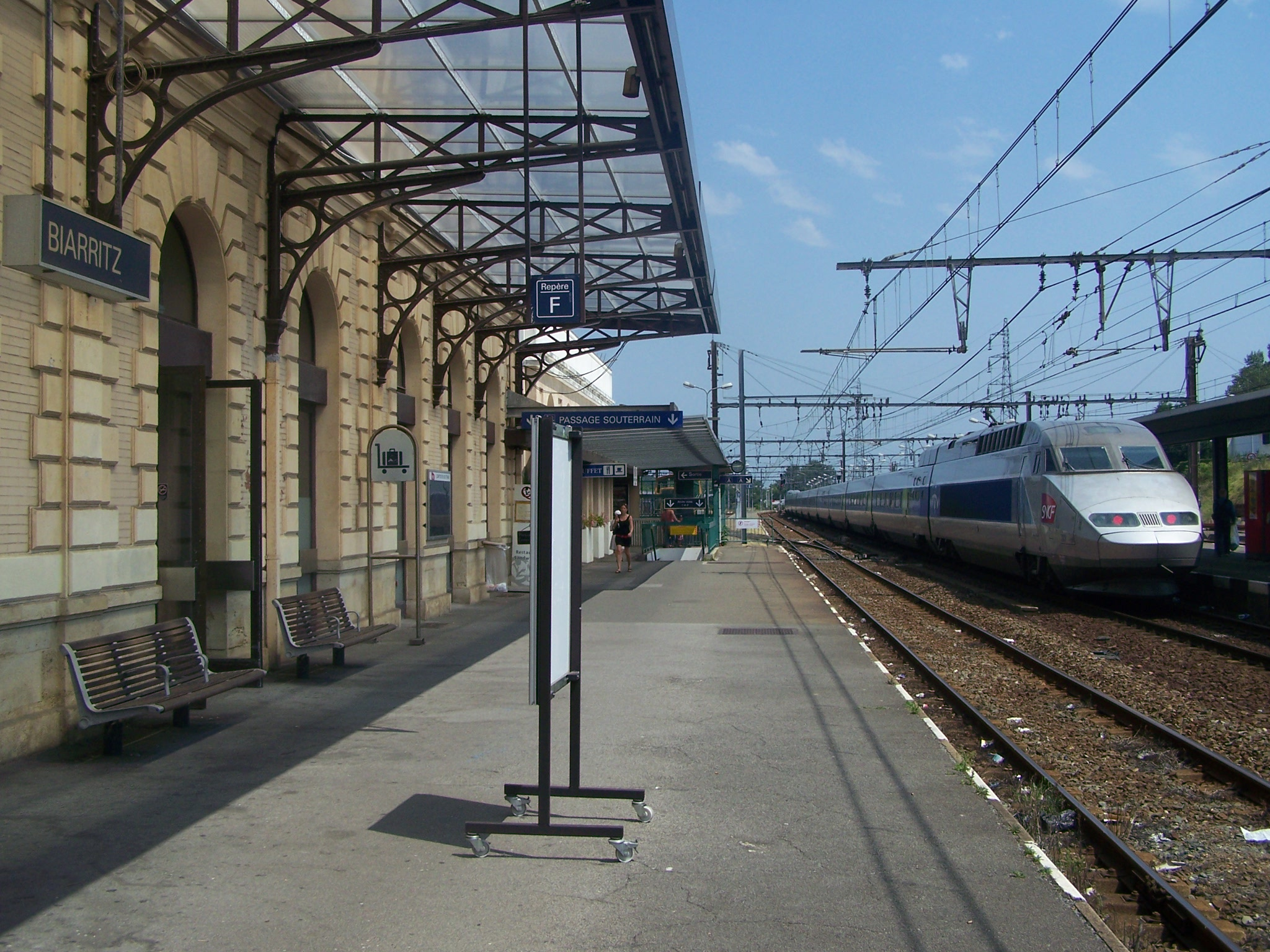
A TGV at Biarritz

== See also ==
- List of SNCF stations in Nouvelle-Aquitaine
