= Boucau station =

Railway station in Boucau, France

Coordinates: 43°31′25″N 1°29′25″W

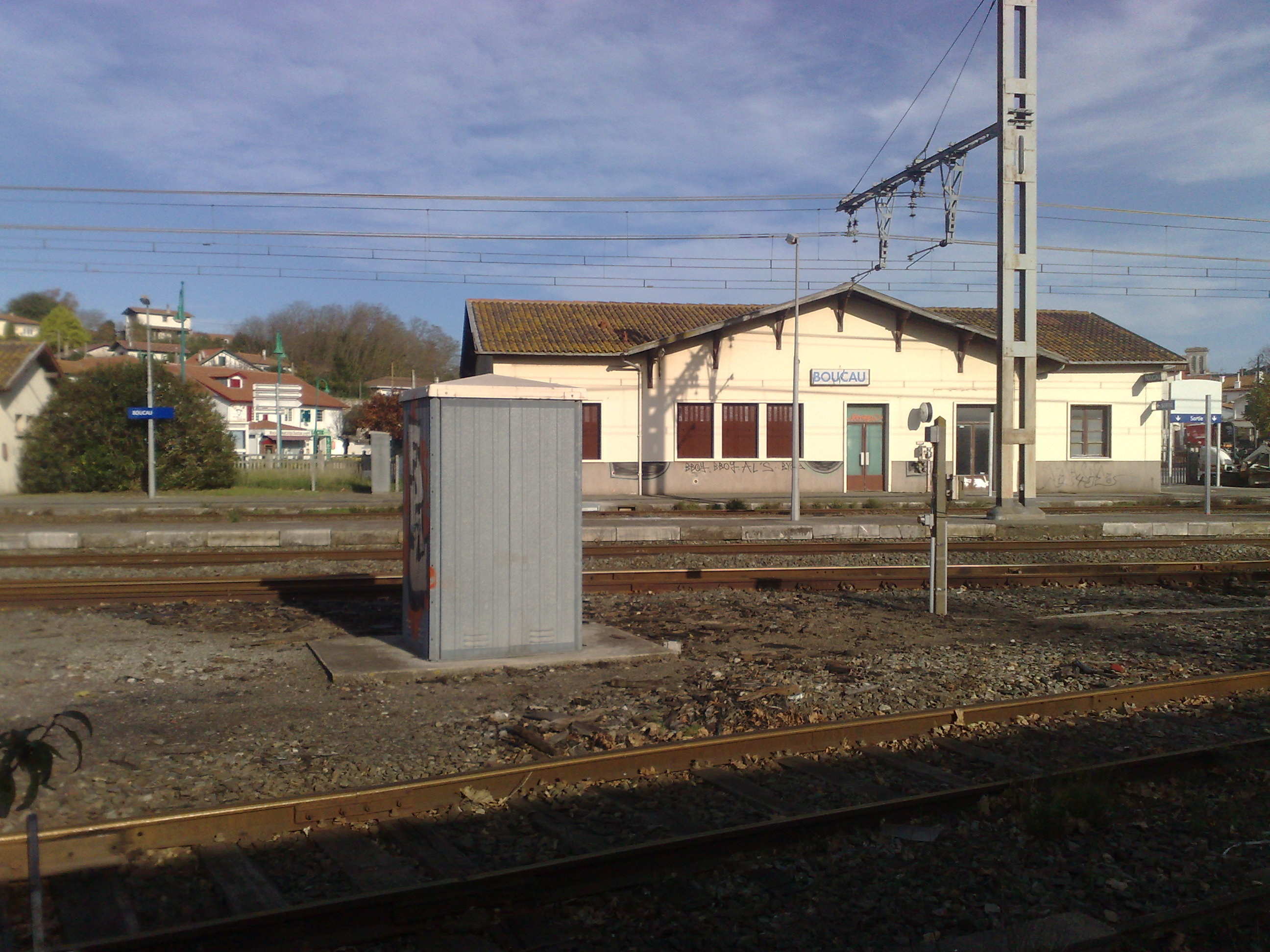
Gare de Boucau

Boucau is a railway station in Boucau, Nouvelle-Aquitaine, France. The station is located on the Bordeaux–Irun railway line. The station is served by TER (local) services operated by the SNCF.

== Train services ==
The following services currently call at Boucau:

- local service (TER Nouvelle-Aquitaine) Bordeaux - Dax - Bayonne - Hendaye

Preceding station	TER Nouvelle-Aquitaine	Following station
Ondres towards Bordeaux	51	Bayonne towards Hendaye
