= Guéthary station =

Railway station in Guéthary, Nouvelle-Aquitaine, France

Coordinates: 43°25′31″N 1°36′34″W

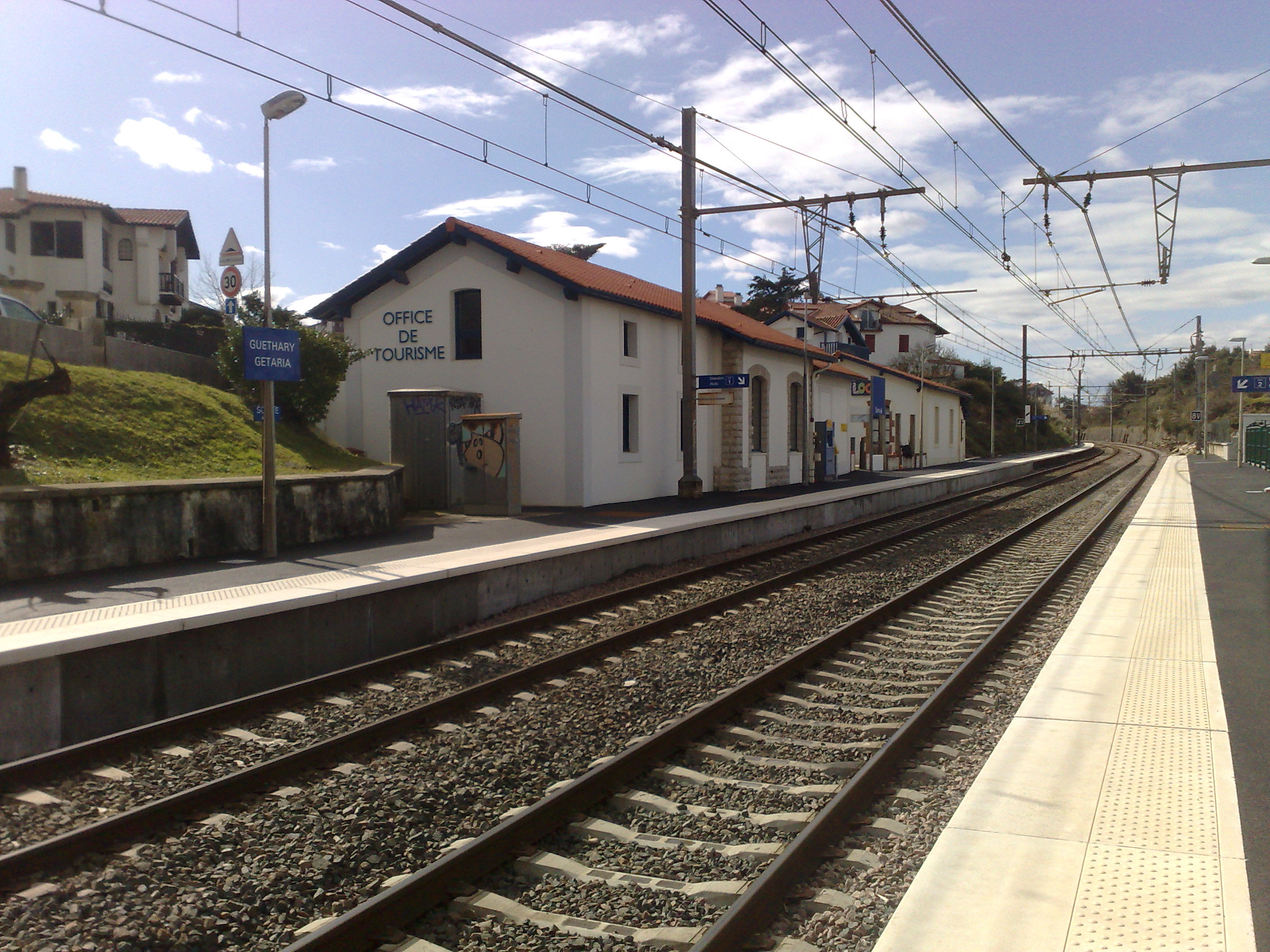
Guéthary station

Guéthary is a railway station in Guéthary, Nouvelle-Aquitaine, France. The station is located on the Bordeaux–Irun railway line. The station is served by TER (local) services operated by the SNCF.

== Train services ==
The following services currently call at Guéthary:

- local service (TER Nouvelle-Aquitaine) Bordeaux - Dax - Bayonne - Hendaye

Preceding station	TER Nouvelle-Aquitaine	Following station
Biarritz towards Bordeaux	51	Saint-Jean-de-Luz-Ciboure towards Hendaye

== Gallery ==
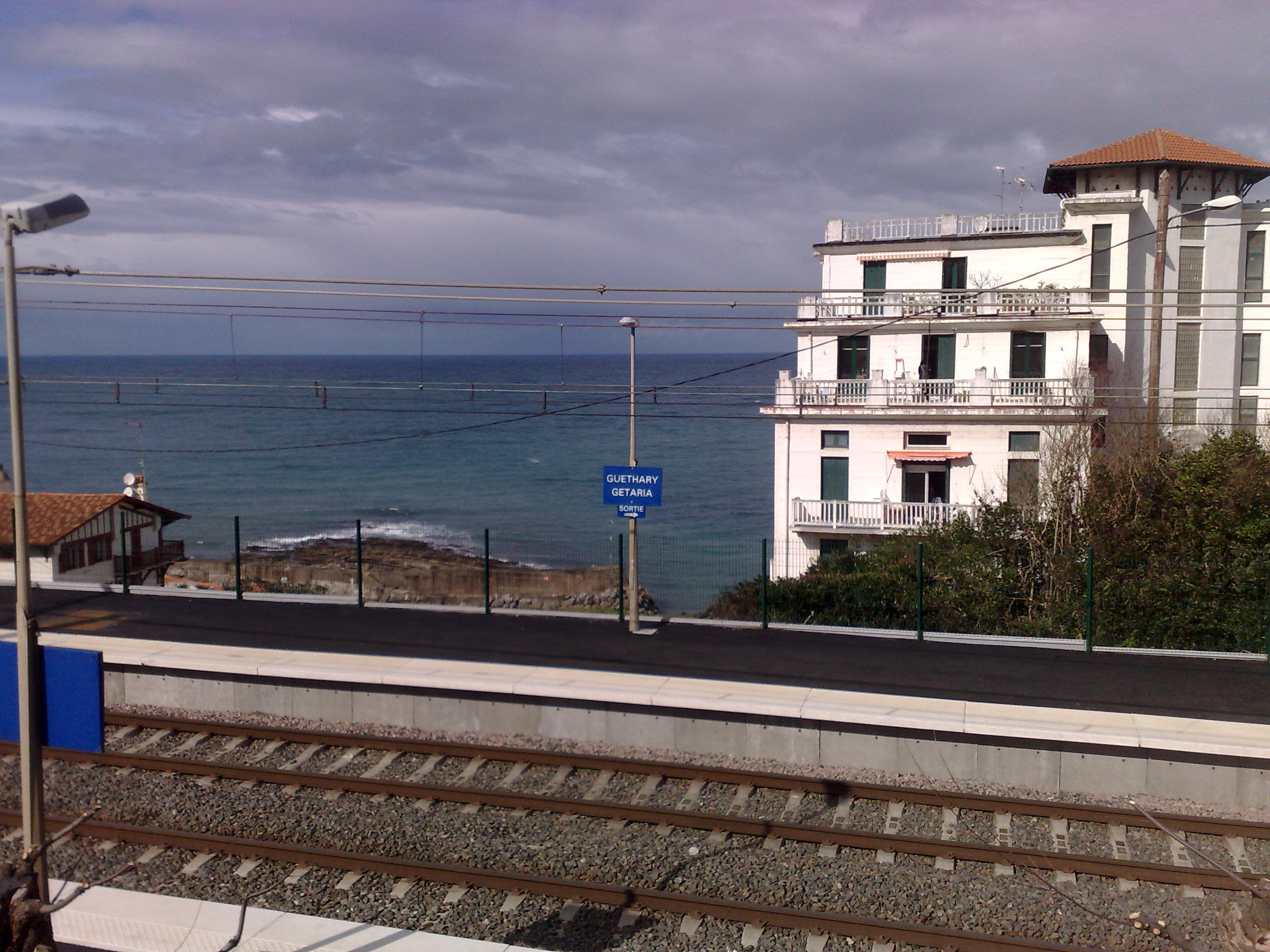
The station, looking out at sea

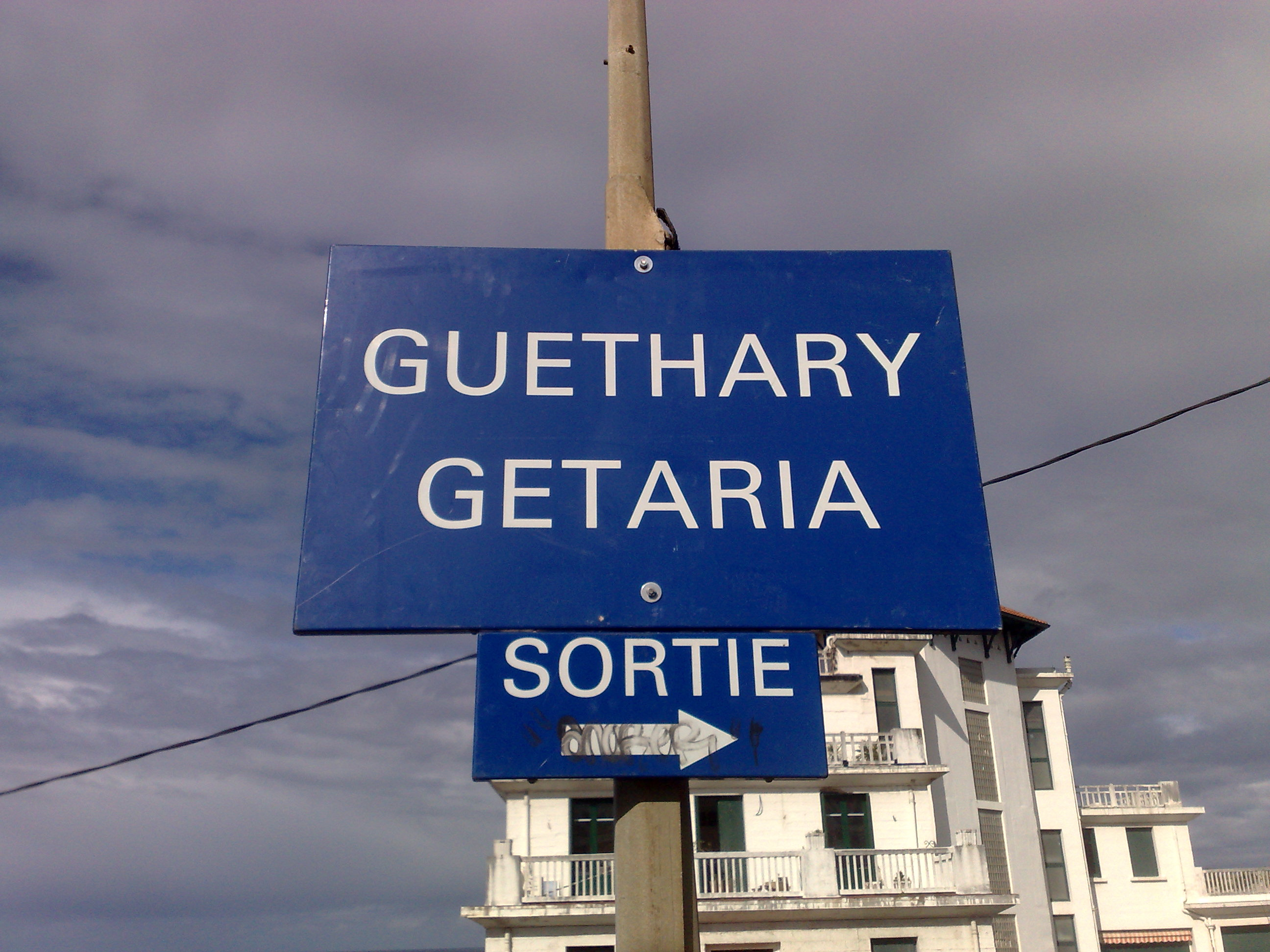
The station sign
