= Castle of Linhares =

Medieval castle in Guarda, Portugal

Coordinates: 40°32′29″N 7°27′40″W

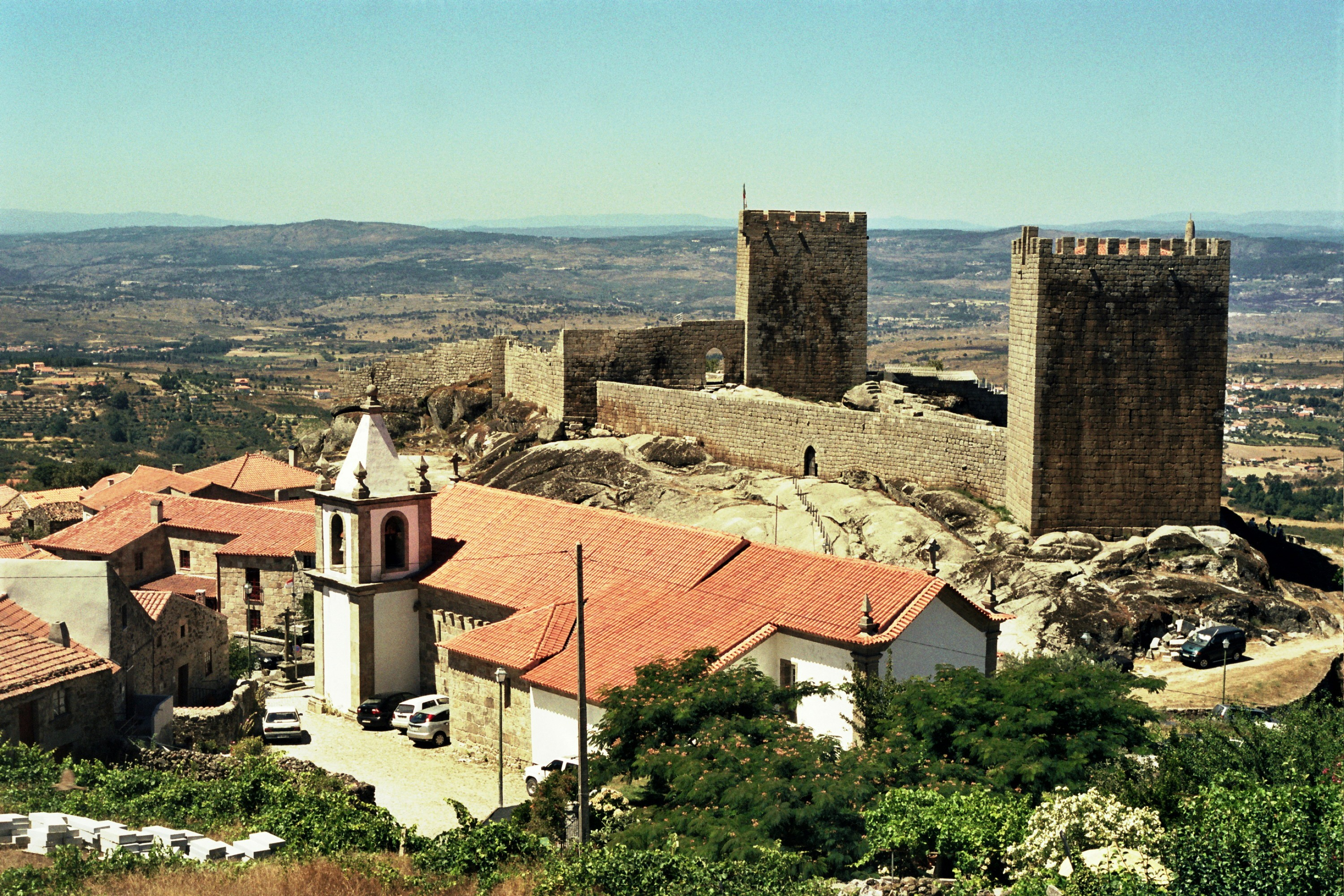
Castle of Linhares

The Castle of Linhares (Portuguese: Castelo de Linhares da Beira) is a medieval castle in the civil parish of Linhares, municipality of Celorico da Beira, in the Portuguese district of Guarda.

It is classified as a National Monument.

The Castelo de Linhares da Beira was built between the end of the 11th century and the early 12th century. It is at an altitude of 820 meters and is Romano Gothic in architectural style. It is contained within two walled stone enclosures. It possesses two towers, the keep and the clock tower, and four gates. The first gate contains a barrel vault; the second a round arch set into the side walls; the third a blunt arch in the wall separating the two enclosures and the fourth gate is known as the Traitors' Gate.

The keep is rectangular in shape and the older of the two towers, built in the 12th century and reportedly by Order of the Knights Templar. It is the highest point built for the purpose of defense. The walls had openings called arrow slits which allowed arrows to be fired at enemies. Its balconies were added during the 14th-century Gothic transformations.

The clock tower was added during the Gothic reforms under Denis of Portugal (13th century) and Ferdinand I of Portugal (14th century). Its crenelations are more numerous and narrower. This was done to provide a more offensive design. It contains the replica of a clock added in the 17th century. It was connected to a bell outside the tower in 1817 and was used to inform the local population of time.
