= Les Deux-Jumeaux station =

Railway station in Hendaye, France

Coordinates: 43°22′11″N 1°45′51″W

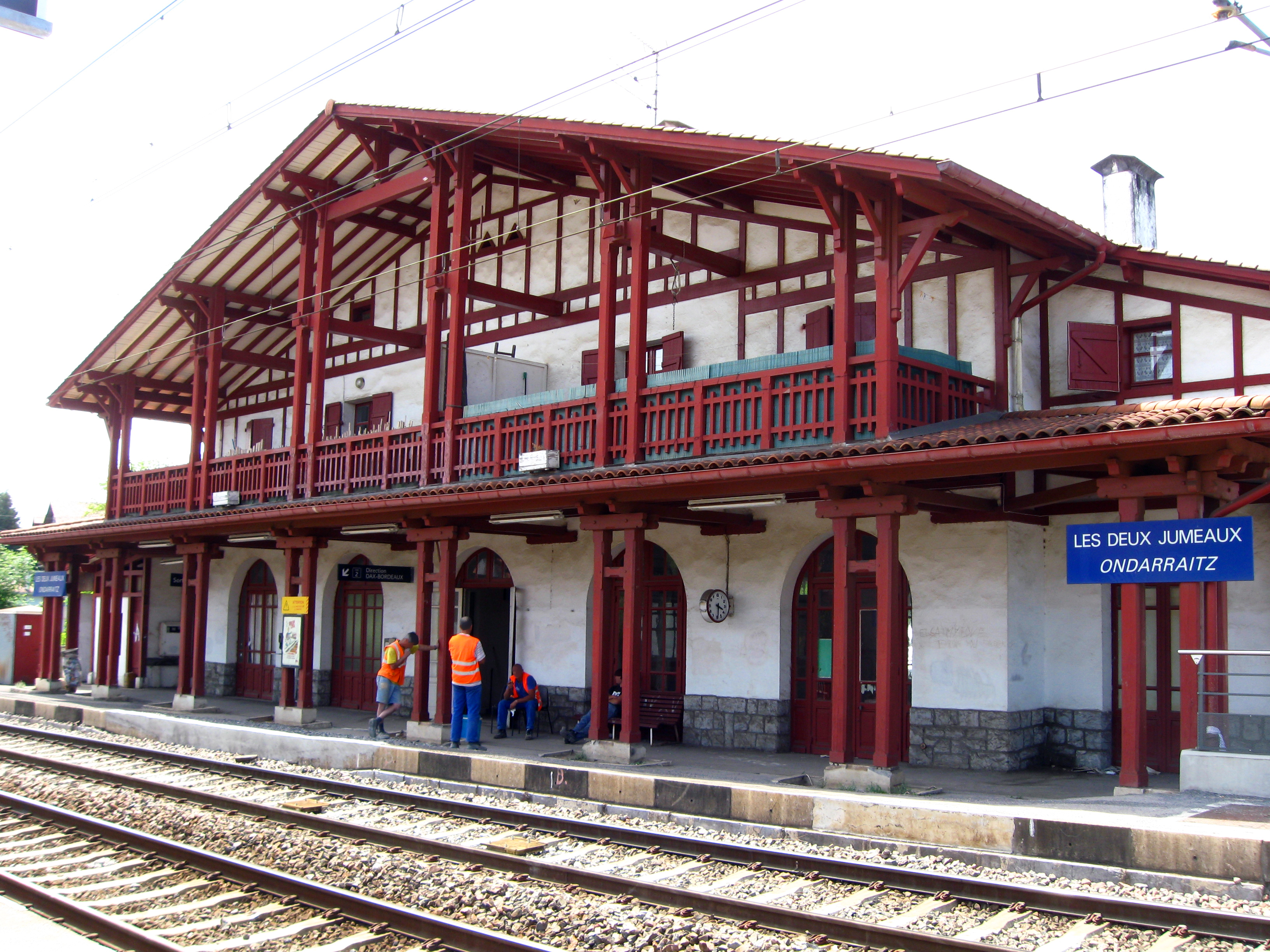
Les Deux-Jumeaux station

Les Deux-Jumeaux (formerly Hendaye-Plage) is a railway station in Hendaye, Nouvelle-Aquitaine, France. The station is located on the Bordeaux–Irun railway line. The station is served by TER (local) services operated by the SNCF.

== Train services ==
The following services currently call at Les Deux-Jumeaux:

- local service (TER Nouvelle-Aquitaine) Bordeaux – Dax – Bayonne – Hendaye

Preceding station	TER Nouvelle-Aquitaine	Following station
Saint-Jean-de-Luz-Ciboure towards Bordeaux	51	Hendaye Terminus
