= Saint-Jean-de-Luz–Ciboure station =

Train station in France

Coordinates: 43°23′09″N 1°39′37″W

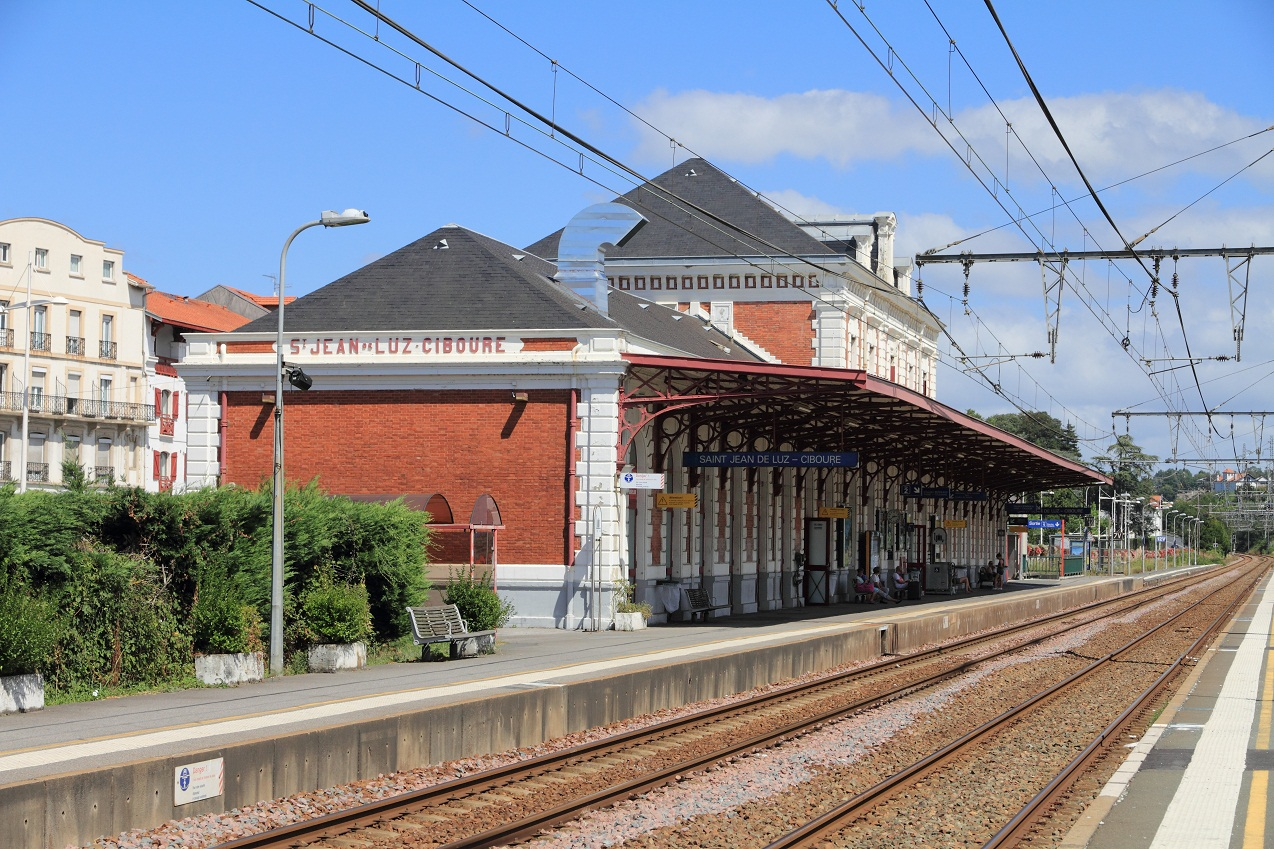
Saint-Jean-de-Luz-Ciboure railway station

Saint-Jean-de-Luz-Ciboure is a railway station in Saint-Jean-de-Luz and across the river from Ciboure, Nouvelle-Aquitaine, France. The station is located on the Bordeaux–Irun railway line. The station is served by TGV (high speed trains), Intercités de Nuit (night trains), Intercités (long distance) and TER (local) services operated by the SNCF.

== Train services ==
The following services currently call at Saint-Jean-de-Luz-Ciboure:

- high speed services (TGV) Paris - Bordeaux - Hendaye
- intercity services (Intercités) Hendaye - Bayonne - Pau - Tarbes - Toulouse
- local service (TER Nouvelle-Aquitaine) Bordeaux - Dax - Bayonne - Hendaye

Preceding station	SNCF	Following station
Hendaye Terminus	TGV inOui	Biarritz towards Montparnasse
Hendaye Terminus	Intercités	Biarritz towards Toulouse
Biarritz towards Paris-Austerlitz	Intercités (night)	Hendaye Terminus
Preceding station	TER Nouvelle-Aquitaine	Following station
Guéthary towards Bordeaux	51	Les Deux-Jumeaux towards Hendaye
