= San Sebastián railway station =

Train station in San Sebastián, Spain

Donostia-San Sebastián
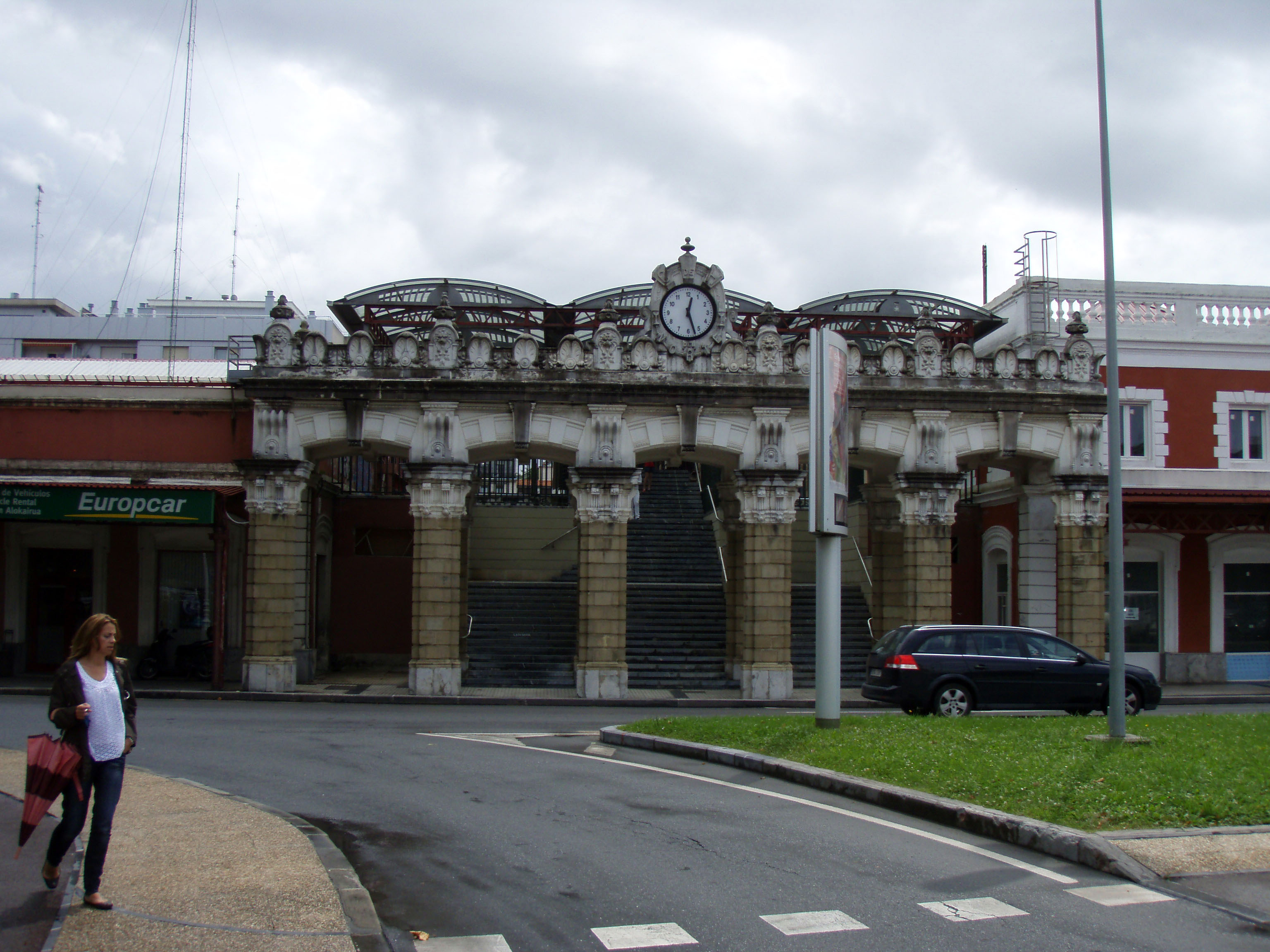
- Front façade

General information
- Location: San Sebastián, Basque Country, Spain
- Coordinates: 43.3177°N 1.9768°W
- Owner: Adif
- Operator: Renfe
- Line: Madrid–Hendaye railway

Passengers
- 2018: 2,146,772
Location

San Sebastián railway station, also known as Donostia-San Sebastián or Estación del Norte, is the main railway station of the Spanish city of San Sebastián, Basque Country. It served over 2 million passengers in 2018.

== Services ==
Alvia services use the Madrid–León high-speed rail line as far as Valladolid-Campo Grande, and switches to the conventional rail network to serve Vitoria-Gasteiz and San Sebastián before reaching Irun. The Barcelona Sants to Irun Alvia service uses the Madrid–Barcelona high-speed rail line to Zaragoza-Delicias before switching to conventional tracks to San Sebastián. The Cercanías San Sebastián commuter rail line also serves the station.

At present, no connection exists to Bilbao by Renfe tracks; however travel between the two cities by the Euskotren Trena metre-gauge network is provided between Matiko station in Bilbao and Donostia-Amara station.

| Preceding station | Renfe Operadora | Following station |
|---|---|---|
| Tolosa towards Madrid Chamartín | Alvia | Irun towards Hendaye |
| Zumárraga towards Barcelona Sants | Alvia | Irun towards Hendaye |
| Zumárraga towards A Coruña | Intercity | Irun towards Hendaye |
| Tolosa towards Madrid Chamartín | Intercity | Alegría de Álava towards Irun |
| Tolosa towards Miranda de Ebro | Media Distancia 25 | Pasajes towards Irun |
| Preceding station | Cercanías San Sebastián | Following station |
| Loiola towards Brinkola | C-1 | Gros towards Irun |

== Future ==
The Basque Y high-speed rail network will connect San Sebastián station to Vitoria-Gasteiz and Bilbao-Abando in 34 and 38 minutes respectively.
