= Boucau =

Boucau Basque: Bokale; Occitan: Bocau
- Commune
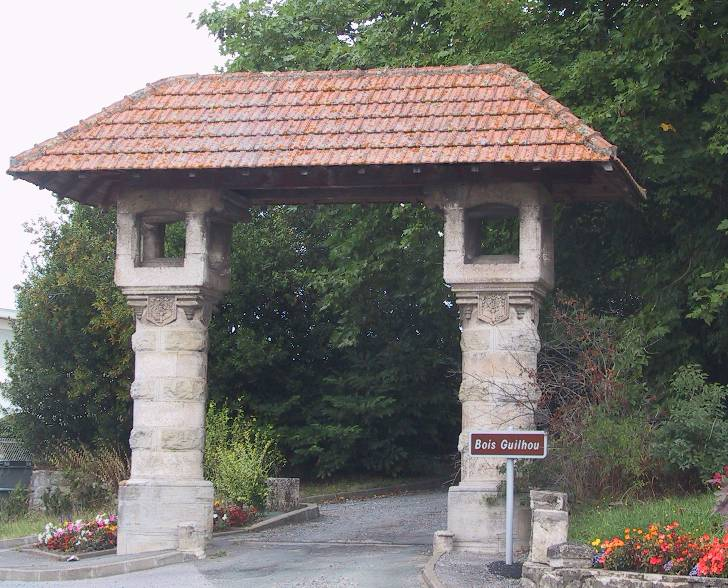
- The west gate of the Guilhou woods
- Location of Boucau
- Location within France Location within Nouvelle-Aquitaine
- Coordinates: 43°31′28″N 1°29′07″W
- Country: France
- Region: Nouvelle-Aquitaine
- Department: Pyrénées-Atlantiques
- Arrondissement: Bayonne
- Canton: Bayonne-2
- Intercommunality: CA Pays Basque

Government
  - Mayor (2021–2026): Francis Gonzalez
- Area^{1}: 5.82 km^{2} (2.25 sq mi)
- Elevation: 20 m (66 ft)
- Highest elevation: 51 m (167 ft)
- Lowest elevation: 0 m (0 ft)
- Population (2023): 8,968
  - Density: 1,540/km^{2} (3,990/sq mi)
- Demonym: Boucalais (French) Bokales (Basque) Bocalés (Gascon)
- Time zone: UTC+01:00 (CET)
  - Summer (DST): UTC+02:00 (CEST)
- INSEE/Postal code: 64140 /64340
- ^{1} French Land Register data, which excludes lakes, ponds, glaciers > 1 km^{2} (0.386 sq mi or 247 acres) and river estuaries.

Boucau (French pronunciation: [buko]; Basque: Bokale; Gascon: Lo Bocau) is a commune in the Pyrénées-Atlantiques department and Nouvelle-Aquitaine region of south-western France. It is located in the former province of Labourd.

== Geography ==
Boucau is a part of Gascony. It borders the Landes department. Boucau is within the Bayonne-Biarritz conurbation, and within the Bayonne urban unit. It covers an area of 5.82 km^{2}. Surrounded by Bayonne, Anglet and Tarnos, Boucau is 4 km north-west of Bayonne, the largest city of the surrounding region. The city sits 11 metres above sea level, and the Adour river runs through the town. Boucau station has rail connections to Hendaye, Bayonne and Bordeaux.

=== Hydrography ===
The Adour flows through Boucau before flowing into the Bay of Biscay with Tarnos (Landes) on the left bank and Anglet (Pyrenées-Atlantique) on the right. One of the rivers that flows into the Adour, the stream of the Esbouc Mill, runs through Boucau.

=== Neighbourhoods ===
Boucau is divided into nine neighbourhoods. These are:

- Montespan in the north
- Matignon in the north
- Beyré in the north
- Barthassot in the north
- Lahillade in the centre
- Romatet in the centre
- Picquessary in the centre
- Loustau in the south
- Saint-Gobain in the south

== Population ==
Historical population
Year	Pop.	±% p.a.
1968	5,831	—
1975	6,091	+0.63%
1982	6,169	+0.18%
1990	6,814	+1.25%
1999	7,007	+0.31%
2007	7,503	+0.86%
2012	7,782	+0.73%
2017	8,350	+1.42%
2023	8,968	+1.20%
Source: INSEE

== See also ==
- Communes of the Pyrénées-Atlantiques department
