= José César Ferreira Gil =

Portuguese General (1858-1922)

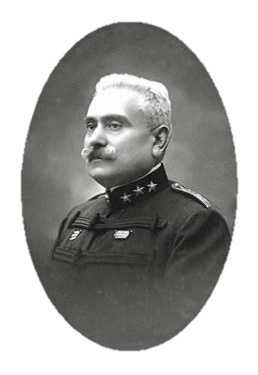
- Born: 1 November 1858; Celorico da Beira, Portugal
- Died: 15 August 1922 (aged 63); Lisbon, Portugal
- Military career
- Allegiance: Portugal
- Branch: Portuguese Army
- Conflicts: World War I; East African Campaign

José César Ferreira Gil (1 November 1858 in Celorico da Beira, Portugal - 15 August 1922 in Lisbon, Portugal) was a Portuguese Army general and a military historian.

During World War I, Ferreira Gil served as the Commander of the Portuguese Forces in Northern Portuguese Mozambique, leading them in combat in the East African Campaign against the German Forces of Paul Emil von Lettow-Vorbeck.
