= Tren Estrella =

Spanish overnight railway service

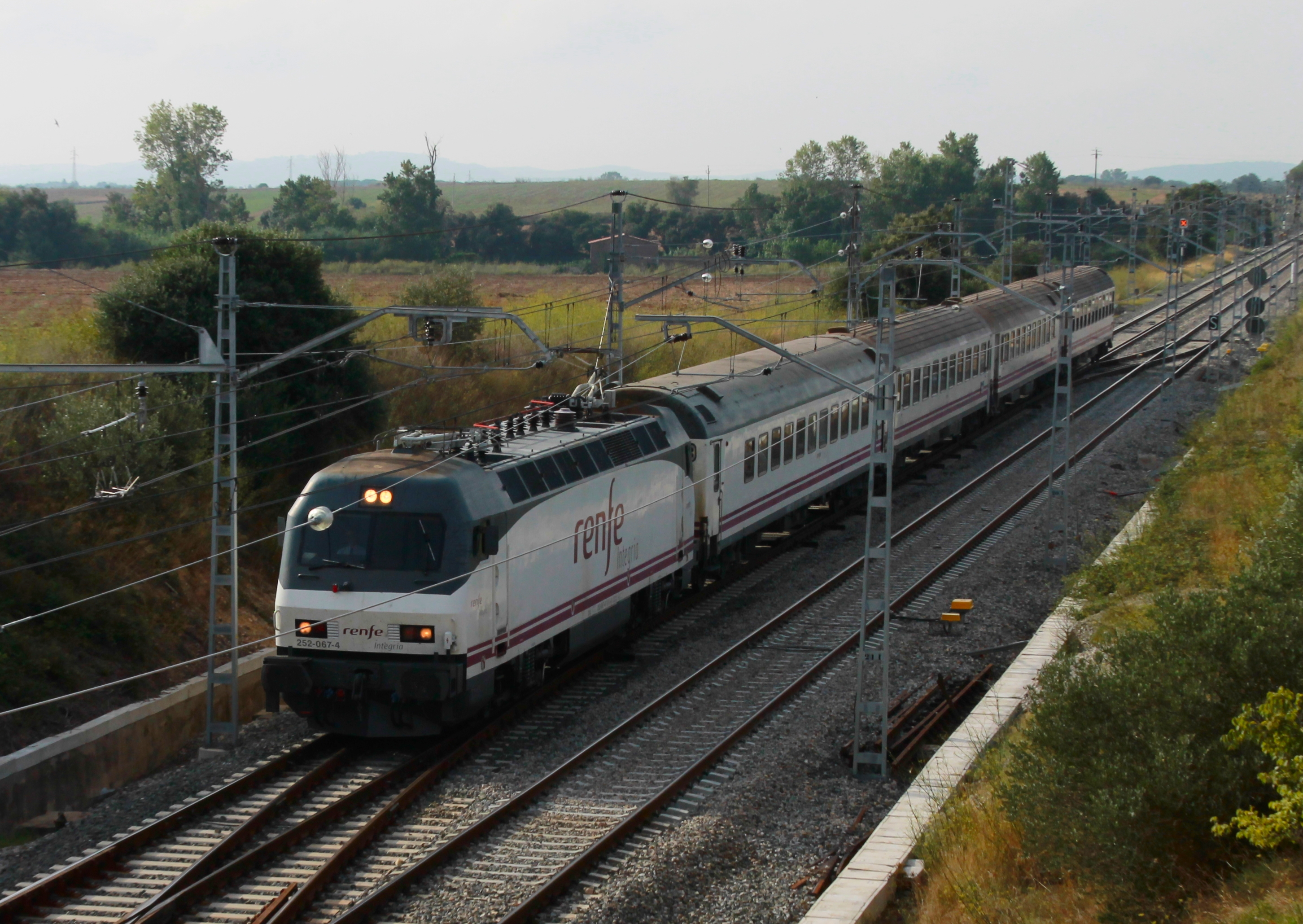
Tren Estrella Costa Brava

El tren Estrella (The Star Train) was a conventional overnight railway service provided in Spain by the national rail network operator Renfe until April 2015. Services left most major Spanish cities in the evening and usually arrived at their destination the following morning.

== Overview ==
It was gradually replaced by the more modern (tilting) Trenhotel and the high speed AVE services

Tren Estrella offered the following classes of accommodation :

- First Class Sleeper (but only in the line Bilbao - Malaga)
- Preferred cabin (which may be shared, but single sex)
- Bed Bunk in shared cabin
- Reclining Seats
- Tourist Seats

== Services ==
=== Substituted services ===
- Estrella Costa Brava: Madrid-Chamartín · Alcalá de Henares · Guadalajara · Sigüenza · Arcos de Jalón · Calatayud · Zaragoza-Delicias · Reus · Tarragona · Sant Vicenç de Calders · Barcelona-Sants · Granollers Centre · Caldes de Malavella · Girona · Flaçà · Figueres · Llançà · Portbou · Cerbère (Direct service cancelled between Madrid and Cerbère but there are about 30 daily high speed services between Madrid and Barcelona mainly serviced by AVE S-103)
- Estrella Picasso:Bilbao-Abando · Miranda de Ebro · Burgos-Rosa de Lima · Valladolid-Campo Grande · Medina del campo · Ávila · Manzanares · Valdepeñas · Linares Baeza · Córdoba Central · Puente Genil · Bobadilla · Málaga-María Zambrano (Direct service cancelled)
- Estrella Costa Vasca: Madrid - Bilbao / Hendaya (by Alvia S-130)
- Estrella Costa Verde: Madrid - Gijón / Santander (by Alvia S-130)
- Estrella del Estrecho: Madrid - Algeciras (by servicio Altaria T-VI)
- Estrella Sol del Levante: Alicante - País Vasco, vía Valencia, Tarragona, Lérida, Zaragoza y Castejón de Ebro, ramas a Bilbao vía Miranda de Ebro e Irún vía Pamplona y San Sebastián (Direct service cancelled)
- Estrella Naranco: Alicante - Gijón (by Alvia S-130)
- Estrella Puerta del Sol: Madrid - París (by Trenhotel Francisco de Goya T-VI)
- Estrella Guadiana: Madrid - Ciudad Real - Badajoz (by Regional Service S-592.2)
- Estrella Ciudad Condal: Madrid - Barcelona (by S-103)
- Estrella Costa de la Luz : Madrid - Cádiz / Huelva (by Alvia S-130)
- Estrella Pirineos : Canfranc - Madrid / Valencia (Direct service cancelled)
- Estrella Costa Cálida: Madrid - Cartagena (by Altaria T-IV)
- Estrella Mar Menor : Barcelona - Cartagena (by Talgo T-VI)
- Estrella Sierra Nevada : Madrid - Granada (by Altaria T-VI)
- Estrella Costa de Almería : Madrid - Almería (by Talgo T-IV)
- Estrella Alcazaba : Cádiz - Sevilla - Almería (Direct service cancelled)
- Estrella Giralda : Madrid - Sevilla (by AVE S-100)
- Estrella Media Luna : Irún / Portbou - Algeciras (Direct service cancelled)
- Estrella Sol de Europa : Santander - Málaga (Direct service cancelled)
- Estrella Costa del Sol : Madrid - Málaga (by servicio Ave S-102)
- Estrella Gibralfaro : Barcelona - Málaga / Granada (by Trenhotel Alhambra T-VI but only to Granada)
- Estrella Guadalquivir : Barcelona - Cádiz ( by a combination of AVE 102 & MD 449)
- Estrella Mediterráneo : Barcelona - Sevilla (by AVE S-112 & Arco García Lorca)
- Estrella Atlántico: Madrid - Ferrol (by Trenhotel Atlántico T-VI)
- Estrella Rías Altas: Madrid - La Coruña, vía Zamora y Orense (by Trenhotel Rías Gallegas T-VI)
- Estrella Rías Bajas: Madrid-Vigo/Pontevedra, vía Zamora y Orense (by Trenhotel Rías Gallegas T-VI)
- Estrella Pío Baroja:
  - Barcelona - Zamora (Direct service cancelled)
  - Barcelona - Bilbao / Hendaya (Substituted by Alvia S-120)
  - Barcelona - Gijón (Sustituido por TH Pío Baroja T-VII)
  - Barcelona - Salamanca (by combined services AVE S-103 & MD 599
- Estrella Galicia: Barcelona - A Coruña / Vigo (by Trenhotel Galicia S-VII)
- Expreso Surexpreso(by Trenhotel Surexpreso T-VI)
