= Caxarias =

- Civil parish
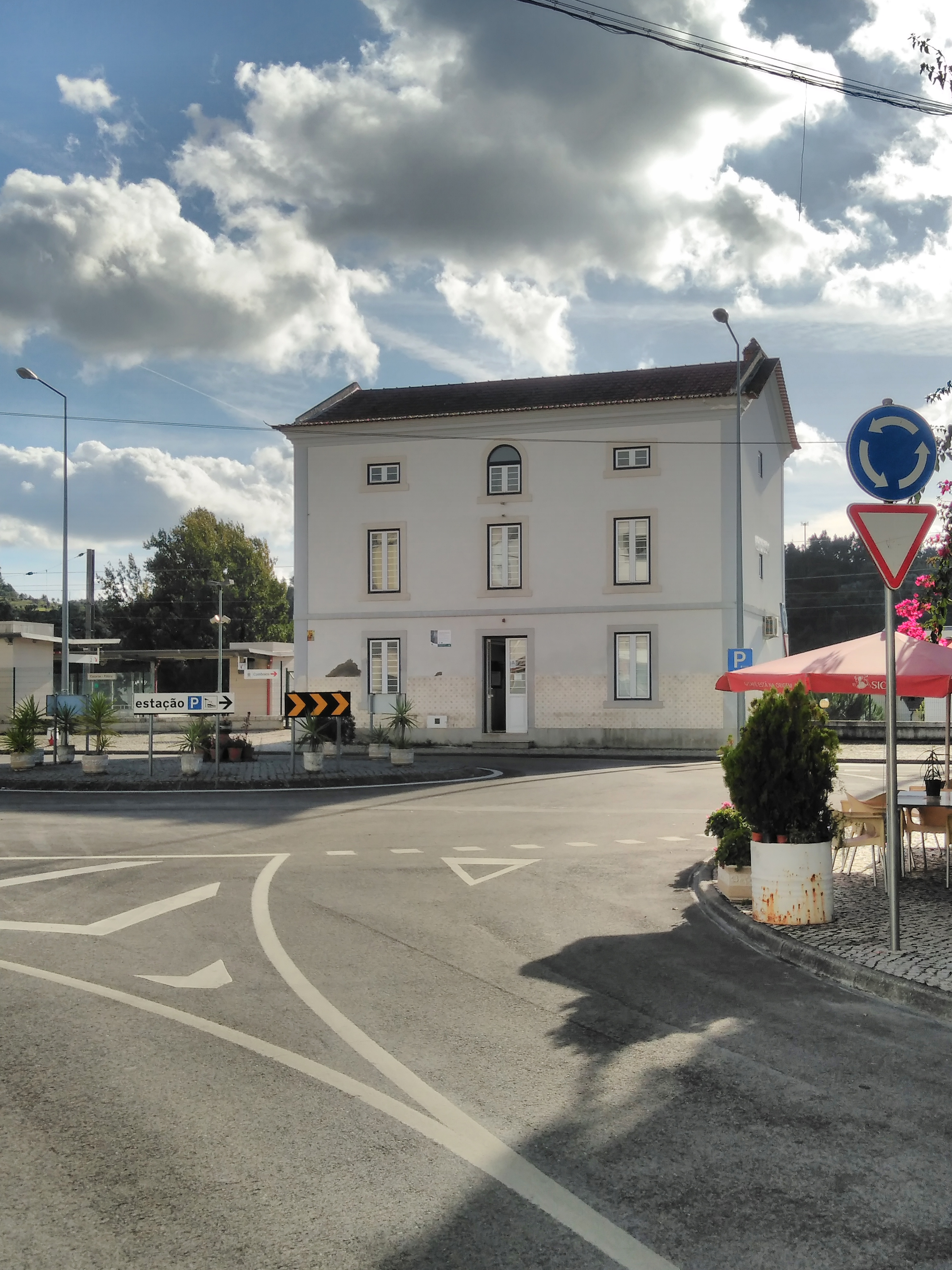

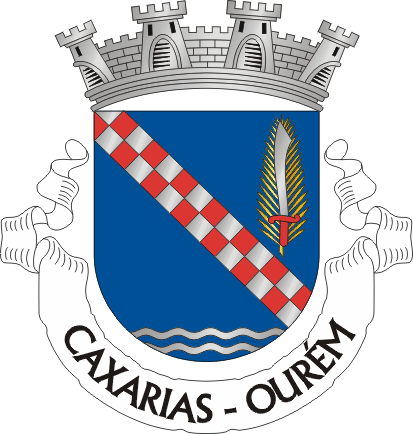
- Coat of arms

- Location in Portugal
- Coordinates: 39.707°N 8.534°W
- Country: Portugal
- Region: Oeste e Vale do Tejo
- Intermunic. comm.: Médio Tejo
- District: Santarém
- Municipality: Ourém

Area
  - Total: 18.03 km^{2} (6.96 sq mi)

Population (2011)
  - Total: 2,166
  - Density: 120.1/km^{2} (311.1/sq mi)
- Time zone: UTC+00:00 (WET)
  - Summer (DST): UTC+01:00 (WEST)

Caxarias (European Portuguese: [kɐʃɐˈɾi.ɐʃ]) is a civil parish and a village in the municipality of Ourém, Portugal. The population in 2011 was 2,166, in an area of 18.03 km².

In January 2026, Storm Kristin caused a catastrophic amount of damage in the Caxarias parish with 1,100 roofs damaged, 97 to 98% of homes damaged, and 90% of the companies damaged.
