= Irun railway station =

Railway station in Irun, Spain

Irún
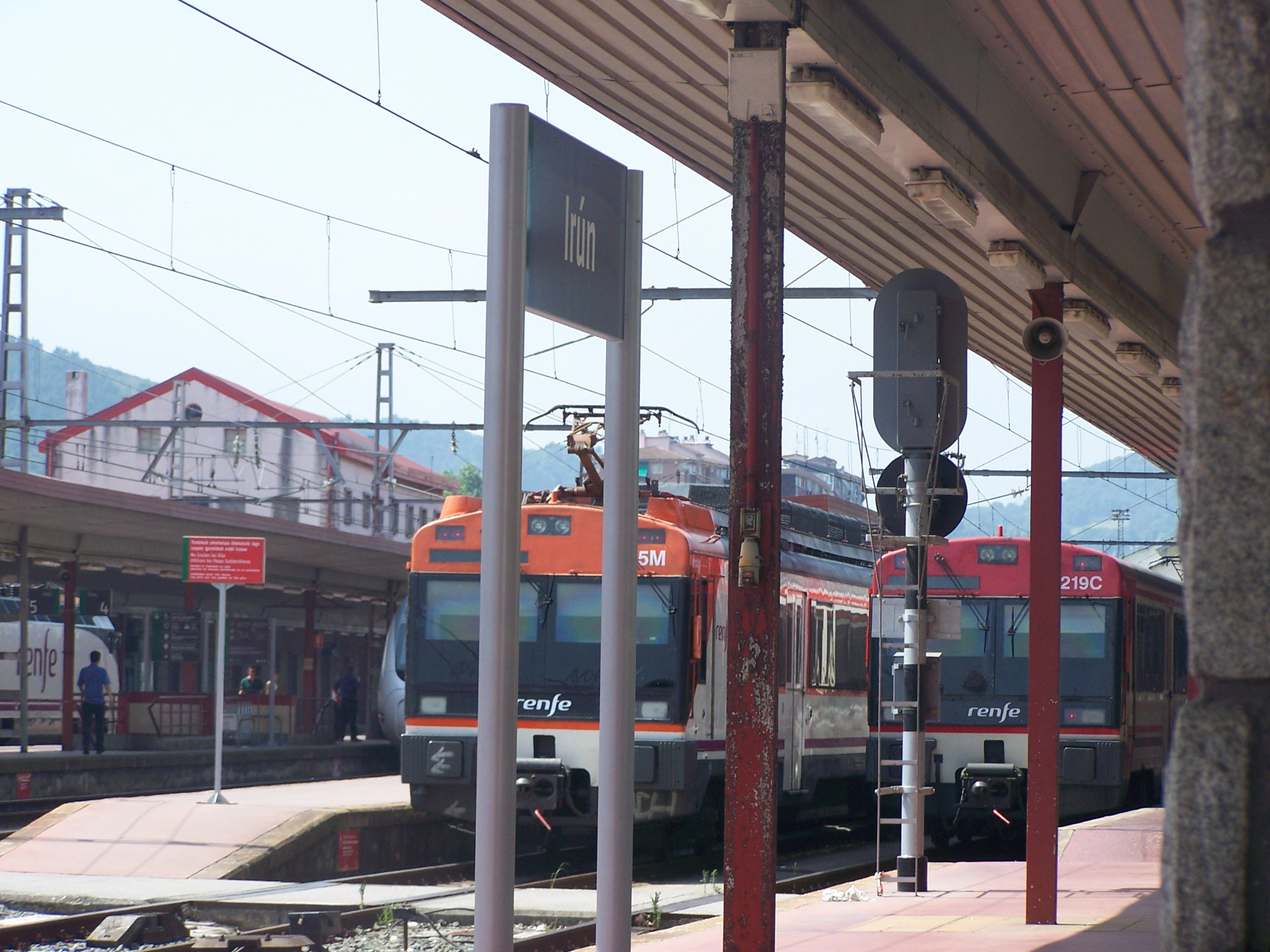

General information
- Location: Irun, Basque Country; Spain
- Coordinates: 43°20′21″N 1°48′1″W
- Owner: adif
- Lines: Bordeaux–Irun railway Madrid–Hendaye railway

Passengers
- 2018: 759,358 ( )
Location

Irun is a railway station in Irun, Basque Country, Spain. The station is located on the Bordeaux - Irun, Bilbao - Hendaye and Madrid–Hendaye railway lines. The station is served by Alvia (High Speed Trains), Regional Exprés, and Cercanías San Sebastián services operated by Renfe.

The station is a border railway station where all trains have to stop, as those coming from/going into France have to change gauge from 1,668 mm (5 ft 5 21/32 in) Iberian gauge to 1,435 mm (4 ft 8 1/2 in) standard gauge. The electric pickup supply also changes here from 3000 V DC (overhead Spain) to 1500 V DC (overhead France). Between the stations of Hendaye and Irun, both track gauges run together.

== Train services ==
The following services currently call at Irun:

| Preceding station | Renfe Operadora | Following station |
|---|---|---|
| San Sebastián towards Madrid Chamartín | Alvia | Terminus |
| San Sebastián towards Barcelona Sants | Alvia | Terminus |
| San Sebastián towards A Coruña | Intercity | Terminus |
| Lezo-Rentería towards Madrid Chamartín | Intercity | Terminus |
| Lezo-Rentería towards Miranda de Ebro | Media Distancia 25 | Terminus |
| Preceding station | Cercanías San Sebastián | Following station |
| Ventas de Irún towards Brinkola | C-1 | Terminus |
