= Celorico da Beira =

- Municipality
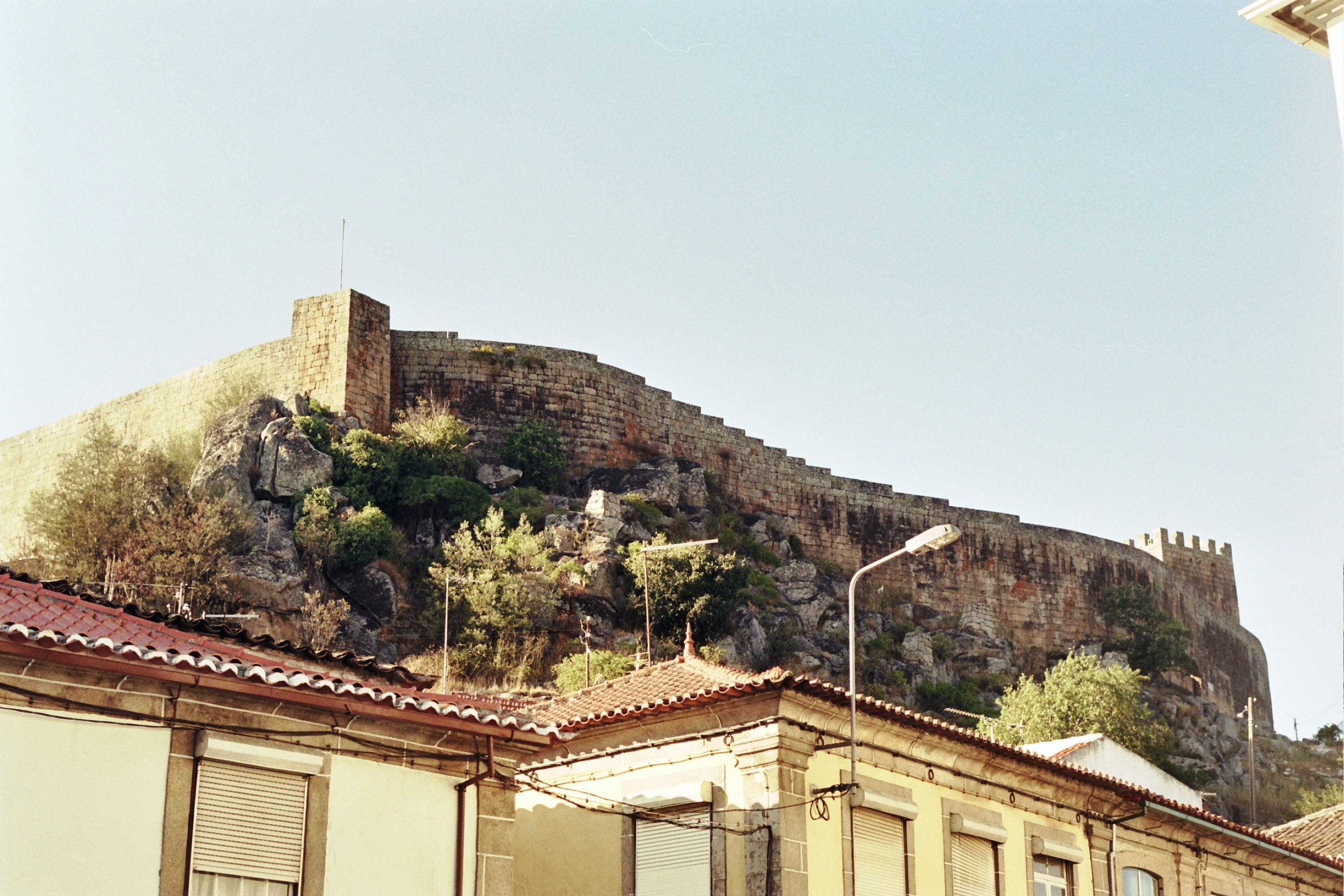
- Celorico da Beira Castle

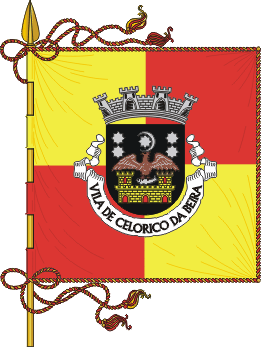
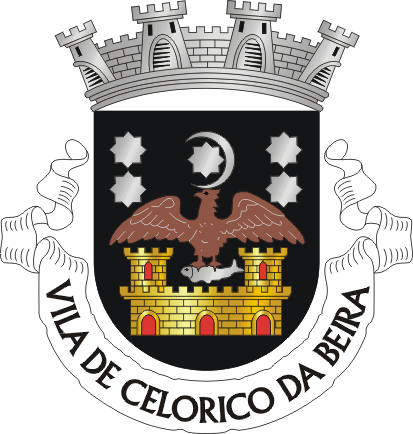
- Flag Coat of arms
- Interactive map of Celorico da Beira
- Location in Portugal
- Coordinates: 40°37′N 7°23′W
- Country: Portugal
- Region: Centro
- Intermunic. comm.: Beiras e Serra da Estrela
- District: Guarda
- Parishes: 16

Government
  - President: Carlos Ascensão (PSD)

Area
  - Total: 247.22 km^{2} (95.45 sq mi)

Population
  - Total: 7,693
  - Density: 31.12/km^{2} (80.60/sq mi)
- Time zone: UTC+00:00 (WET)
  - Summer (DST): UTC+01:00 (WEST)
- Local holiday: May 23
- Website: https://web.archive.org/web/20060414002150/http://www.cm-celoricodabeira.pt/

Celorico da Beira (European Portuguese pronunciation: [sɨluˈɾiku ðɐ ˈβɐjɾɐ]) is a municipality in Guarda District in Portugal. The municipality population in 2011 was 7,693, in an area of 247.22 km^{2}.

Main town: Celorico da Beira, near the Mondego River.

Principal monument: Celorico da Beira Castle. Train station: Celorico da Beira, linha da Beira Alta. The present Mayor is Carlos Ascensão, elected by the Social Democratic Party. The municipal holiday is May 23.

== Parishes ==
Administratively, the municipality is divided into 16 civil parishes (freguesias):

- Açores e Velosa
- Baraçal
- Carrapichana
- Casas do Soeiro
- Celorico (São Pedro e Santa Maria) e Vila Boa do Mondego
- Cortiçô da Serra, Vide Entre Vinhas e Salgueirais
- Forno Telheiro
- Lajeosa do Mondego
- Linhares
- Maçal do Chão
- Mesquitela
- Minhocal
- Prados
- Rapa e Cadafaz
- Ratoeira
- Vale de Azares

== Notable people ==
- Abraham Miguel Cardoso (1626–1706), a Jewish-Sabbatean activist
- João Cabral (1599-??) a Jesuit missionary to Bhutan.
- José César Ferreira Gil (1858-1922) an Army general and a military historian.
- Artur de Sacadura Freire Cabral (1881–1924) a Portuguese aviation pioneer.
- Alfredo Cunha (born 1953) a Portuguese photographer and photojournalist
- Paulo Gomes (born 1973) a Portuguese marathon runner.
