= Hendaye station =

Railway station in Hendaye, France

Hendaye
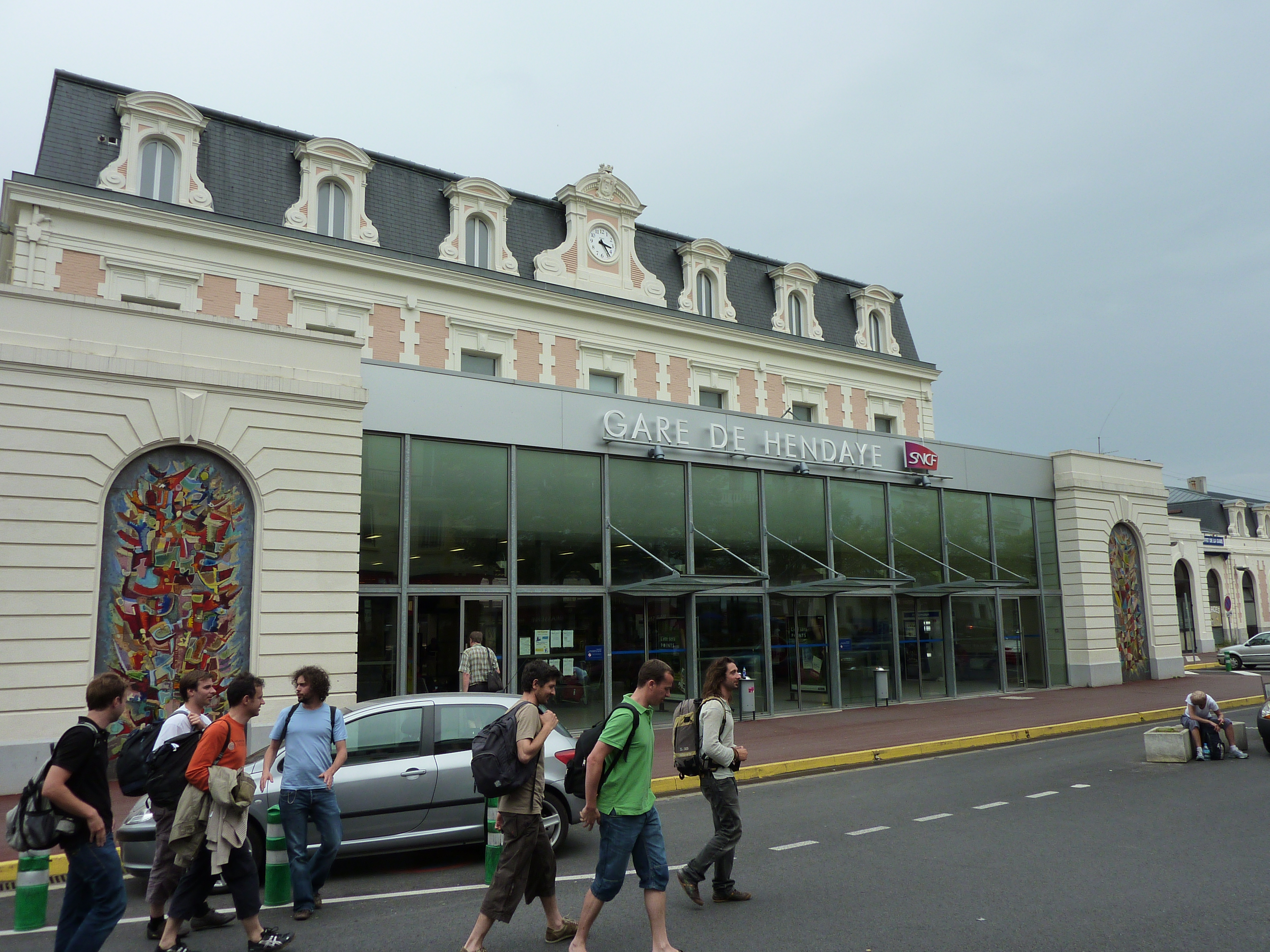
- A view of the passenger building of Hendaye railway station

General information
- Location: Boulevard du Général de Gaulle, 64700; Hendaye; France
- Coordinates: 43.3531°N 1.7819°W
- Elevation: 9 m (29.5 ft)
- Owner: RFF / SNCF
- Operator: SNCF
- Line: Bordeaux–Irun
- Train operators: TGV; Intercités; TER - Nouvelle-Aquitaine; Renfe; Fret SNCF

Other information
- Station code: 87677005
Services
Preceding station	SNCF	Following station
Terminus	TGV inOui	Saint-Jean-de-Luz-Ciboure towards Montparnasse
Terminus	Intercités	Saint-Jean-de-Luz-Ciboure towards Toulouse
Saint-Jean-de-Luz-Ciboure towards Paris-Austerlitz	Intercités (night)	Terminus
Preceding station	TER Nouvelle-Aquitaine	Following station
Les Deux-Jumeaux towards Bordeaux	51	Terminus
Preceding station	Renfe Operadora	Following station
Irun towards Madrid Chamartín	Alvia	Terminus
Irun towards Barcelona Sants	Alvia	Terminus
Irun towards A Coruña	Intercity	Terminus
Preceding station	Euskotren Trena	Following station
Irun Ficoba towards Lasarte-Oria	Line T1	Terminus
Location

Hendaye station (French: Gare d'Hendaye) is a railway station in Hendaye, France, on the Bordeaux-Irun and Madrid-Hendaye lines. The station is served by TGV high speed trains, Intercités de nuit night trains, Intercités long distance and TER local services operated by the SNCF, Trenhotel and Arco services operated by Renfe, and EuskoTren services.

The Euskotren 1,000 mm (3 ft 3 3/8 in) metre gauge services operate from a station on the forecourt of the SNCF station, for which separate ticketing is required.

The station is a border railway station where all trains have to stop, as those coming from/going into Spain have to change gauge from 1,435 mm (4 ft 8 1/2 in) standard gauge to 1,668 mm (5 ft 5 21/32 in) Iberian gauge. The electric supply also changes here from 1500 V DC (overhead France) to 3000 V DC (overhead Spain). Between the stations of Hendaye and Irun, both track gauges run together.

== Train services (French) ==
The following services currently call at Hendaye:

- high speed services (TGV) Paris - Bordeaux - Hendaye
- intercity services (Intercités) Hendaye - Bayonne - Pau - Tarbes - Toulouse
- local service (TER Aquitaine) Bordeaux - Dax - Bayonne - Hendaye

== See also ==
- Meeting at Hendaye – the only meeting between Adolf Hitler and Francisco Franco, which took place at this station on 23 October 1940
- Variable gauge
