= Bordeaux–Irun railway =

Rail line in France and Spain

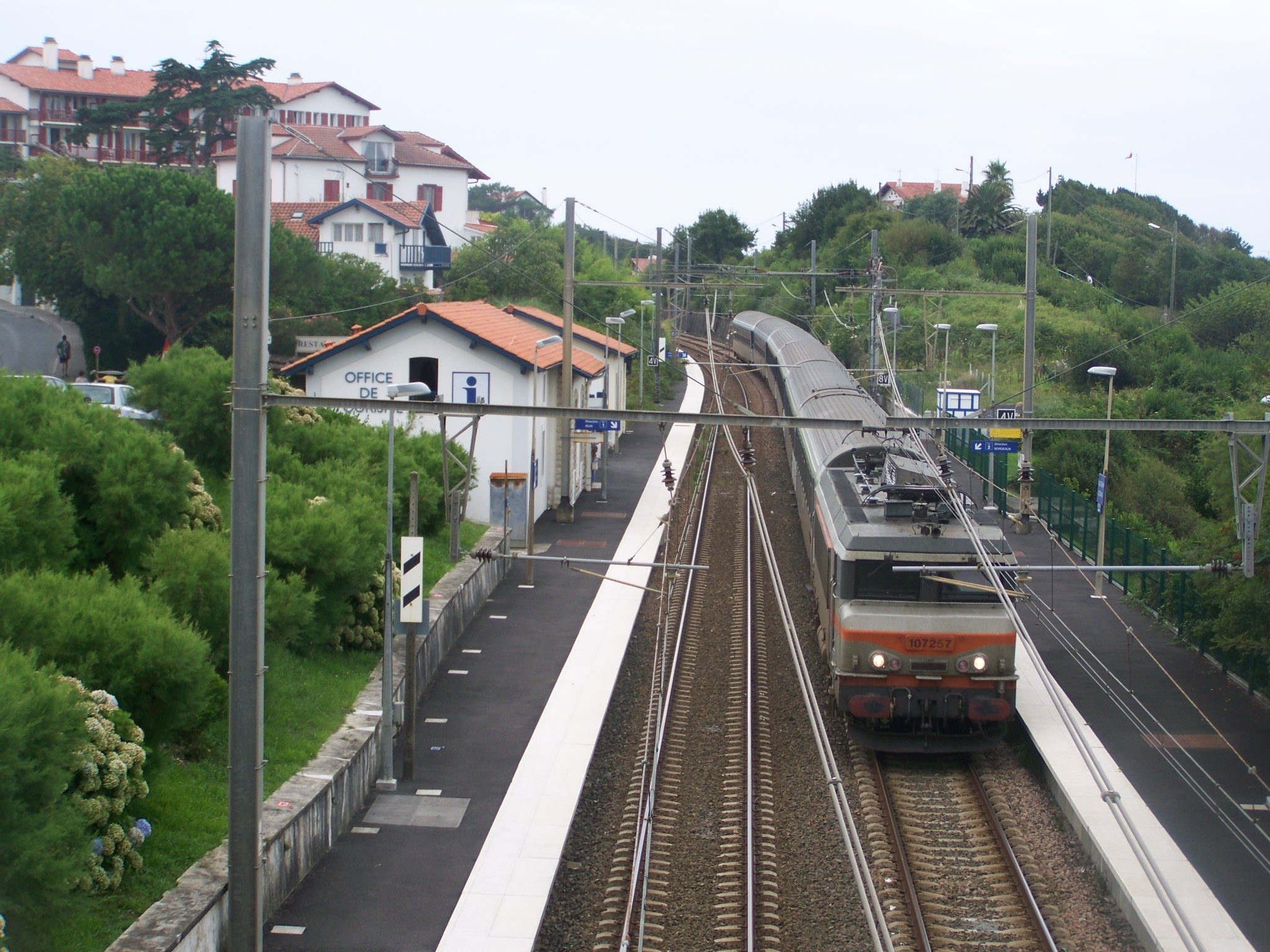
- Guethary station along the Bordeaux–Irun railway

Overview
- Status: Operational
- Owner: RFF
- Locale: France (Nouvelle-Aquitaine), Spain (Basque Country)
- Termini: Bordeaux-Saint-Jean station; Irun railway station

Service
- System: SNCF
- Operator(s): SNCF

History
- Opened: 1841-1864

Technical
- Line length: 235 km (146 mi)
- Number of tracks: Double track
- Track gauge: 1,435 mm (4 ft 8 1/2 in) standard gauge
- Electrification: 1.5 kV DC

The railway from Bordeaux to Irun is an important French 235-kilometre long railway line, that connects the southwestern city Bordeaux to northern Spain. The railway was opened in several stages between 1841 and 1864.

== Route ==
The Bordeaux–Irun railway leaves the Bordeaux-Saint-Jean station in southwestern direction. The first approximately 145 km of its course runs through the Landes forest. At Lamothe the line to Arcachon branches off, and the line turns south. At Dax the line leaves the Landes forest, and the line to Puyoô and Pau branches off. The railway continues downstream along the right bank of the river Adour until Saubusse, where it turns west towards the Atlantic coast, and then south. It crosses the river Adour in Bayonne, and turns southwest. It passes along the ocean resorts Biarritz and Saint-Jean-de-Luz. It crosses the Spanish border between Hendaye and Irun, where the railway ends. France and Spain have different rail gauges (standard gauge and Iberian gauge, resp.), which requires change of trains. The section between Hendaye and Irun has tracks with both gauges.

=== Main stations ===
The main stations on the Bordeaux–Irun railway are:

- Bordeaux-Saint-Jean station
- Dax station
- Bayonne station
- Hendaye station
- Irun railway station

== History ==
The railway was built by the Compagnie des Chemins de fer du Midi and its predecessor Compagnie du chemin de fer de Bordeaux à La Teste. The first section that was opened in 1841 led from Bordeaux to Lamothe, a section that is shared with the railway to Arcachon. The line was extended to Dax in 1854. The section between Dax and Bayonne was opened in 1855. Finally in 1864 the line was extended from Bayonne to the Spanish border town Irun.

== Services ==
The Bordeaux–Irun railway is used by the following passenger services:

- TGV from Paris to Irun on the whole line, and from Paris to Tarbes on the section between Bordeaux and Dax
- Intercités from Hendaye to Toulouse on the section between Bayonne and Hendaye
- TER Nouvelle-Aquitaine regional services on the section between Bordeaux and Hendaye
