= Venta de Baños–Gijón railway =

Railway line in Spain

Overview
- Status: Operational
- Owner: Adif
- Termini: Venta de Baños; Gijón

Service
- Operator(s): Renfe Operadora

History
- Opened: 15 August 1884

Technical
- Line length: 304.9 km (189.5 mi)
- Track gauge: 1,668 mm (5 ft 5 21/32 in) Iberian gauge

The Venta de Baños–Gijón railway is a Spanish railway linking Gijón, Asturias to the rest of the mainline Spanish rail network.

== Route ==
The line branches from the Madrid–Hendaye railway at Venta de Baños, and serves Palencia, León and Oviedo before reaching Gijón. At León, the León–A Coruña railway starts.

== Services ==
The Cercanías Asturias commuter rail service operates to Puente de los Fierres from Gijón; and a Renfe Regional service runs the full length of the line from Gijón to Valladolid-Campo Grande, taking 5 hours and 43 minutes.

== Future ==
The line is to be extended from its current Gijón terminus further into the city to Cabueñes via a tunnel with underground stations. This project, known as Metrotrén Asturias, stalled in 2006, but is due to resume in 2019 and conclude in 2023.
