= C-5a (Cercanías Asturias) =

Spanish commuter rail service

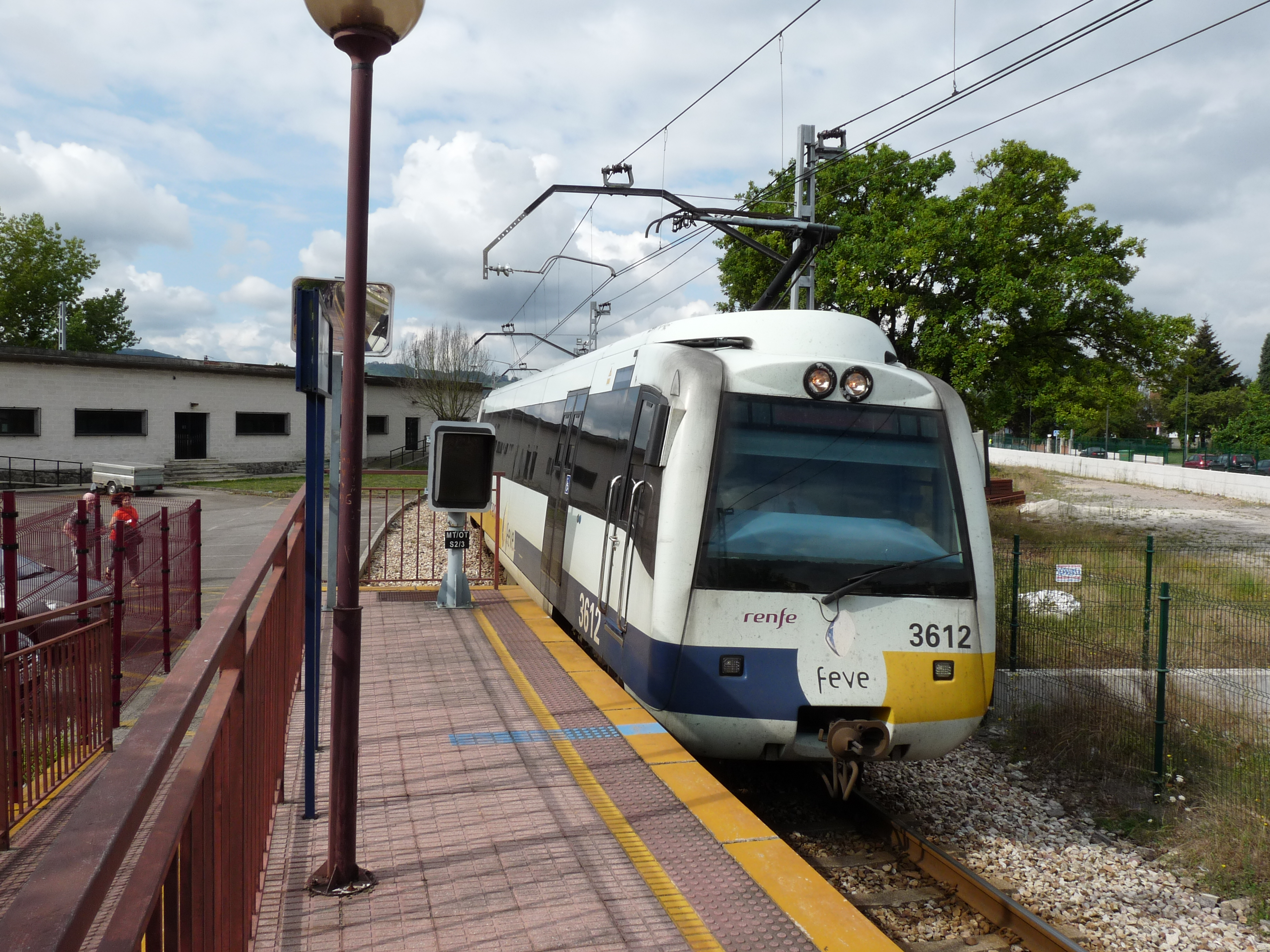
- A Renfe 3600 Series train on C-5a line going through El Berrón.

Overview
- Service type: Commuter rail
- System: Cercanías Asturias
- Status: Operational
- Locale: Asturias, Spain
- Current operator: Renfe Operadora

Route
- Termini: Gijón; Oviedo
- Stops: 6
- Lines used: Gijón−Laviana railway line Oviedo−Infiesto railway line

Technical
- Track gauge: 1,000 mm (3 ft 3 3/8 in) metre gauge
- Electrification: yes 1500kV AC overhead line
- Track owner: Adif

The C-5a line is a rail service of Cercanías Asturias commuter rail network, operated by Renfe Operadora. Its termini are Gijón and Oviedo stations.

== History ==
This line was born in 2008 when the defunct FEVE inaugurated a direct service that connected Oviedo and Gijón in 30 minutes without any intermediate stops. Since 2010, this service also stops at Noreña, El Berrón, Colloto/Cualloto and Parque Principado stations. In 2011, the old el Humedal Station was demolished and the train service was reallocated to a provisional station until an intermodal station is built in the future. Following the integration of Feve into Renfe Feve in 2012 (renamed as Renfe Cercanías AM in 2021), due to the lack of investment, infrastructure has been deteriorating and the poor conditions of the rolling stock have repeatedly caused service cancellations in the past. years. This unreliability has also caused a dramastic reduction in the number of daily passengers.

== Rolling Stock ==
Current:

- 3600 Series (former FEVE 3600 Series)
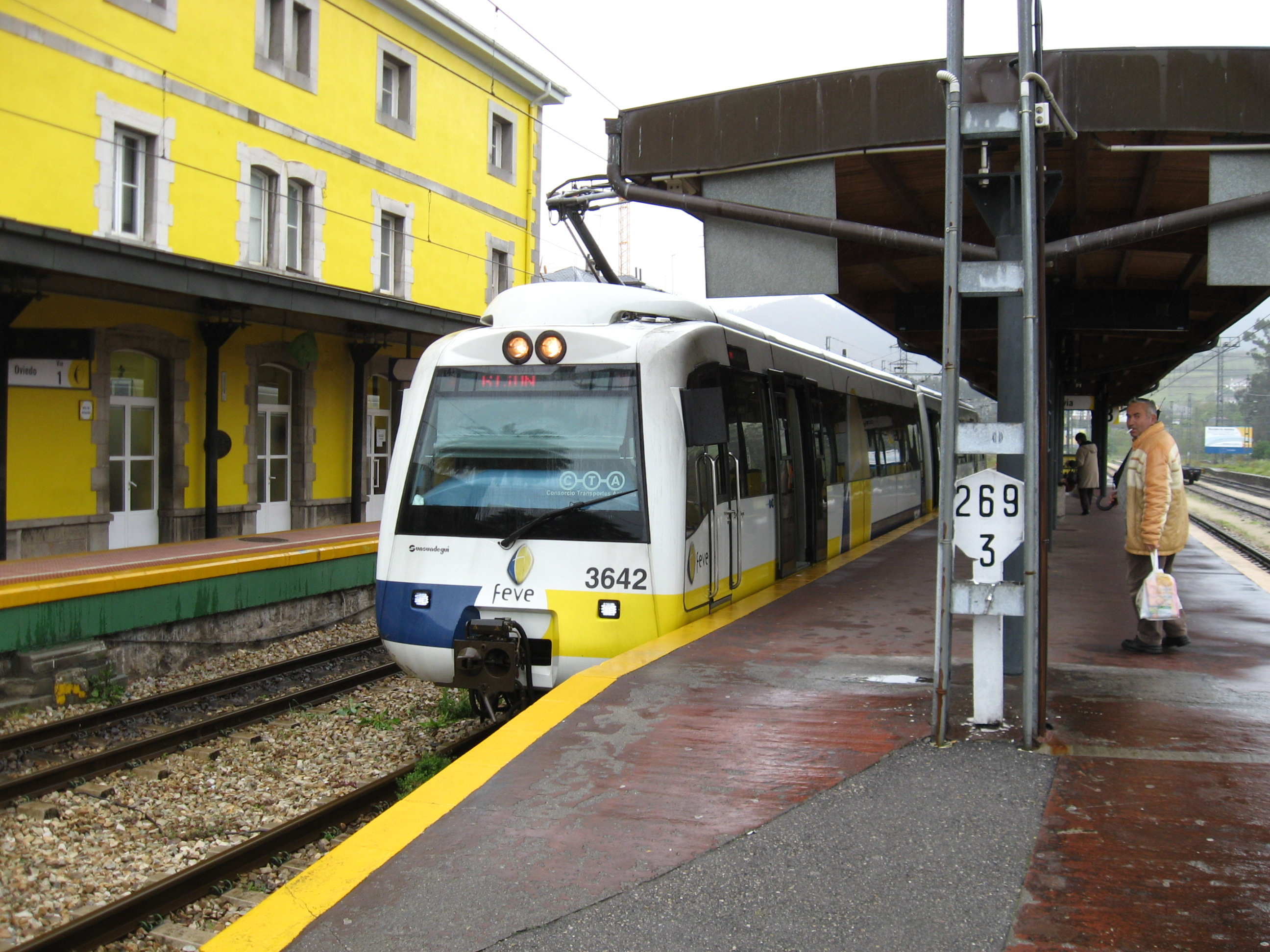
3600 Series

== Stations ==
Station	Transfers	Transfers (other services)	Location	Fare Zone
Gijón		Regional	Gijón	4D
Noreña			Noreña	2/3
El Berrón		Regional	Siero	1/2
Colloto/Cualloto		Regional	Siero	1
Parque Principado			Siero	1
Oviedo		Regional	Oviedo	1
