= RMS Asturias =

RMS Asturias may refer to the following ships:

- RMS Asturias (1907)
- RMS Asturias (1925)

== See also ==
- Asturias (disambiguation)
