= C-6 (Cercanías Asturias) =

Spanish commuter rail service

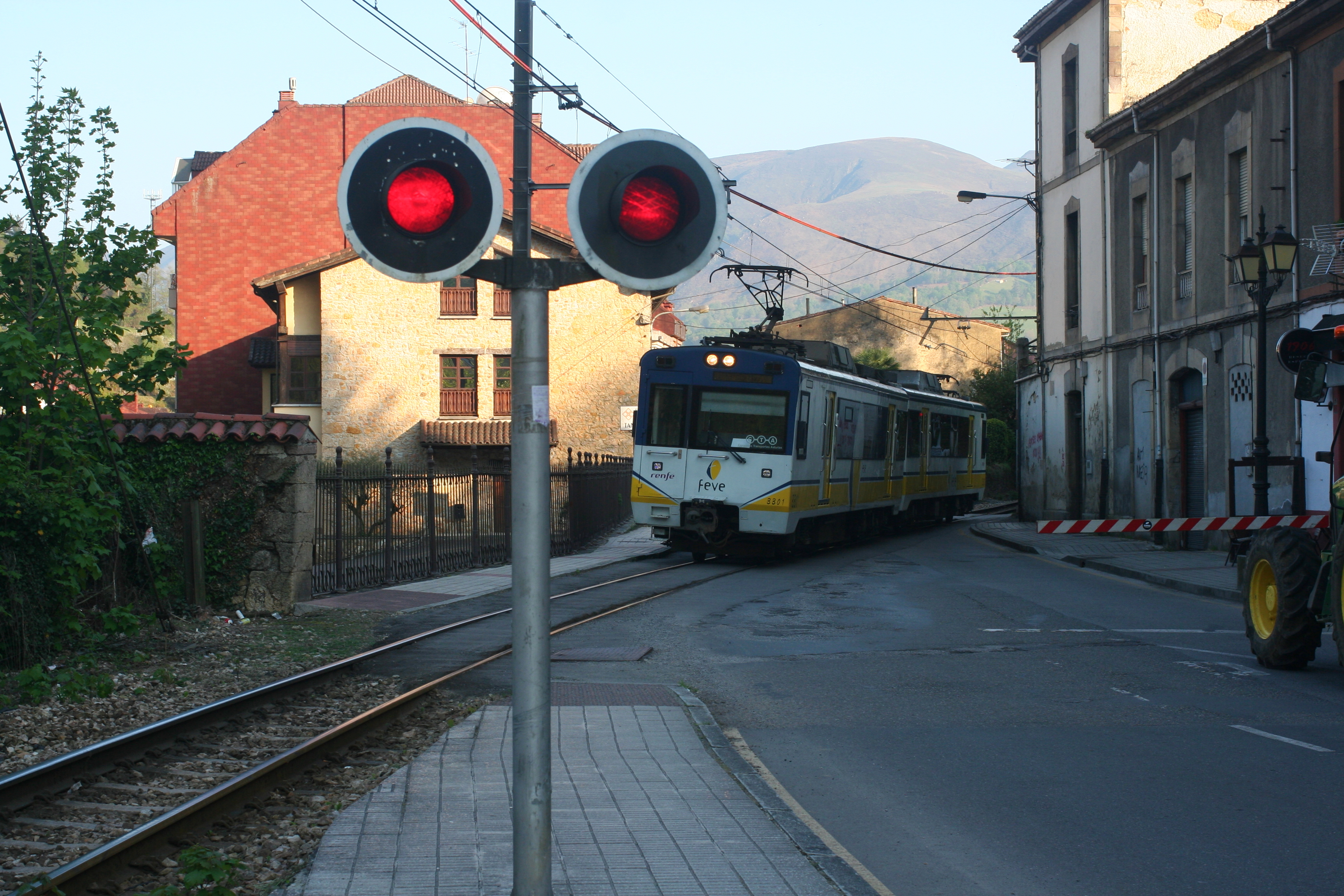
- A Renfe 3300 Series train on C-6 line passing through a level crossing in L'Infiestu.

Overview
- Service type: Commuter rail
- System: Cercanías Asturias
- Status: Operational
- Locale: Asturias, Spain
- Current operator: Renfe Operadora

Route
- Termini: Oviedo; L'Infiestu apeadero
- Stops: 20
- Distance travelled: 47.70 km (29.64 mi)
- Line used: Oviedo−Llanes railway line

Technical
- Track gauge: 1,000 mm (3 ft 3 3/8 in) metre gauge
- Electrification: yes 1500kV AC overhead line
- Track owner: Adif

The C-6 line is a rail service of Cercanías Asturias commuter rail network, operated by Renfe Operadora. Its termini are Oviedo and L'Infiestu stations.

== History ==
Ferrocarriles Económicos de Asturias was constituted in 1887 and presented a plan to the Spanish Parliament in which it expressed its desire to build a railway line that linked Oviedo and L'Infiestu. Construction works were slowed down since local tenants showed their discrepancies with the sum that they were offered as a compensation for the seizure of their lands. Finally, the service started in 1891. In the following decades this line was expanded to Llanes. It transported both passengers and mining products.

In 1972, the ownership of this line was transferred to FEVE, a government-owned company established with the objective of operating all narrow-gauge railway lines within Spain.

Following the integration of Feve into Renfe Feve in 2012 (renamed as Renfe Cercanías AM in 2021), due to the lack of investment, infrastructure has been deteriorating and the poor conditions of the rolling stock have repeatedly caused service cancellations in the past years. Cases like trains burning spontaneusly, trees falling in the railway lines and cattle colliding with the trains have dramatically increased. Also, due to the new digital ASFA security system, trains are slower than a hundred years ago. Consequently, the number of passengers has dropped during the last decades.

== Future ==
According to the Plan de Cercanías by the Spanish Ministry for Infrastructure, a signalling system renewal is scheduled for implementation in the coming years. It is also foreseen that the railway line will undergo a comprehensive renewal between Colloto/Cualloto and L'Infiestu, with the addition of a second track in the La Carrera-La Pola Siero section.

== Rolling Stock ==
Current:

- 3300 Series (former FEVE 3300 Series)
- 3500 Series (former FEVE 3500 Series)
- 3600 Series (former FEVE 3600 Series)
- 527 Series (former FEVE 2700 Series)
- 529 Series (former FEVE 2900 Series)
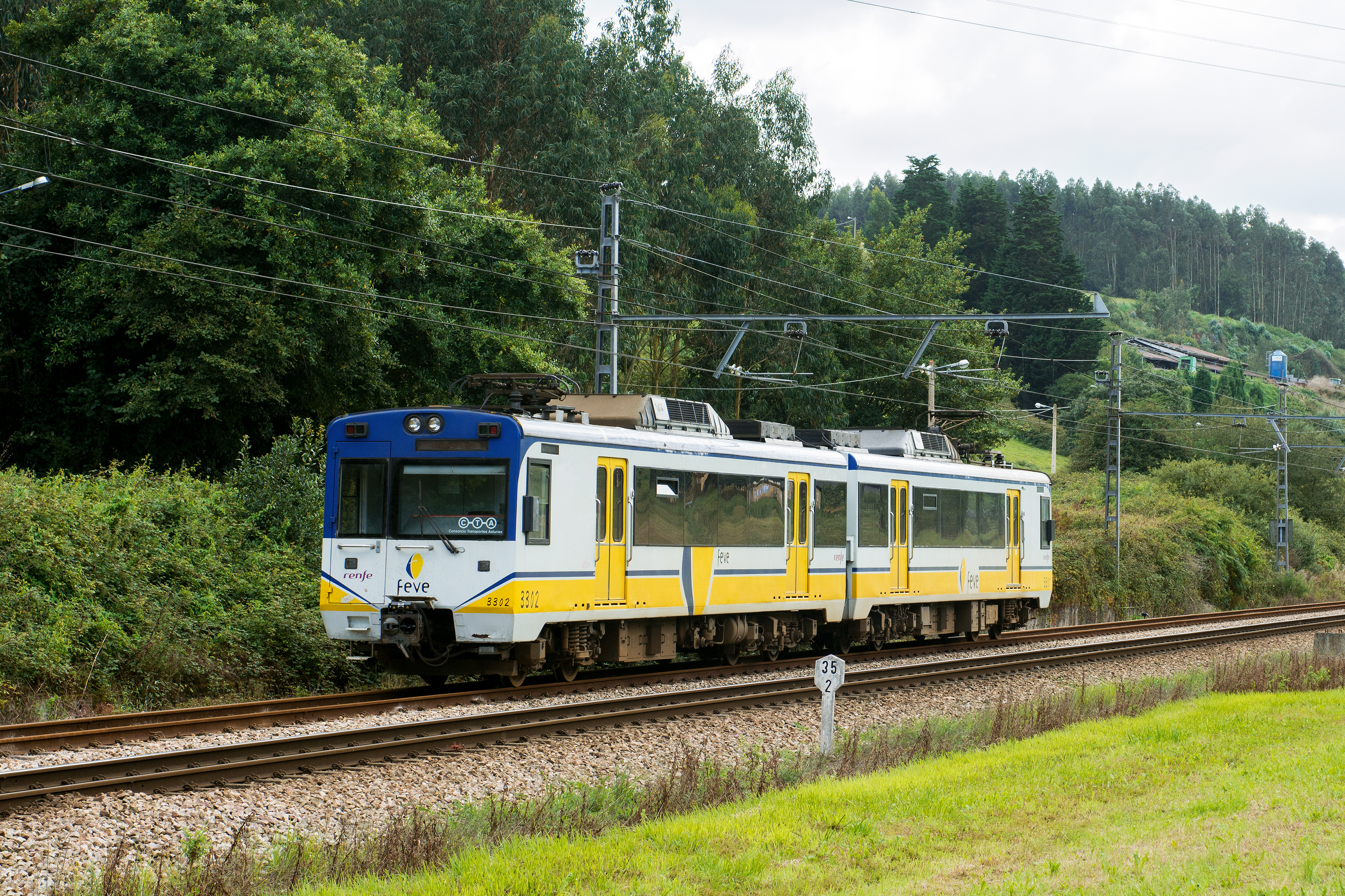
3300 Series

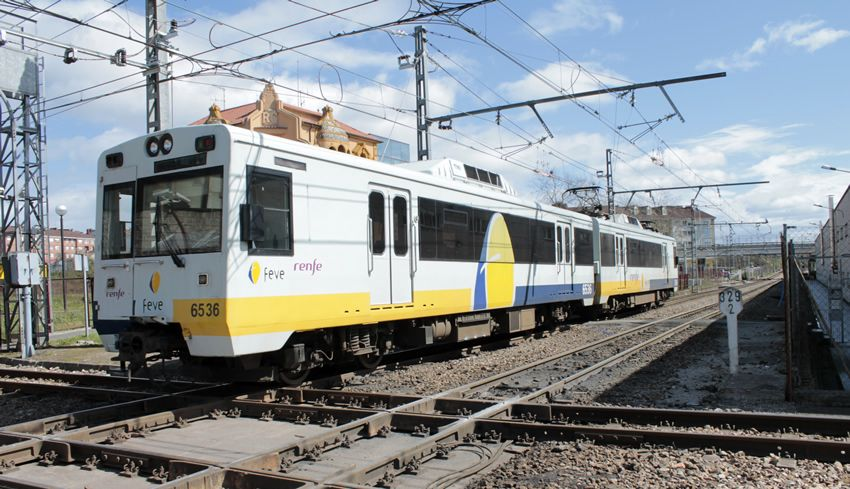
3500 Series

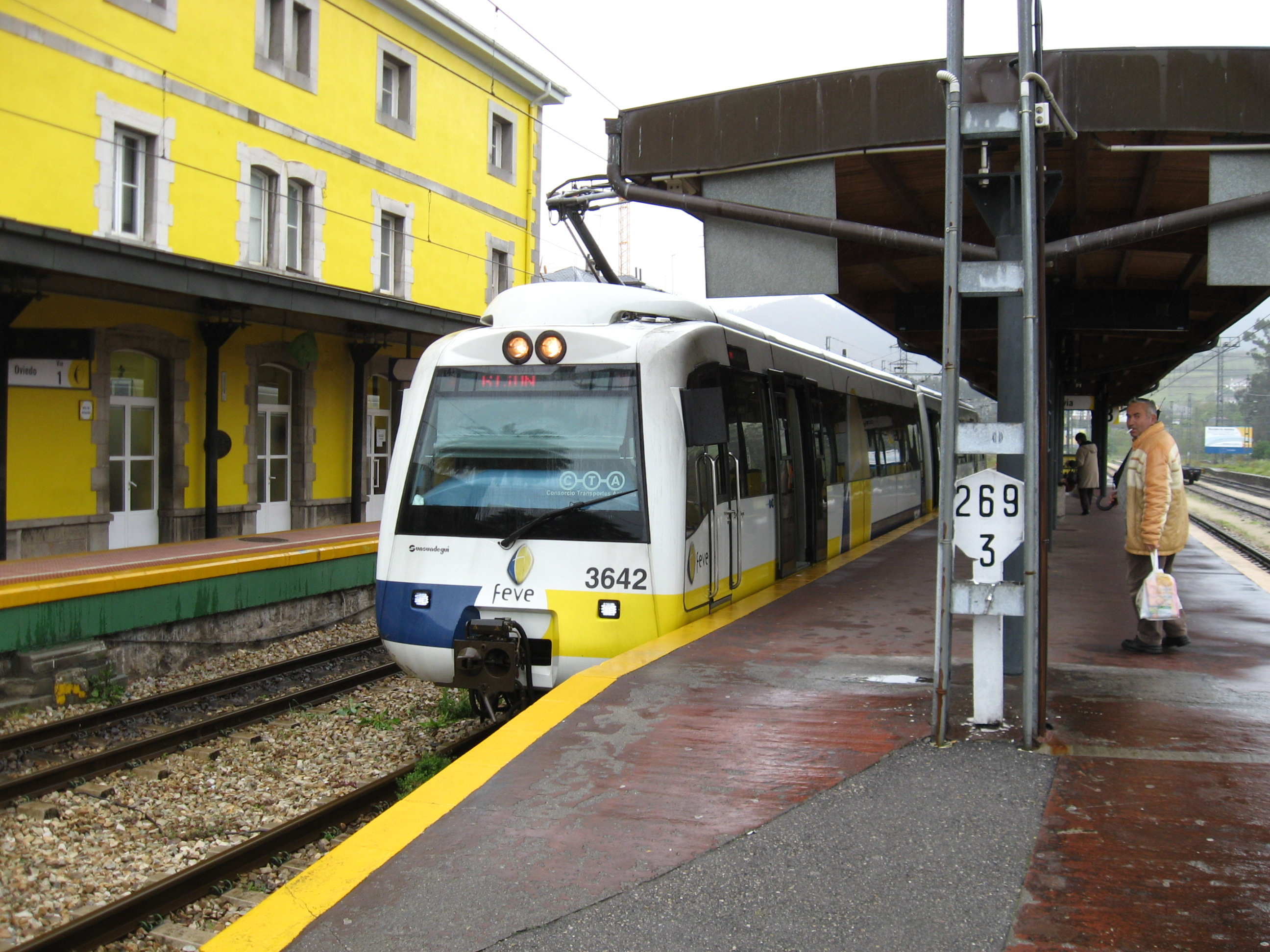
3600 Series

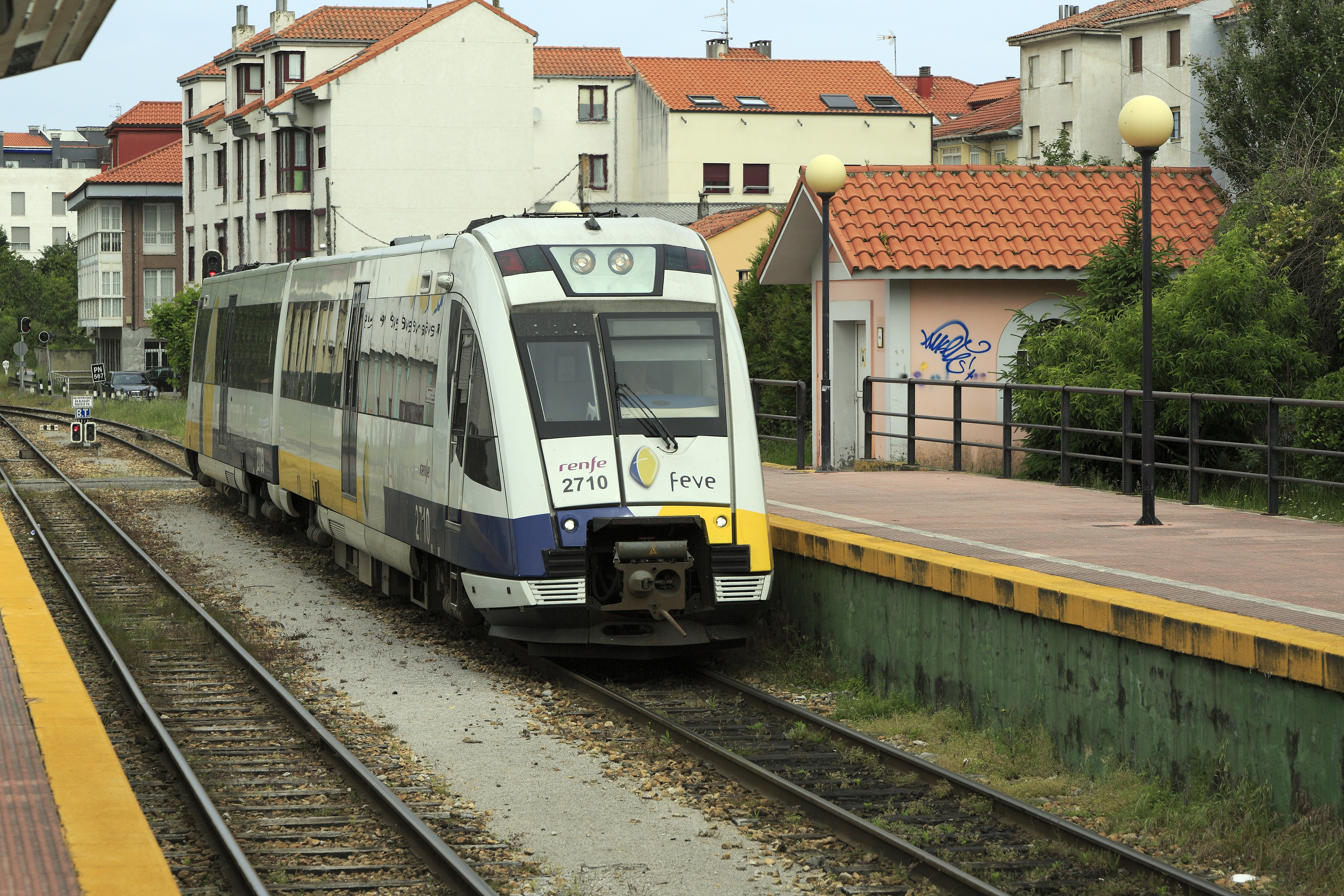
527 Series

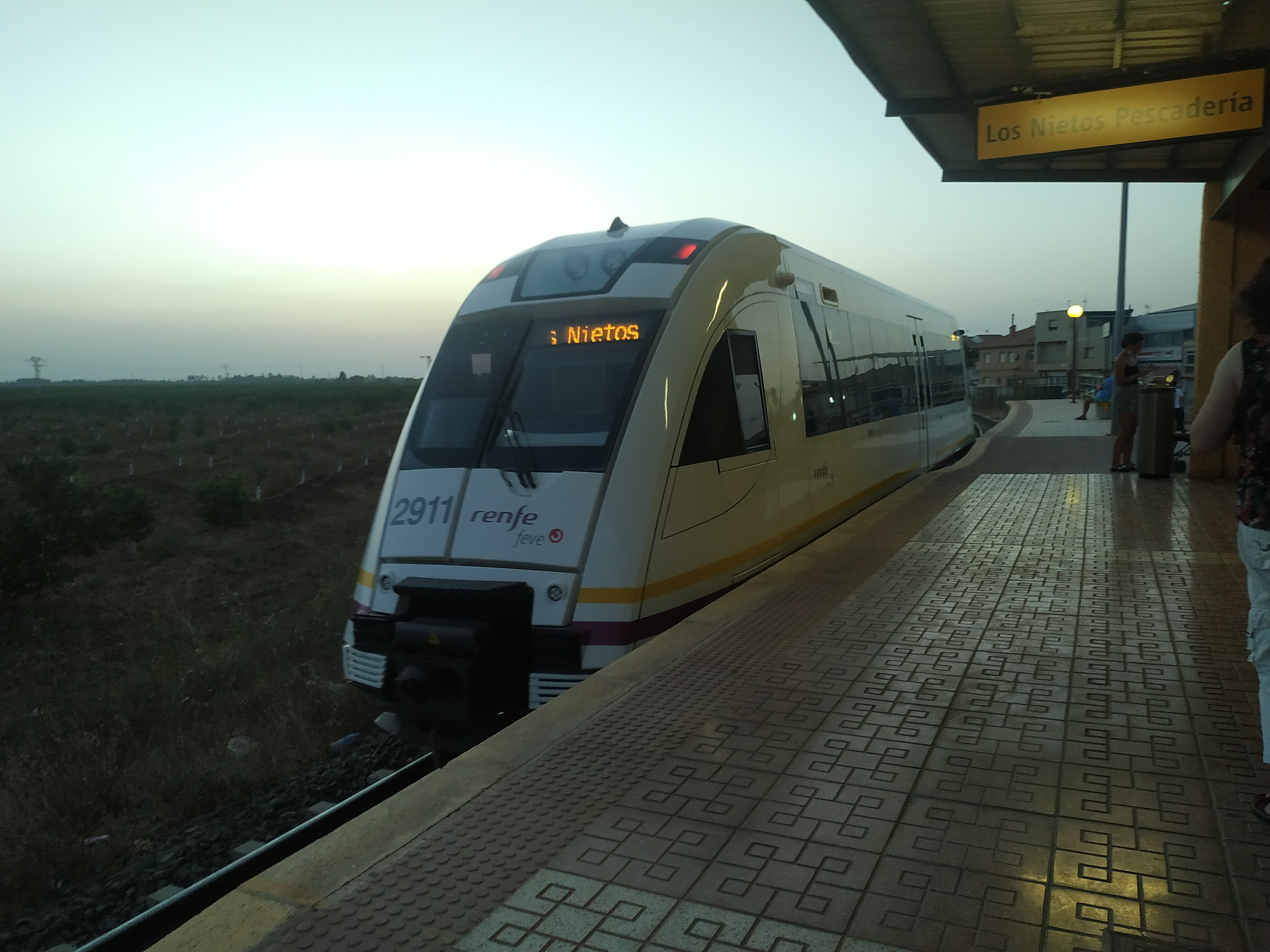
529 Series

== Stations ==
Station	Transfers	Transfers (other services)	Location	Fare Zone
Oviedo		Regional	Oviedo	1
La Corredoria			Oviedo	1
Parque Principado			Siero	1
Colloto/Cualloto		Regional	Siero	1
Meres			Siero	1
Fonciello			Siero	1
El Berrón		Regional	Siero	1/2
La Carrera			Siero	2
La Pola Siero		Regional	Siero	2
Los Corros			Siero	2
Lieres		Regional	Siero	2/3
El Remediu			Nava	3
Llames			Nava	3
Nava		Regional	Nava	3/4
Fuentesanta/Huentesanta		Regional	Nava	4
Ceceda/Cecea		Regional	Nava	4
Carancos		Regional	Nava	4
Pintueles		Regional	Piloña	4
L'Infiestu		Regional	Piloña	4
L'Infiestu (apeadero)		Regional	Piloña	4
