= Príncipe de Asturias (disambiguation) =

Príncipe de Asturias is the title given to the heir to the Spanish throne.

Príncipe de Asturias may also refer to:

== Awards ==
- Princess of Asturias Awards, a series of prizes awarded to individuals, entities or organizations from around the world who make notable achievements in the sciences, humanities, and public affairs.

== Geography ==
- Príncipe de Asturias Peak, a 4680 m peak in Vinson Massif, Sentinel Range in Ellsworth Mountains, Antarctica,

== Ships ==
- Spanish aircraft carrier Príncipe de Asturias, an aircraft carrier of the Spanish Navy launched in 1988 and scrapped in 2017
- Spanish ship Principe de Asturias (1794), a 112-gun ship of the line of the Spanish Navy launched in 1794 and foundered in 1814
- Príncipe de Asturias (ocean liner), a Spanish liner launched in 1914 and sunk off Brazil with heavy loss of life in 1916

== See also ==
- Asturias (disambiguation)
