= C-5 (Cercanías Asturias) =

Spanish commuter rail service

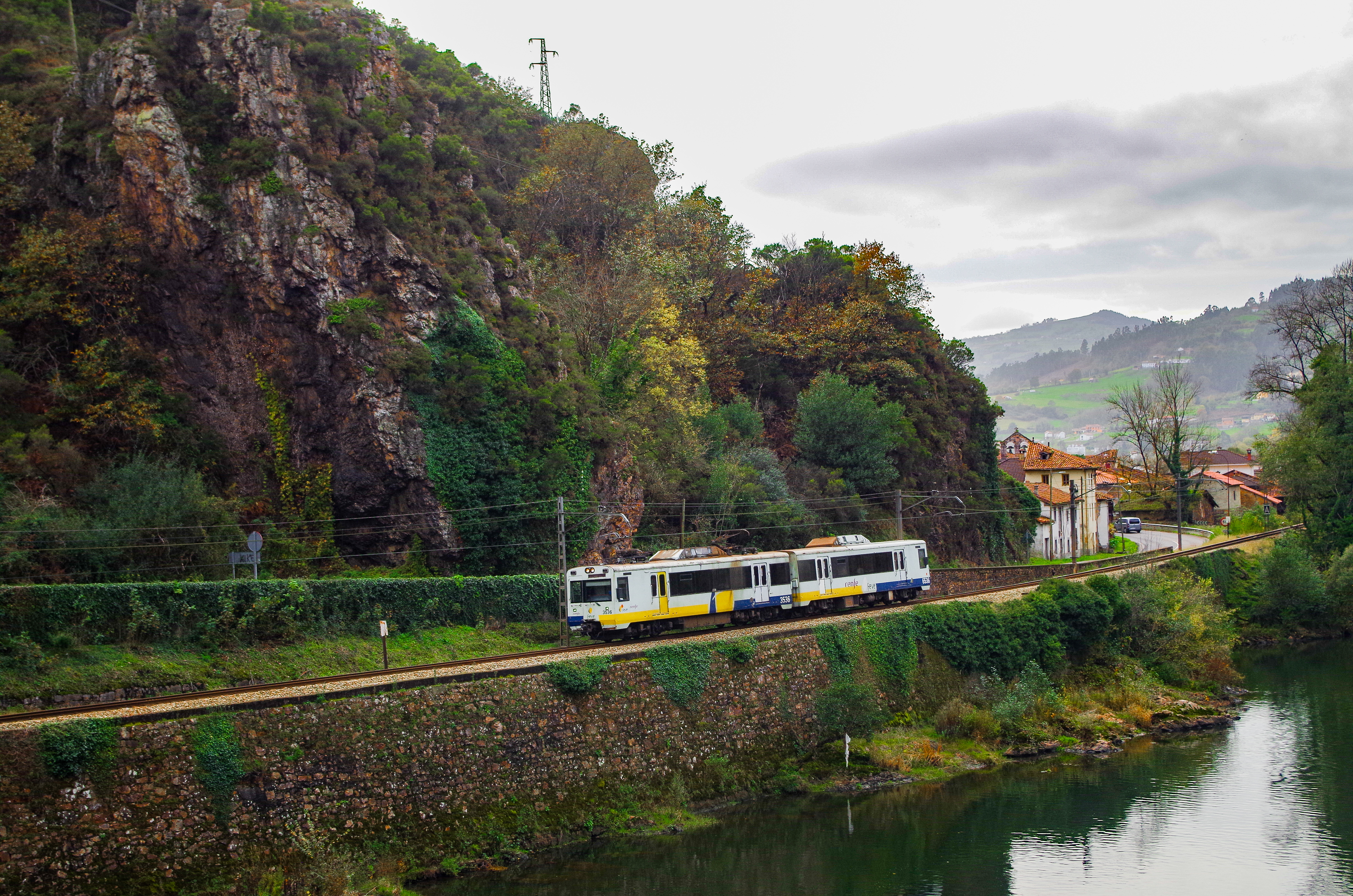
- A Renfe 3500 Series train on C-5 line going through the Nalón basin area.

Overview
- Service type: Commuter rail
- System: Cercanías Asturias
- Status: Operational
- Locale: Asturias, Spain
- Current operator: Renfe Operadora

Route
- Termini: Gijón; La Pola de Llaviana/Pola de Laviana
- Stops: 26
- Line used: Gijón−Laviana railway line

Technical
- Track gauge: 1,000 mm (3 ft 3 3/8 in) metre gauge
- Electrification: yes 1500kV AC overhead line
- Track owner: Adif

The C-5 line is a rail service of Cercanías Asturias commuter rail network, operated by Renfe Operadora. Its termini are Gijón and La Pola de Llaviana/Pola de Laviana stations.

== History ==
In 1842, a commission studied the possibility of building a railway to link the coal-mining areas along the Nalón basin to the port of Gijón. The Compañía de Ferrocarril de Langreo was founded in 1846, and the following year work began on the line, which was to be a standard gauge line. The first section of the line (Gijón-Pinzales) was opened in 1852 under the auspices of Maria Christina of the Two Sicilies, marking the first railway line to be built in Asturias. In 1856 the line was extended to Sama and in 1875 it reached its present terminus in Laviana.

In the latter half of the 20th century, railway freight transport lost its economic significance, and Ferrocarril de Langreo accumulated a considerable amount of debts. Consequently, in 1972, the ownership of this line was transferred to FEVE, a government-owned company established with the objective of operating all narrow-gauge railway lines within Spain. As this line was not originally built as a narrow-gauge line the transition from international-gauge was completed in 1984, so it could be integrated with the rest of the FEVE-operated lines.

Following the integration of Feve into Renfe Feve in 2012 (renamed as Renfe Cercanías AM in 2021), due to the lack of investment, infrastructure has been deteriorating and the poor conditions of the rolling stock have repeatedly caused service cancellations in the past. years. This unreliability has also caused a dramastic reduction in the number of daily passengers.

In 2011, the old el Humedal Station was demolished and the train service was reallocated to a provisional station until an intermodal station is built in the future.

== Future ==
According to the Plan de Cercanías, a number of works are anticipated to be carried out on the line in the future. These include the duplication of railway lines, the installation of new security and electric systems, and the replacement of existing sleepers. Besides, it is expected that the underground segment of the railway line traversing Langreo, along with the construction of two new stations in Sama and La Felguera, will be completed by 2025. There are also plans to introduce new semi-express services that will not stop at every station in order to provide a faster service.

== Rolling Stock ==
Current:

- 3300 Series (former FEVE 3300 Series)
- 3500 Series (former FEVE 3500 Series)
- 3600 Series (former FEVE 3600 Series)
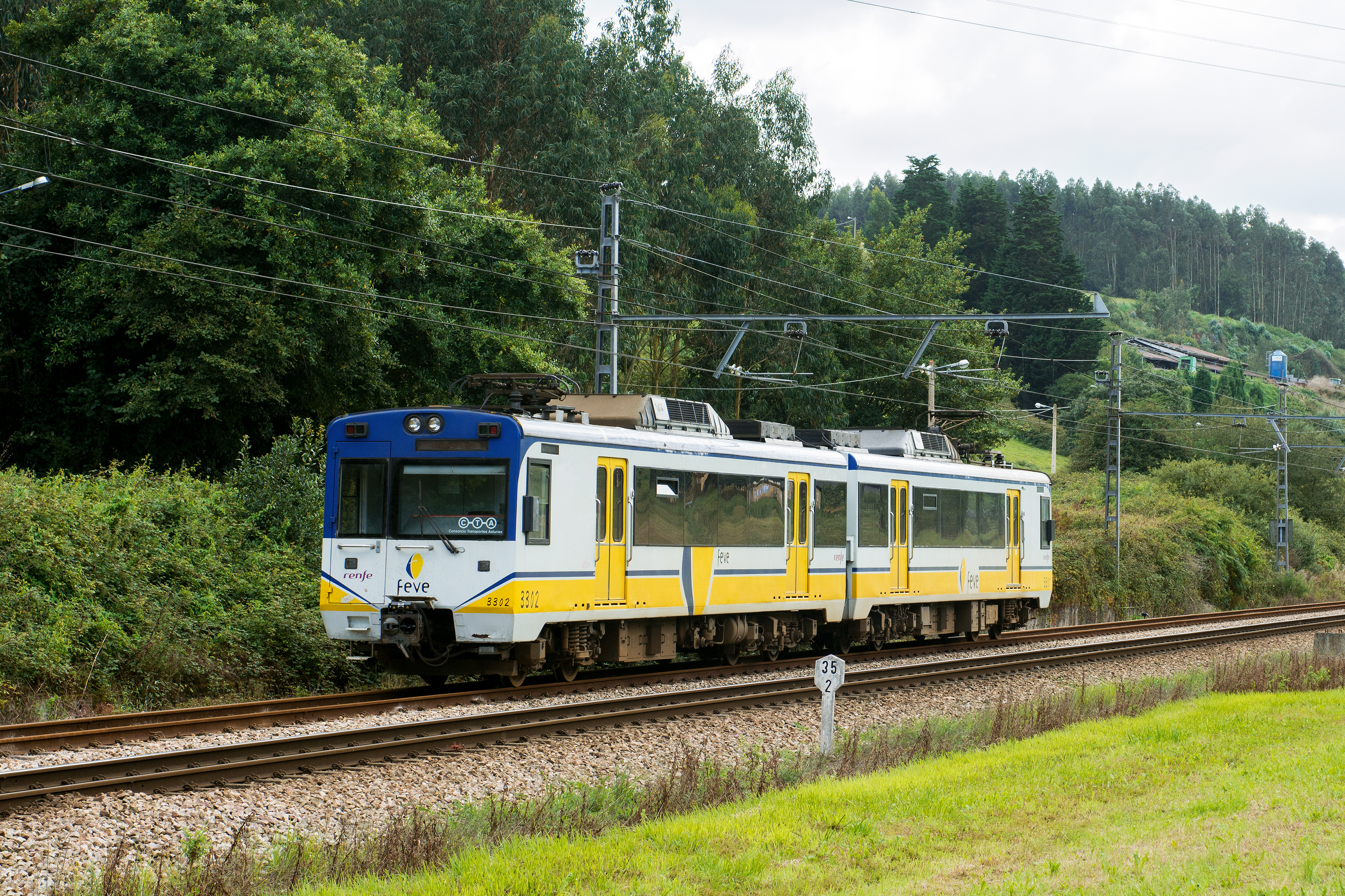
3300 Series

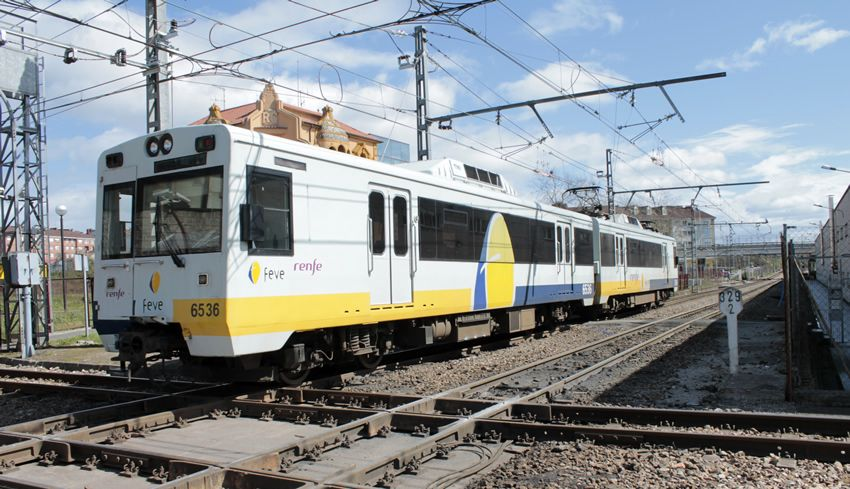
3500 Series

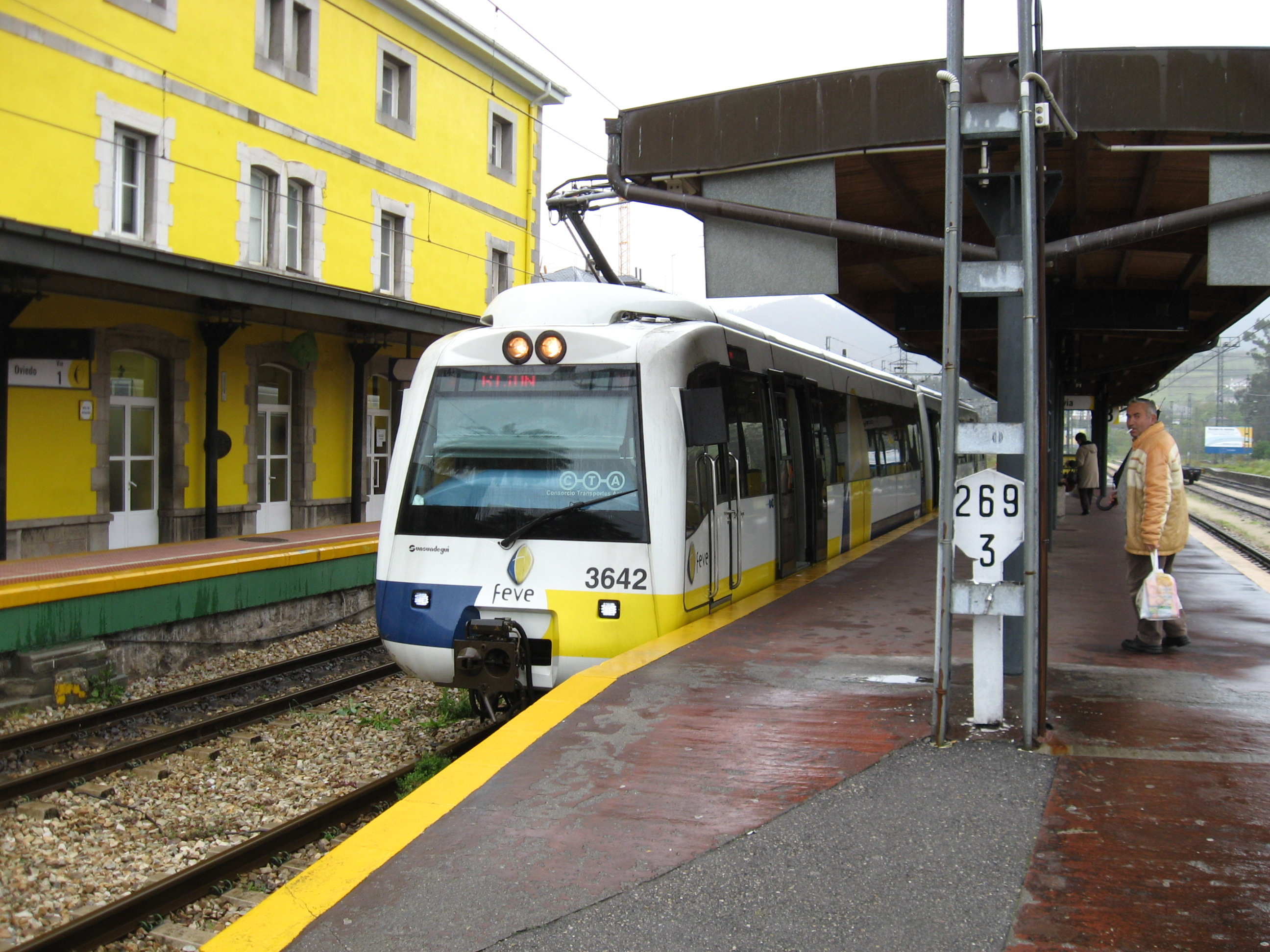
3600 Series

== Stations ==
Station	Transfers	Transfers (other services)	Location	Fare Zone
Gijón		Regional	Gijón	4D
Tremañes-Llangréu/Langreo			Gijón	4D
Sotiello			Gijón	4D
Pinzales			Gijón	4D
Aguda			Gijón	3/4D
Puente Buracos			Siero	3
La Florida			Siero	3
Noreña			Noreña	3/2
El Berrón			Siero	2
Xixún			Siero	2
Bendición			Siero	2
Valdesoto			Siero	2
Carbayín			Siero	2/3
Curuxona			Siero	3
Tuiya/Tuilla			Langreo	3
La Felguera-Vega			Langreo	3
Sama-Los Llerones			Langreo	3
Ciañu			Langreo	3
San Vicente			San Martín del Rey Aurelio	3
L'Entregu-La Escura			San Martín del Rey Aurelio	3/4
Carrocera			San Martín del Rey Aurelio	4
Samartín			San Martín del Rey Aurelio	4
Sotrondio			San Martín del Rey Aurelio	4
Blimea			San Martín del Rey Aurelio	4
Los Barreros/Barredos			Laviana	4
La Pola de Llaviana/Pola de Laviana			Laviana	4
