= C-7 (Cercanías Asturias) =

Spanish commuter rail service

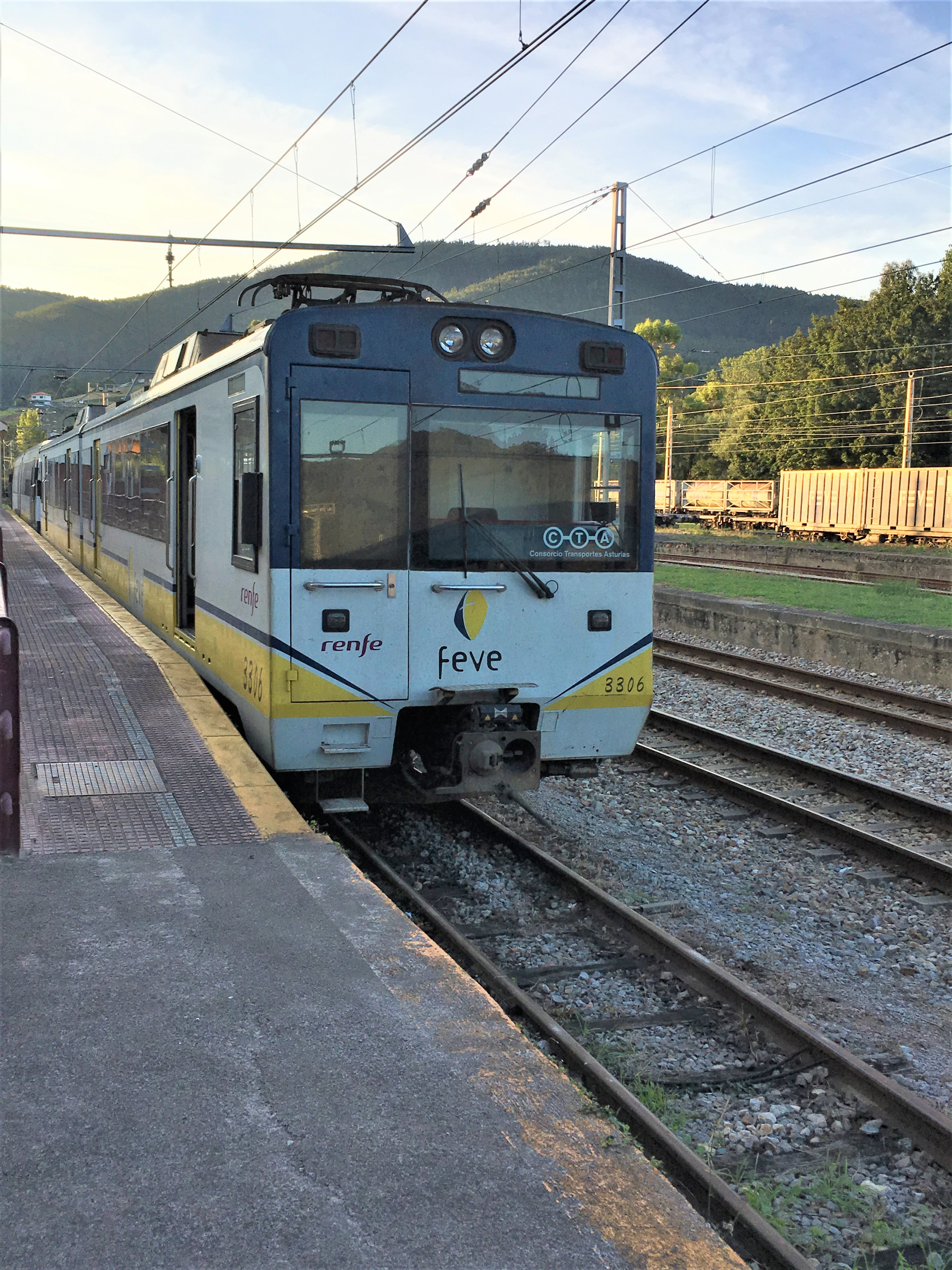
- A Renfe 3300 Series train on C-7 line at Pravia station in 2017.

Overview
- Service type: Commuter rail
- System: Cercanías Asturias
- Status: Operational
- Locale: Asturias, Spain
- Current operator: Renfe Operadora

Route
- Termini: Oviedo; San Esteban
- Stops: 21
- Distance travelled: 51.20 km (31.81 mi)
- Lines used: Oviedo−Trubia railway line San Esteban−Trubia railway line

Technical
- Track gauge: 1,000 mm (3 ft 3 3/8 in) metre gauge
- Electrification: yes 1500kV AC overhead line
- Track owner: Adif

The C-7 line is a rail service of Cercanías Asturias commuter rail network, operated by Renfe Operadora. Its termini are Oviedo and San Esteban stations.

== History ==
The defunct Sociedad General de Ferrocarriles Vasco Asturiana inaugurated this line as part of its Oviedo-San Esteban de Pravia line, which was opened in 1904. The railway was born with the goal of transporting coal to the port of San Esteban in Pravia.

In the latter half of the 20th century, railway freight transport lost its economic significance, and Ferrocarril de El Vasco accumulated a considerable amount of debts. Consequently, in 1972, the ownership of this line was transferred to FEVE, a government-owned company established with the objective of operating all narrow-gauge railway lines within Spain. After the acquisition by the government, freight transport was discontinued and the port of San Esteban was closed as a consequence.

In 1999, as part of a urbanistic project called the Green Belt, the Fuso de la Reina branch to Oviedo was closed and the former iberian-gauge C-3 line (Oviedo-Trubia railway line) was converted into narrow-gauge.

Following the integration of Feve into Renfe Feve in 2012 (renamed as Renfe Cercanías AM in 2021), due to the lack of investment, infrastructure has been deteriorating and the poor conditions of the rolling stock have repeatedly caused service cancellations in the past years. Consequently, the number of passengers has been dropping.

== Rolling Stock ==
Current:

- 3300 Series (former FEVE 3300 Series)
- 3600 Series (former FEVE 3600 Series)
- 3500 Series (former FEVE 3500 Series)
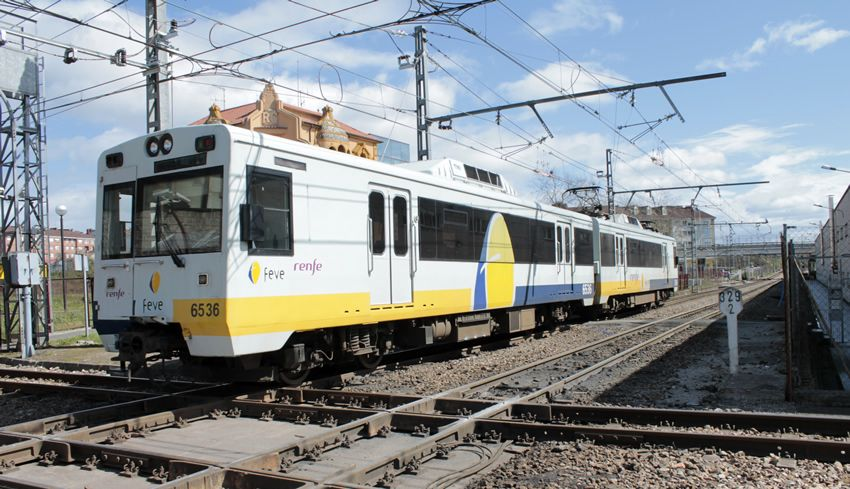
3500 Series

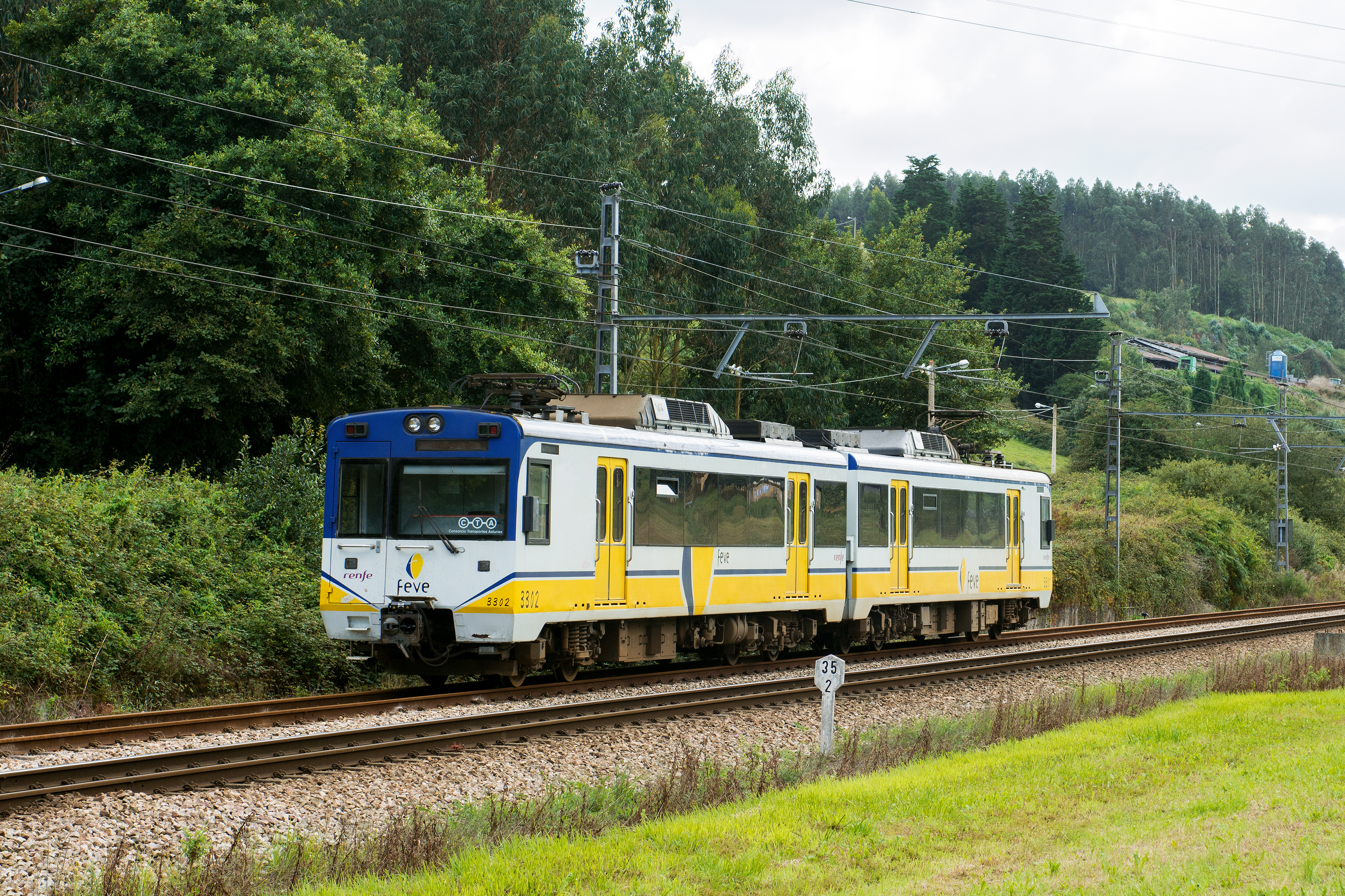
3300 Series

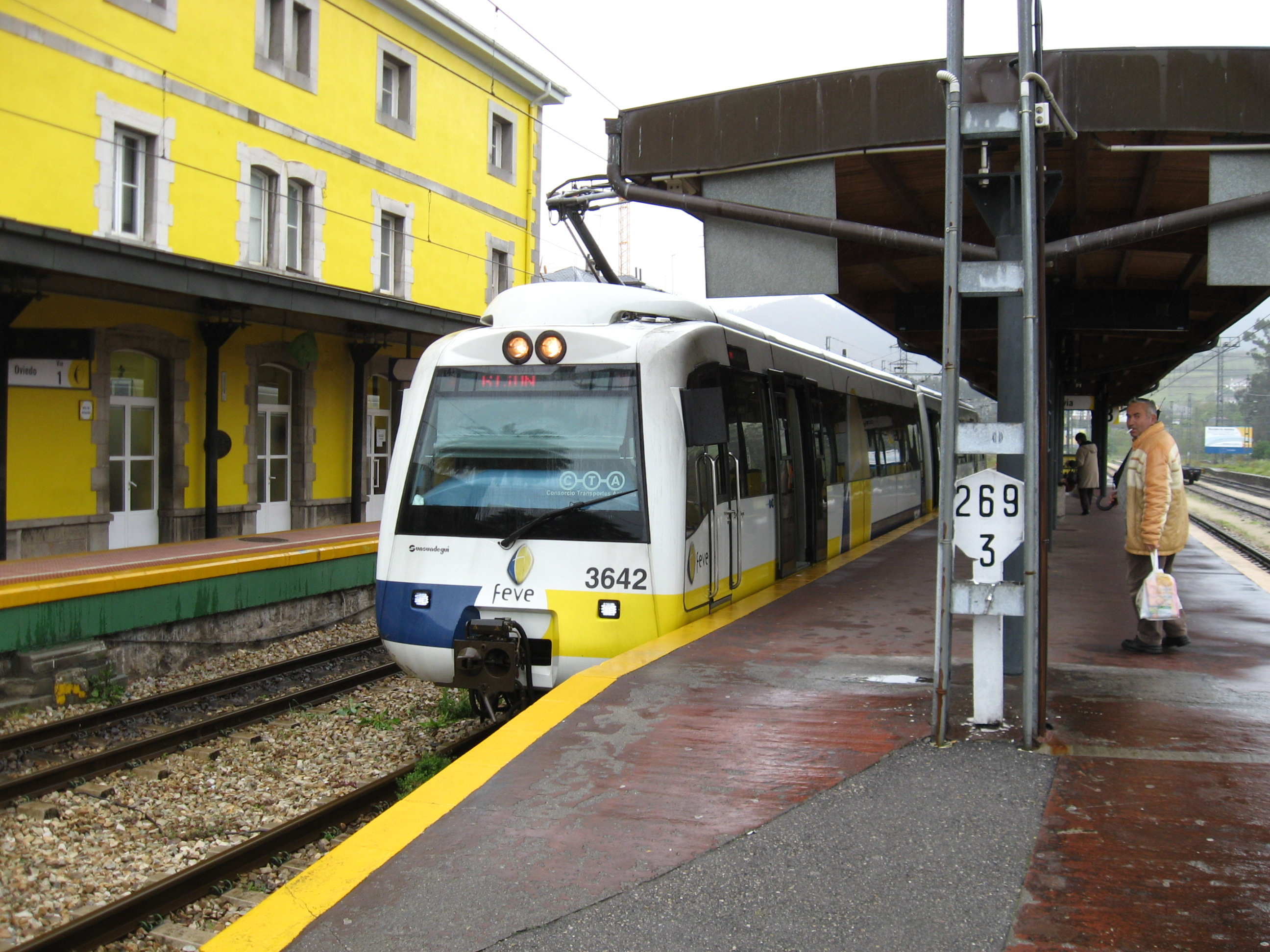
3600 Series

== Stations ==
Station	Transfers	Location	Fare Zone
San Esteban		Pravia	4A
San Ranón		Pravia	4A
Pravia		Pravia	4A
Beifar		Candamo	4A
San Román		Candamo	4A/3
Aces		Candamo	3
Sandiche		Candamo	3
Grau/Grado		Grado	3/2
Peñaflor		Grado	2
Veiga d'Anzu		Grado	2
Santa María Gradu		Grado	2
Trubia		Oviedo	2
Soto-Udrión		Oviedo	2/1
San Pedru Nora		Oviedo	1
San Claudio/San Cloyo		Oviedo	1
Les Maces		Oviedo	1
Les Campes		Oviedo	1
L'Argañosa-Llapiés		Oviedo	1
El Vallobín		Oviedo	1
Oviedo		Oviedo	1
