= C-2 (Cercanías Asturias) =

Spanish commuter rail service

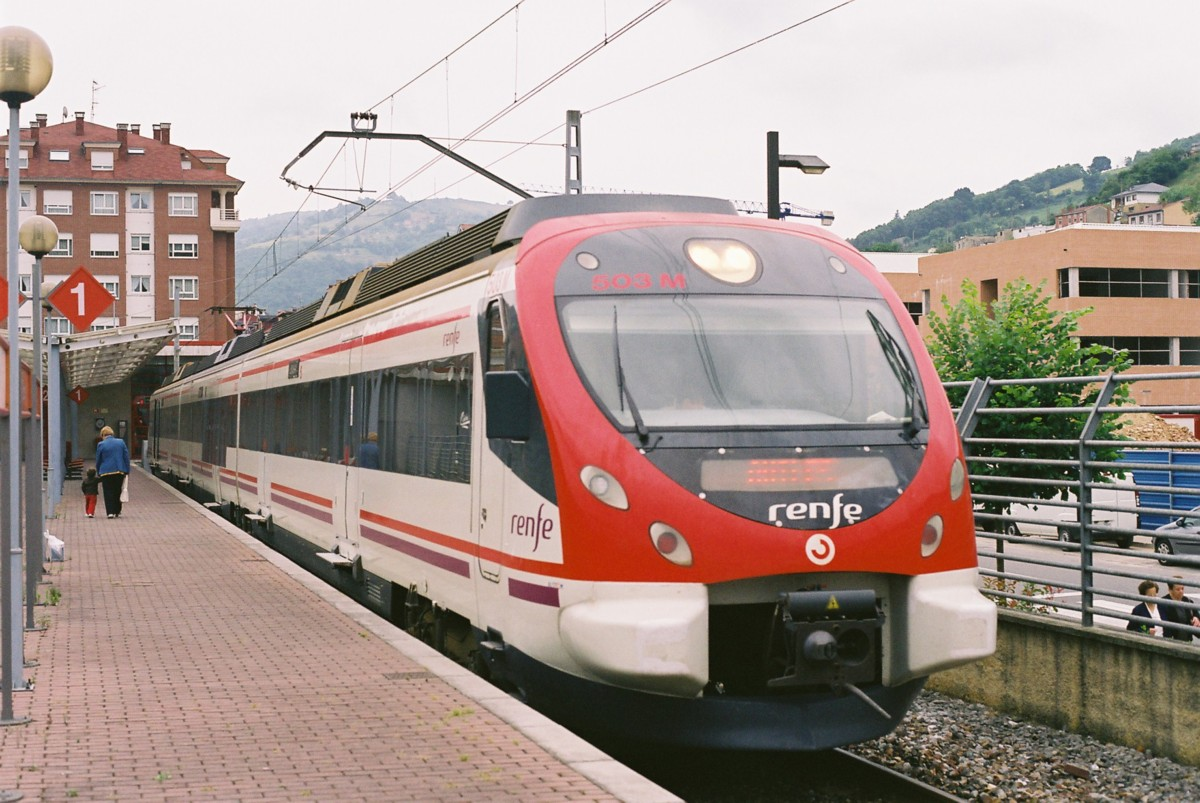
- A Civia train on C-2 line at El Entrego terminal station in 2007.

Overview
- Service type: Commuter rail
- System: Cercanías Asturias
- Status: Operational
- Locale: Asturias, Spain
- Current operator: Renfe Operadora

Route
- Termini: El Entrego; Oviedo
- Stops: 13
- Distance travelled: 23.6 km
- Line used: León-Gijón railway line Soto de Rey-El Entrego railway line

Technical
- Rolling stock: Civia EMUs
- Track gauge: 1,668 mm (5 ft 5 21/32 in) Iberian gauge
- Electrification: 3kV AC overhead line
- Track owner: Adif

The C-2 line is a rail service of Cercanías Asturias commuter rail network, operated by Renfe Operadora. Its termini are El Entrego and Oviedo stations.

== History ==
This line was opened in 1894 by the Compañía de los Caminos de Hierro del Norte de España as a branch of the main Gijón-León line. It was built to transport coal from the Nalón basin, and several steel mills benefited from this line, as they used it to obtain their raw materials and to export their products. Duro Felguera would link their mines to this line.

In 1936, during the Spanish Civil War, the company suffered serious economic damage. After the war, many employees had been purged by the new authorities and the company's financial situation was extremely poor and in 1941 the new Francoist regime nationalised all the Iberian gauge railways in Spain and incorporated them into the newly formed Renfe.

In the following decades this line was used for freight and passengers transportation and its services were commonly known as "Cercanías", but it was perceived as unreliable, so Renfe began plans to create a defined and organised service. However, it was not until 1989 that this name became official, when Renfe created a division responsible for planning and organising these services.

== Rolling Stock ==
Nowadays all services are operated by Civia models

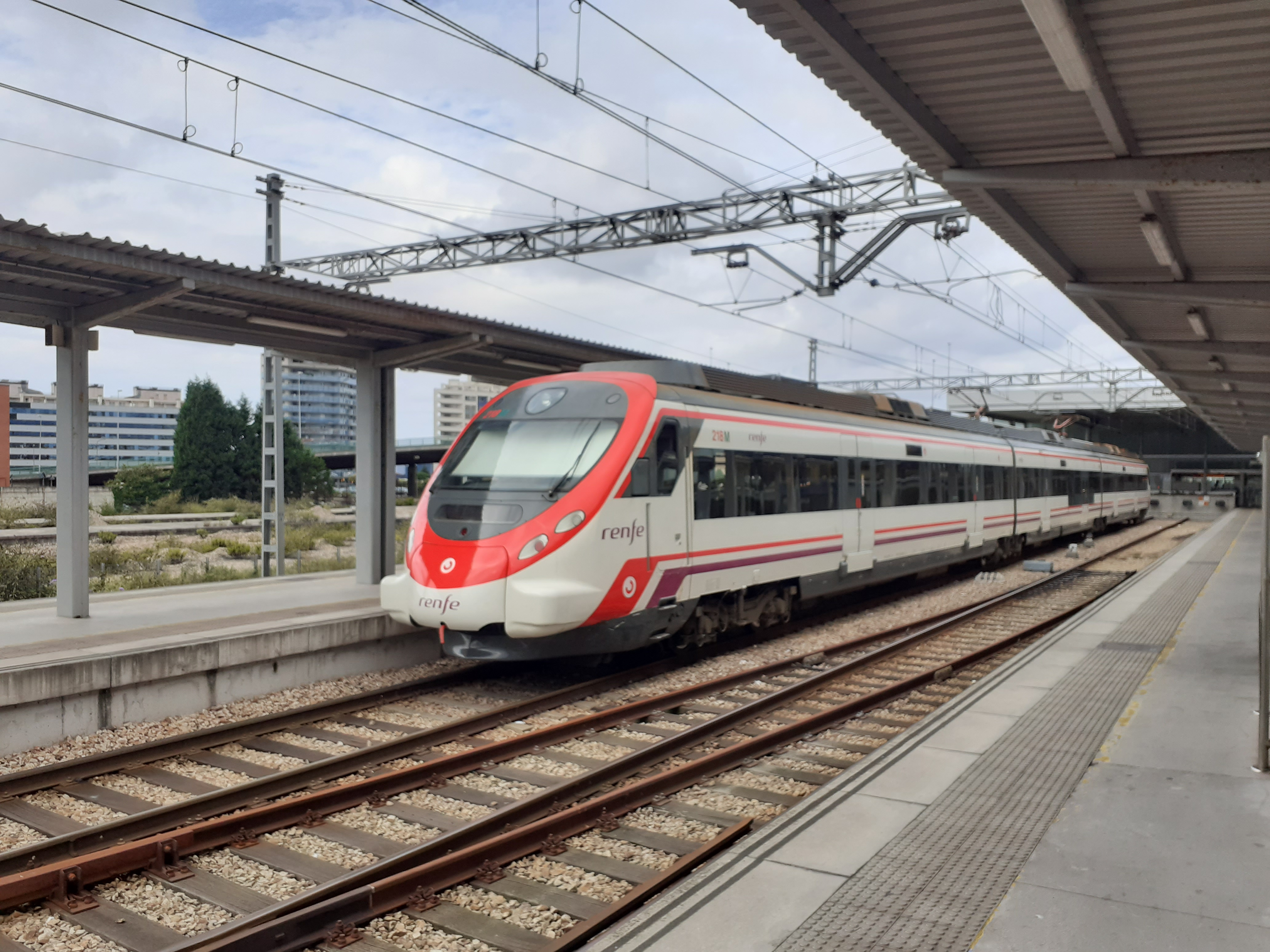

== Stations ==
Station	Transfers (Cercanías)	Transfers (Other services)	Location	Fare Zone
Oviedo	C-1 (Cercanías Asturias) C-3 (Cercanías Asturias) C-5a (Cercanías Asturias) C-6 (Cercanías Asturias) C-7 (Cercanías Asturias)	Regional	Oviedo	1
Llamaquique	C-1 (Cercanías Asturias) C-3 (Cercanías Asturias)	Regional	Oviedo	1
El Caleyo	C-1 (Cercanías Asturias)		Oviedo	1/2
Las Segadas	C-1 (Cercanías Asturias)		Oviedo	2
Soto de Rey	C-1 (Cercanías Asturias)		Ribera de Arriba	2
Santa Eulalia de Manzaneda			Oviedo	2/3
Tudela-Veguín			Oviedo	3
Peña Rubia			Langreo	3
Barrios			Langreo	3
La Felguera			Langreo	3
Sama			Langreo	3/4-B
Ciaño			Langreo	4-B
El Entrego			Langreo	4-B
