= Gijón railway station =

Main railway station of Gijón, Spain

Gijón
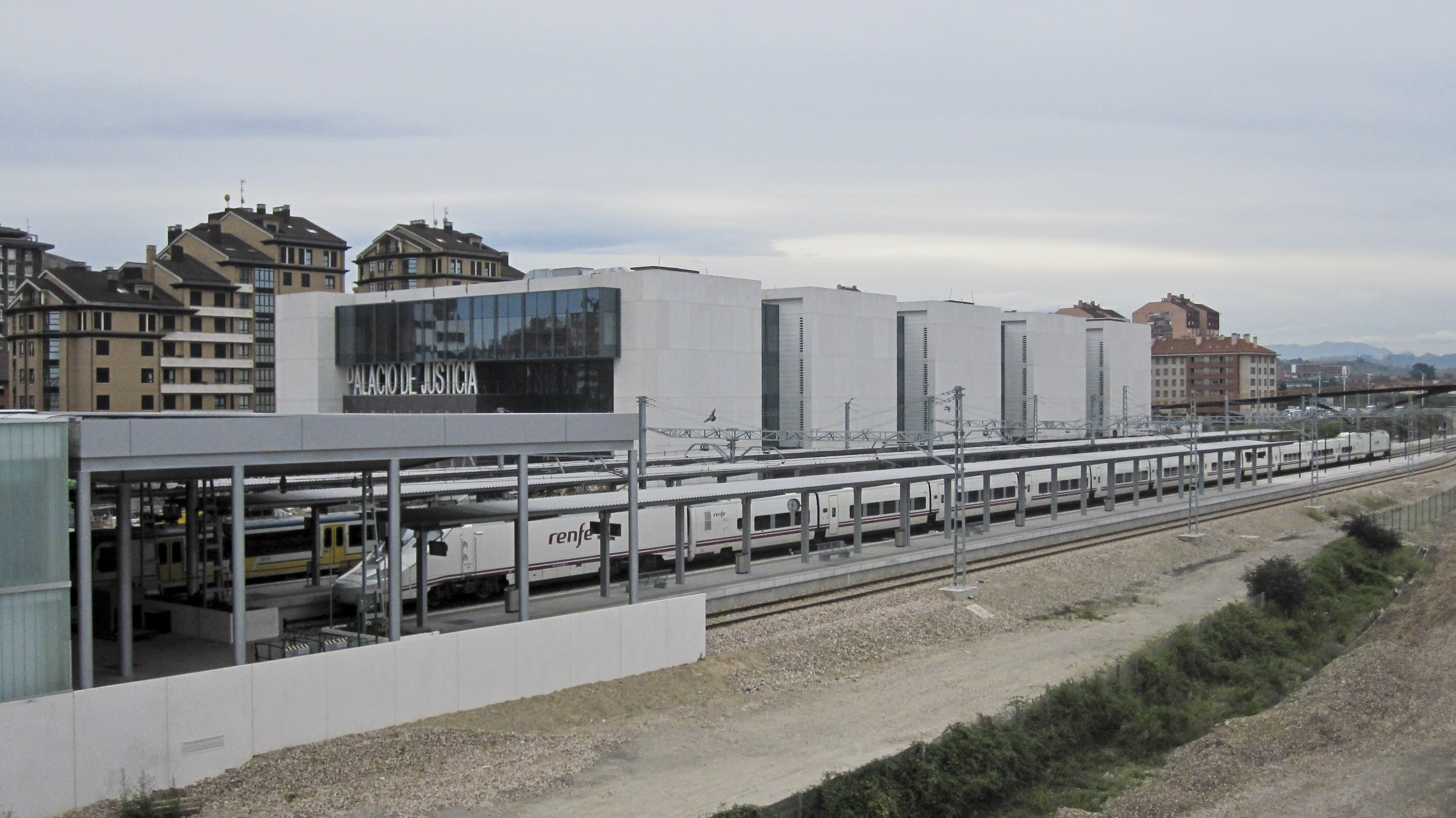
- Provisional Gijón Railway Station

General information
- Coordinates: 43°32′16″N 5°40′31″W
- Owner: adif
- Lines: Venta de Baños−Gijón (PK 304.9); Ferrol−Gijón (PK 321.4); Gijón−Pola de Laviana (PK 0.0)
- Platforms: 3
- Tracks: 6

Other information
- Station code: 15410

History
- Opened: 28 March 2011

Passengers
- 2018: 1,680,525 ( )
Location

Gijón Railway Station, also known as Gijón Sanz Crespo, is the main railway station of Gijón, Spain. Since 2011 it is located in Sanz Crespo street due to the works for the Metrotrén Asturias project. It is the terminus for Alvia services from Madrid, Alicante, León, Valladolid and Barcelona, as well as Intercity and Media Distancia services from Madrid, Valladolid and León. It is also the last destination for four Cercanías commuter railway lines.

The station was built in 2009 in order to find an alternative for Gijón-Jovellanos / La Braña and Gijón-Cercanías that were planned to be demolished in order to free up the area for the construction of the Metrotrén, a project to extend the train line underground. As of 2021, Gijón Sanz Crespo remains as the only station serving Gijón downtown, and even though the tunnels have been dug, there is no clear plan on where the new station will be built or even if it will be built at all.

== Infrastructure ==
The station consists of 3 platforms and 6 tracks, of which half are Iberian gauge and the other half are metre gauge. Trains travelling on different gauges have different tickets, trains and controls. Metre-gauge railways were formally operated by Ferrocarriles de Vía Estrecha (FEVE), which was later absorbed by Renfe, that at the time ran trains on Iberian and international gauge. However, Renfe kept former FEVE services in a separated division called Renfe Feve, and until 2023, fares, tickets and ticket barriers are different from the rest of Renfe trains (note that, as of 2026, barriers are still there, but they don't charge your card). Therefore, at the Gijón station it is necessary to separate the tracks on the south side - of metric gauge - from the tracks on the north side - of Iberian gauge -. This situation causes the middle platform to be divided by the east–west axis.

The station has information and tickets desks (again separated between gauges) and a small cafeteria. A car-renting company also operates in the station. Urban buses from EMTUSA, Gijón public transport company, stop in front of the station.

Preceding station	Renfe Operadora	Following station
Oviedo towards Madrid Chamartín	Alvia	Terminus
Oviedo towards Alicante	Alvia	Terminus
Oviedo towards Barcelona Sants	Alvia	Terminus
Oviedo towards Cádiz	Alvia	Terminus
Oviedo towards Oropesa del Mar	Alvia	Terminus
Oviedo towards Madrid Chamartín	Intercity	Terminus
Calzada de Asturias towards León	Media Distancia 24	Terminus
Preceding station	Cercanías Asturias	Following station
Calzada de Asturias towards Puente de los Fierros	C-1 (Cercanías Asturias)	Terminus
Tremañes towards Cudillero	C-4 (Cercanías Asturias)	Terminus
Tremañes towards La Pola de Llaviana/Pola de Laviana	C-5 (Cercanías Asturias)	Terminus
