= Asturias (disambiguation) =

Asturias is an autonomous community of Spain.

Asturias may also refer to:

== Places ==
- Kingdom of Asturias, established in the early 8th century by King Pelagius of Asturias
- Asturias, Cebu, a municipality in the Philippines
- Parque Asturias, a defunct stadium in Mexico City

== Ships ==
- RMS Asturias, a Royal Mail Steam Packet Company passenger liner launched in 1907 and scrapped in 1933
- RMS Asturias, a Royal Mail Steam Packet Company passenger liner launched in 1925 and scrapped in 1957
- Spanish frigate Asturias, launched in 1972 and decommissioned in 2009
- Spanish aircraft carrier Príncipe de Asturias, launched in 1982 and decommissioned in 2013

== Culture and sports ==
- Asturias autonomous football team, a regional football team for Asturias in Spain
- Asturias (sculpture), a work of art outside Oviedo railway station
- Asturias F.C., a former Mexican football team
- Duchy of Asturia, a fictional duchy from David Eddings' Belgariad and related works
- Asturias (Leyenda), a musical work by the Spanish composer and pianist Isaac Albéniz

== Other uses ==
- Asturias (surname)
- Asturias Forum, a political party in Spain
