= Metrotrén Asturias =

Overview
- Status: Part constructed, abandoned
- Locale: Asturias, Spain
- Termini: Gijón railway station; Cabueñes
- Stations: 6

Service
- Type: Commuter rail
- System: Cercanías Asturias

Technical
- Line length: 6.3 km (3.9 mi)
- Track gauge: 1,668 mm (5 ft 5 21/32 in) Iberian gauge

Metrotrén Asturias is a project to enhance the Cercanías Asturias commuter rail in Spanish autonomous community of Asturias, primarily by way of an underground tunnel through the city of Gijón.

== History ==
The project for the renovation of the suburban railway network of Asturias was presented in August 2000 by the Ministry of Development. It consisted mainly in the creation of a new tunnel of 3,858 meters in length in Gijón between the Humedal station and the roundabout of Viesques, which included three new stations: Begoña, El Bibio and Viesques. The construction of this tunnel began on June 10, 2003 and ended in December 2006, although only the El Bibio station and a technical station were built on Avenida Justo del Castillo.

The project, by increasing the density of rail transport in Gijón and being buried, was known as the "Gijón metro".

During the construction of the tunnel, the Ministry of Development changed its criteria regarding the rest of the project's actions, deciding that it be extended to reach the Cabueñes area, thus doubling the length of the section. In addition, the construction of two new stations, an interchange, and the replacement of the planned Begoña station by another in the Plaza de Europa were included.

This second phase remained paralyzed from the end of the previous phase, with the tunnel remaining unused for the whole time. The complete definition of the second phase ended in 2009, with the remaining cost estimated at €360 million, with an action along 7 km between the Humedal and Cabueñes. The development of this second part began in 2011 through public-private financing, and involves the provisional diversion of the FEVE lines from the Humedal station to the provisional station of Sanz Crespo, which was started in February 2011. This section will have dual-gauge tracks to be used by both Ibergian-gauge and metre-gauge trains.

The project also consists of improvements at other railway stations in Asturias, such as those located in Avilés.

== Current situation ==
In 2017, it was announced that work on the Metrotrén tunnel is due to resume in 2019 and conclude in 2023.

In 2020, the Spanish government railway infrastructure manager Administrador de Infraestructuras Ferroviarias (Adif) confirmed that the previous plan for metre-gauge lines to share the tunnel with mainline Iberian-gauge lines would be dropped, with only the Iberian-gauge Gijón to León line via Oviedo using the tunnel.
