= C-1 (Cercanías Asturias) =

Spanish commuter rail service

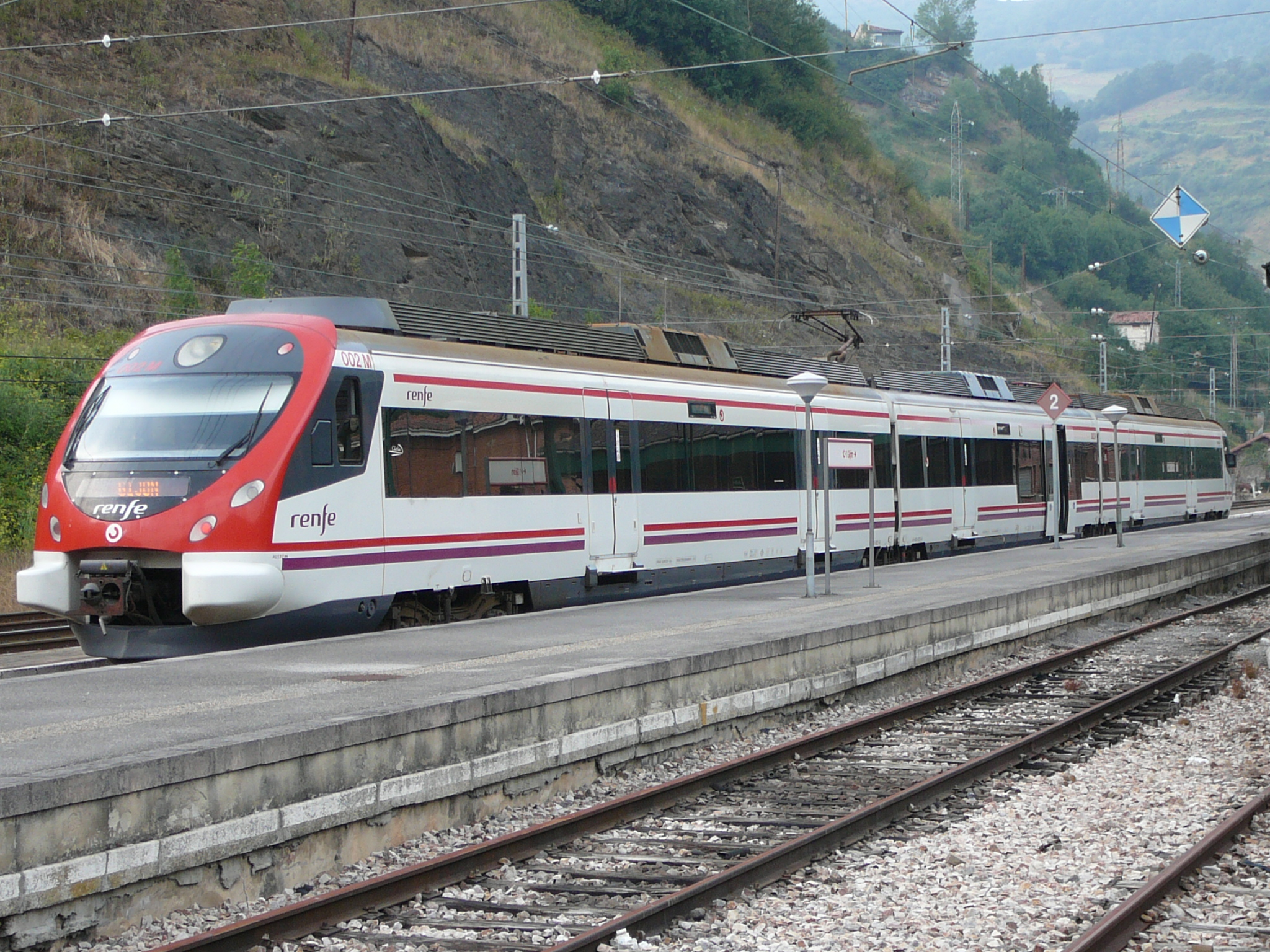
- A Civia train on a C-1 at Puente de los Fierros terminal station in 2012.

Overview
- Service type: Commuter rail
- System: Cercanías Asturias
- Status: Operational
- Locale: Asturias, Spain
- Current operator: Renfe Operadora

Route
- Termini: Puente de los Fierros; Gijón
- Stops: 27
- Distance travelled: 23.6 km
- Line used: León-Gijón railway line

Technical
- Rolling stock: Civia EMUs
- Track gauge: 1,668 mm (5 ft 5 21/32 in) Iberian gauge
- Electrification: 3kV AC overhead line
- Track owner: Adif

The C-1 line is a rail service of Cercanías Asturias commuter rail network, operated by Renfe Operadora, connecting the most populated urban areas in Asturias. Its termini are Gijón and Puente de los Fierros stations.

== History ==
In the 19th century, the government and local companies wanted to build a railway to link Asturias with the rest of the country, so that Castile's agricultural products could be exported via the port of Gijón and Asturian coal could be easily transported to the rest of the country. After decades of planning, construction began in 1864 by the Compañía de Ferrocarril del Noroeste de España, which went bankrupt in 1878. At that time, the sections between Leon and Busdongo and between Pola de Lena and Gijón had already been built. These sections were connected in 1884, after the Compañía de los Ferrocarriles de Asturias, Galicia y León had completed the Rampa de Pajares, which crosses the Pajares Pass, a sinuous mountain pass in the Cantabrian Mountains at 1,379 metres. In 1885, the Compañía de los Caminos de Hierro del Norte de España, popularly known as Norte, took control of this line.

In the decades that followed, Norte opened several sections that split off from the main line in Asturias. In 1924, the segment between Gijón and Uxo was electrified at 3kV AC in order to increase the amount of coal that the company's trains could transport. In 1936, during the Spanish Civil War, the company suffered serious economic damage. After the war, the company's financial situation was extremely poor and in 1941 the new Francoist regime nationalised all the Iberian gauge railways in Spain and incorporated them into the newly formed Renfe.

In the following decades this line was used for freight and passengers transportation and its services were commonly known as "Cercanías", but it was perceived as unreliable, so Renfe began plans to create a defined and organised service. However, it was not until 1989 that this name became official, when Renfe created a division responsible for planning and organising these services.

== Future ==
An extension of this line is expected in the future, which would start at Gijón station and cross Gijón underground to reach the Cabueñes Hospital in the easternmost part of the city. Construction began in 2003 and the main tunnels of this extension were completed in 2006. The old Feve and Renfe stations were closed and replaced by a temporary Gijón station in 2011. After a decade of no new progress on this project, a plan assessing the impact of building new tunnels under the city was published in 2024, and it is expected that a construction project and the details on the tendering process will soon be published.

== Rolling Stock ==
Nowadays all services are operated by Civia models

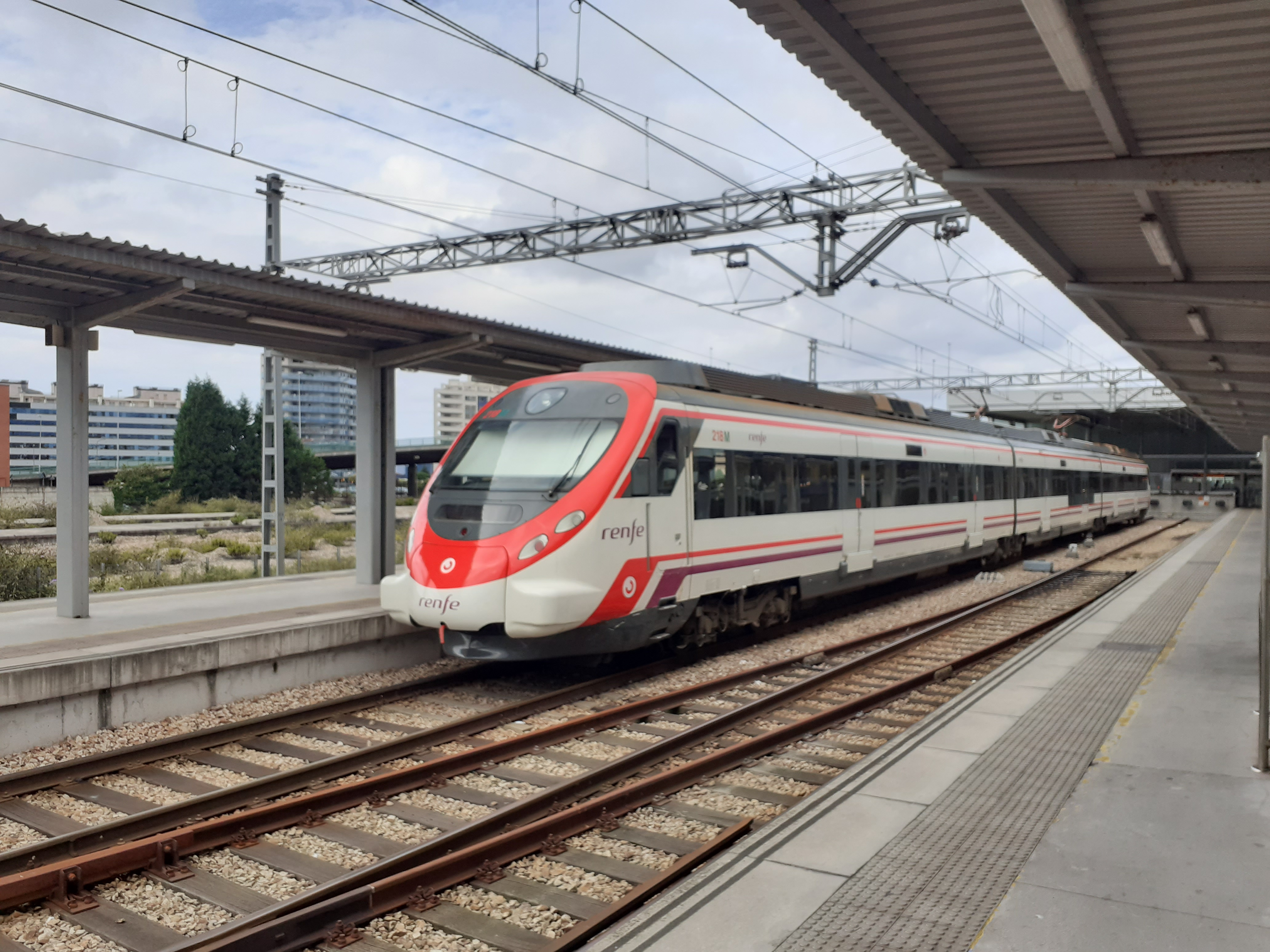

== Stations ==
Legend:

CIVIS (express train service) :

●: Stops, ｜: Does not stop *Only the first service in the morning

Station	CIVIS	Transfers (Cercanías)	Transfers (Other services)	Location	Fare Zone
Gijón/Xixón	●		Regional	Gijón	4D
La Calzada	●		Regional	Gijón	4D
Veriña	｜			Gijón	3/4D
Montiana	｜			Gijón	3
Serín	｜			Gijón	3
Tabladiello	｜			Llanera	2/3
Villabona	｜			Llanera	2
Lugo de Llanera	●*			Llanera	2
Lugones/Llugones	●*			Siero	1/2
La Corredoria	●*			Oviedo	1
Oviedo/Uviéu	●		Regional	Oviedo	1
Llamaquique	●		Regional	Oviedo	1
El Caleyu	｜			Oviedo	1
Les Segaes/Las Segadas	｜			Ribera de Arriba	1
Soto Rei/Soto del Rey	｜			Ribera de Arriba	1/2
Olloniego/Lluniego	｜			Oviedo	2
La Perea	｜			Mieres	2
Ablaña	｜			Mieres	2
Mieres-Puente	｜		Regional	Mieres	2/3
Santuyano	｜			Mieres	3
Uxo	｜		Regional	Mieres	3
Viḷḷayana	｜			Lena	3
La Pola	｜		Regional	Lena	4
La Cobertoria	｜			Lena	4
Campumanes	｜		Regional	Lena	4
La Frecha	｜			Lena	4
Fierros	｜		Regional	Lena	4
