= Oviedo railway station =

Railway station in Oviedo, Spain

Coordinates: 43.3661°N 5.8547°W

Oviedo
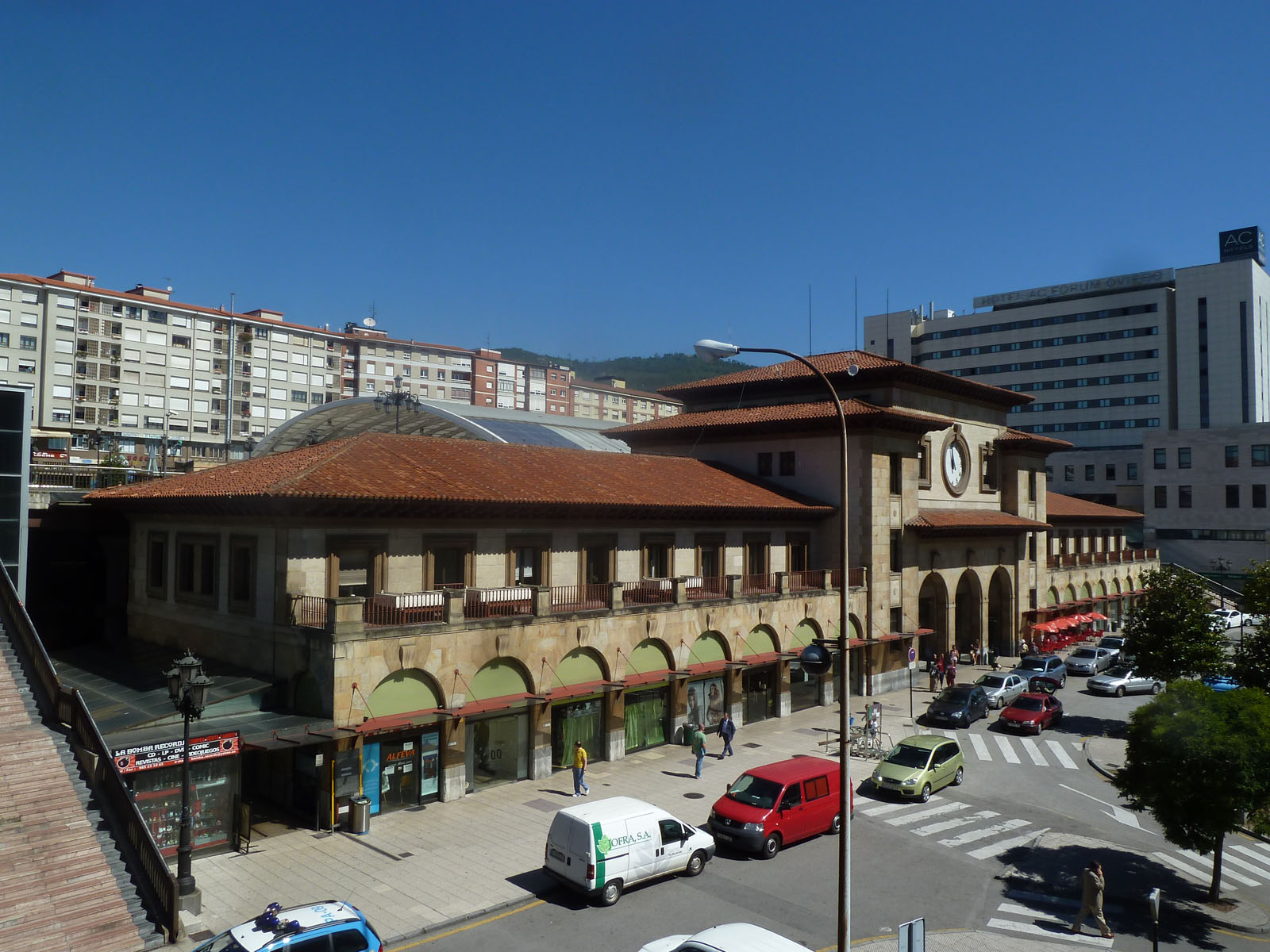
- Station in 2012

General information
- Owner: Adif
- Operator: Renfe
- Lines: Adif: Venta de Baños–Gijón; Trubia–Santander

History
- Opened: 1874

Passengers
- 2018: 3,518,558 ( )
Location

Oviedo railway station (Spanish: Estación de Oviedo or Estación del Norte) is the main station in the Spanish city of Oviedo, capital of the province of Asturias. It opened in 1874 and was reconstructed after the Spanish Civil War.

The station provides a wide range of long- and middle-distance services, in addition to regional and suburban (cercanías) services operated by Renfe. These services connect Oviedo with the other main centres of Asturias and the remainder of the Cantabrian Sea coast, and with other parts of Spain including the inland plateau, the Levante and Catalonia.

The station is located at the end of calle de Uría, a main commercial thoroughfare. It is adjacent to the bus station (Estación de Autobuses de Oviedo), built in 2003.

== Location on the rail network ==
A number of railway lines start from or pass through the station, carrying long- and medium-distance, regional and suburban services. It is on the broad-gauge Venta de Baños–Gijón railway, providing a connection to the Madrid–Hendaye railway route. The "radial configuration" of regional services in Asturias has Oviedo station as its centre. It is also the starting point of the narrow-gauge line to Trubia, and it is on the line between Ferrol and Aranguren.

== History ==
The station was opened on 23 July 1874, upon the opening of the Gijón-Pola de Lena stretch of the line between Gijón and León which aimed to link Asturias with the inland plateau. The works were commissioned by the Railway Company of Asturias, Galicia y León (Compañía de los Ferrocarriles de Asturias, Galicia y León).

The station was planned to handle both passengers and freight. In 1883 it was enlarged with the opening of the line to Trubia, built mainly to carry coal which was brought there by a mining railway from the mines of Quirós, Teverga and Proaza, and also to serve the armaments factory (Fábrica de Cañones) at Trubia. In 1885 the original Railway Company failed, and the station passed with its other property to the Railway Company of Northern Spain (Compañía de los Caminos de Hierro del Norte de España). This company in turn was absorbed into the state-owned RENFE undertaking in 1941. The station was damaged in the Spanish Civil War and its reconstruction was planned by the architect Agustín Ballesteros. The station was re-opened by José María Fernández Ladreda on 14 October 1946.

In 1998 an overhead pedestrian area was constructed above the station. Then in 1999 the FEVE services were transferred into the station upon the closure of its two other stations in the city, Jovellanos and Económicos. In 2013 the FEVE company was amalgamated with Renfe, which became the sole operator of services using the station, while Adif became responsible for all the railway plant, both broad-gauge and narrow-gauge lines.

== The station ==
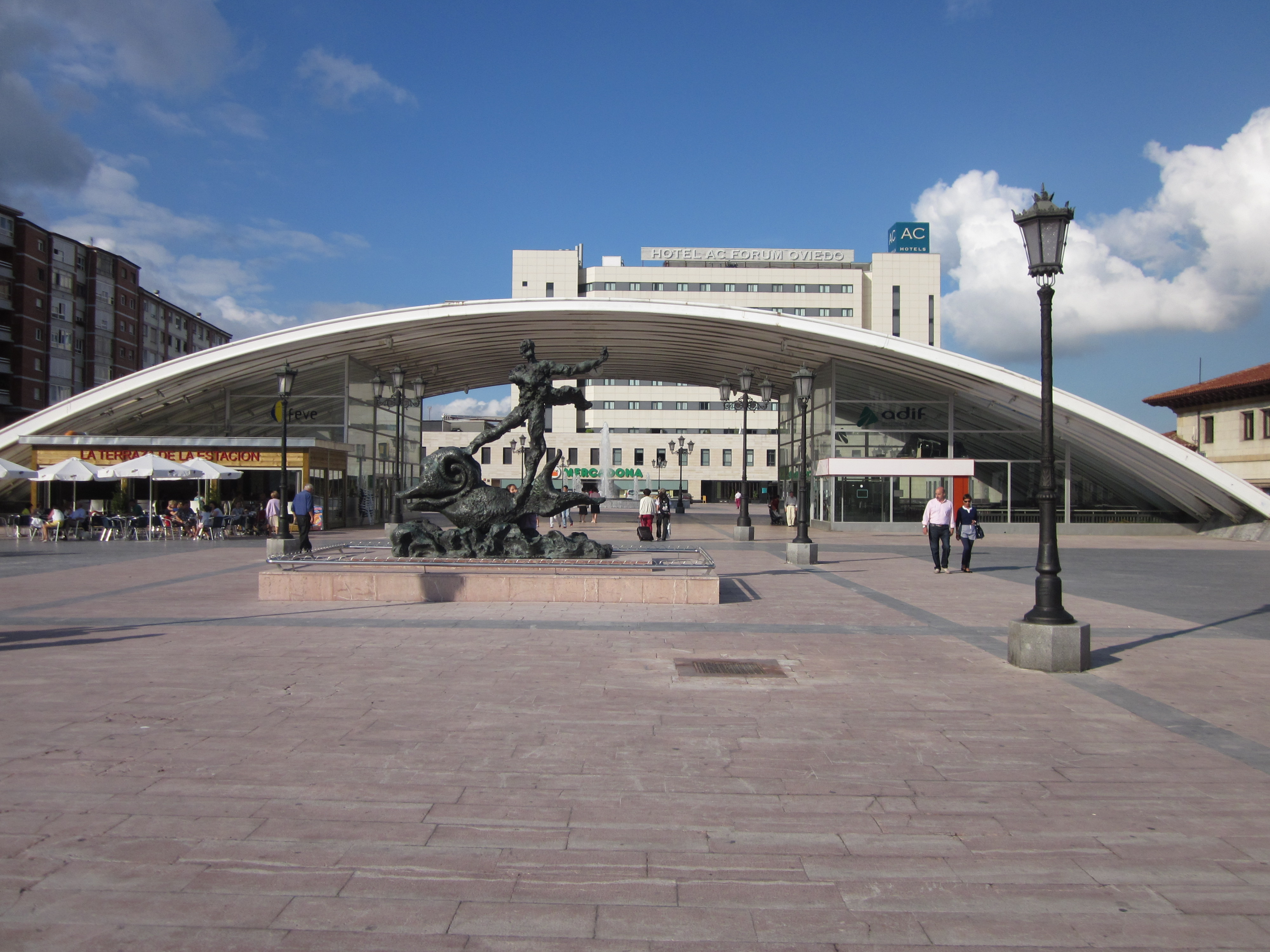
Entrance from the Fundación Príncipe de Asturias (or La Losa de Renfe) pedestrian precinct.

The main facade is at the end of calle de Uría. Its main features are those of the 1946 design. The two-level central canopy lies between two towers and is prolonged on both sides by two lateral wings. At ground level is a long portico made up of semicircular arches, all of the same size except for the three central arches which are somewhat larger and provide the main access to the enclosure. Despite the frontage's sober and functional appearance, the large centrally placed clock attracts the viewer's attention.

While the main passenger terminal has not undergone major changes since the 1946 reconstruction, the platform area and the incoming railway tracks have since then been covered over by the imposing paved precinct, designed by Leonardo Fernández Troyano, which rests on 220 columns. This covers an area of around 38,000 sq.m. and is about 700m across. It provides access to the station itself. The large plaza, known as Plaza de los Ferroviarios, is decorated with fountains and a variety of sculptures: Paz and Libertad ("Peace" and "Liberty"), by Luis Sanguino, and Hombre sobre delfín ("Man on a Dolphin"), by Salvador Dalí. Facing the old building is another sculpture, Asturias, by es:José Noja.

There are four platforms serving 13 tracks. The main platform, adjacent to the terminal area, gives access to track 2 which passes through, and to tracks 4, 6 and 8 via bay platforms to the sides. Across a bridge is the central platform, giving access to tracks 1 and 5. All these are broad-gauge tracks, of which there are three more without platform access. A further four tracks are reached from another central platform and a side platform.

Facilities provided at the station include a foyer, ticket office and machines, information points, business premises, cafetería and restaurant, kiosk, car hire, luggage store and toilets. Designated parking places are located outside the station.

== Rail services ==
=== Long-distance ===
The major long-distance rail connection is provided by the Alvia trains on the Gijón-Madrid route. These run several times each day and connect Oviedo with Gijón and Madrid-Chamartín, calling at León or Valladolid-Campo Grande. Other cities reachable direct by train from Oviedo include Albacete-Los Llanos, Alicante, Cádiz, Córdoba, Seville-Santa Justa, Valencia-Nord, Zaragoza–Delicias and Barcelona Sants.

Preceding station	Renfe Operadora	Following station
Mieres-Puente towards Madrid Chamartín	Alvia	Gijón Terminus
Mieres-Puente towards Alicante	Alvia	Gijón Terminus
Mieres-Puente towards Barcelona Sants	Alvia	Gijón Terminus
Mieres-Puente towards Oropesa del Mar	Alvia	Gijón Terminus

=== Medium distance ===
Renfe medium distance services connect this station with León, Ferrol, Gijón and Santander, with one León train continuing to Valladolid. During the summer months frequency is often increased by "beach trains" (trenes playeros).

Preceding station	Renfe Operadora	Following station
Terminus Terminus	Media Distancia R-2	La Corredoria towards Santander
Llamaquique towards Valladolid-Campo Grande	Media Distancia 24	La Corredoria towards Gijón
Llamaquique towards Ferrol	Media Distancia R-1	Terminus Terminus

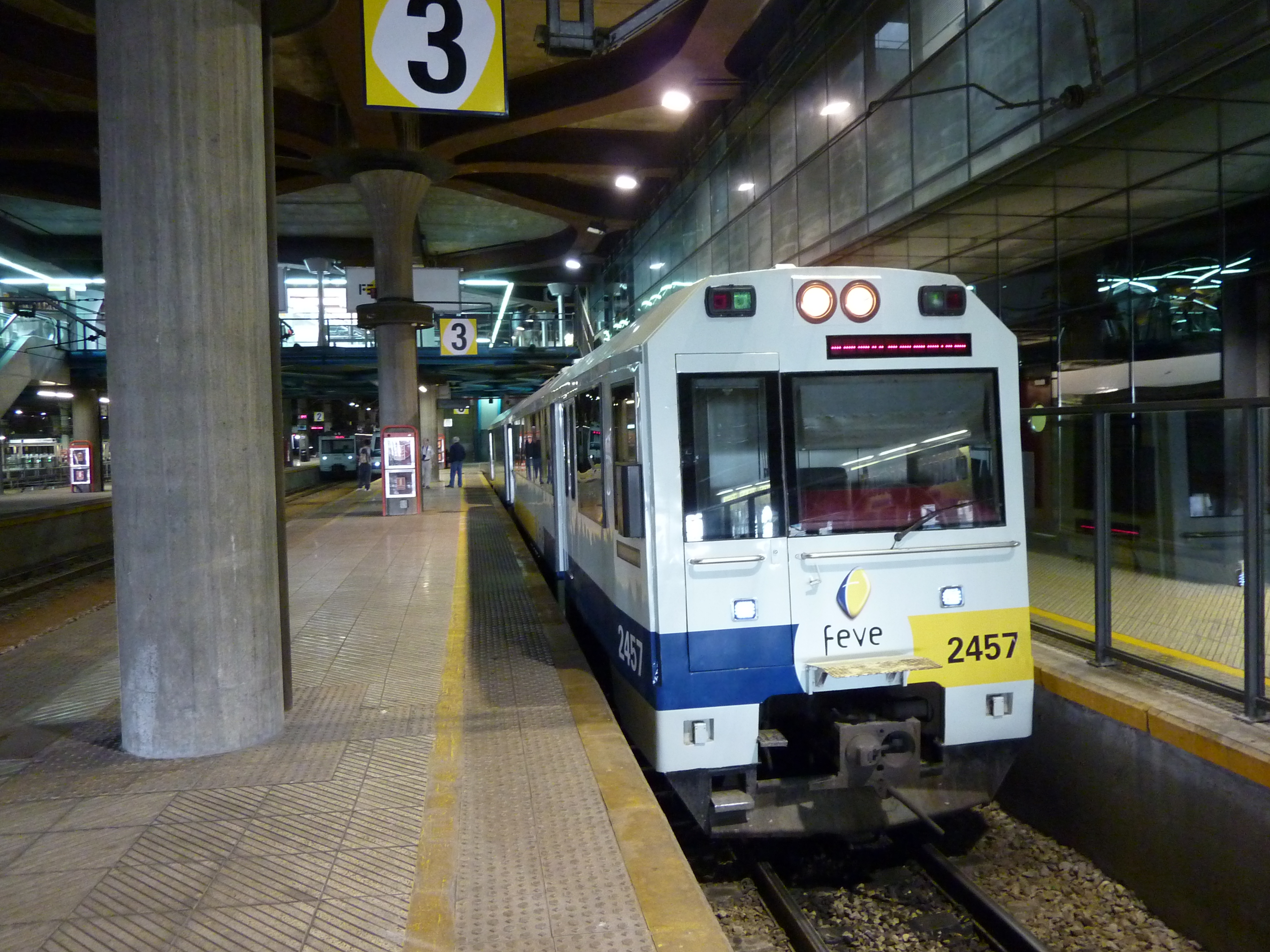
Feve train at the station

=== Suburban ===
The broad-gauge Cercanías Asturias lines C-1, C-2 and C-3 provide a high-frequency service between Oviedo and San Juan de Nieva, Gijón, El Entrego and Puente de los Fierros. Oviedo and Llamaquique are the only stations served by all three lines. The narrow-gauge Feve lines also connect Oviedo with San Esteban de Pravia and Infiesto, formerly known as lines F-6 and F-7.

Preceding station	Cercanías Asturias	Following station
Llamaquique towards Puente de los Fierros	C-1 (Cercanías Asturias)	La Corredoria towards Gijón
Llamaquique towards El Entrego	C-2 (Cercanías Asturias)	Terminus
Llamaquique Terminus	C-3 (Cercanías Asturias)	La Corredoria towards San Xuan
Terminus	C-6 (Cercanías Asturias)	Parque Principado towards L'Infiestu Apeadero
Terminus	C-7 (Cercanías Asturias)	Argañosa towards San Esteban
Terminus	C-5a (Cercanías Asturias)	Parque Principado towards Gijón

=== Tourist trains ===
Some of the narrow-gauge former Feve lines, attractive to tourists in themselves and in the scenery they pass, are used by tourist trains, previously run by Feve, and by Renfe since 2013. These are the Estrella del Cantábrico between Oviedo and Covadonga, and the Transcantábrico between León and Ferrol vía Bilbao. The latter is a de luxe or super-de luxe train. These trains run on certain dates, mainly in summer, and include museum visits and gastronomic tourism.

== See also ==
- Cercanías Asturias
- Renfe
- Adif
- Oviedo
- Gijón railway station
- León railway station
- Venta de Baños–Gijón railway
- Ferrocarriles Españoles de Vía Estrecha
- Rail transport in Spain
