= Asturias (sculpture) =

1991 sculpture by José Noja

Coordinates: 43°21′58″N 5°51′17″W

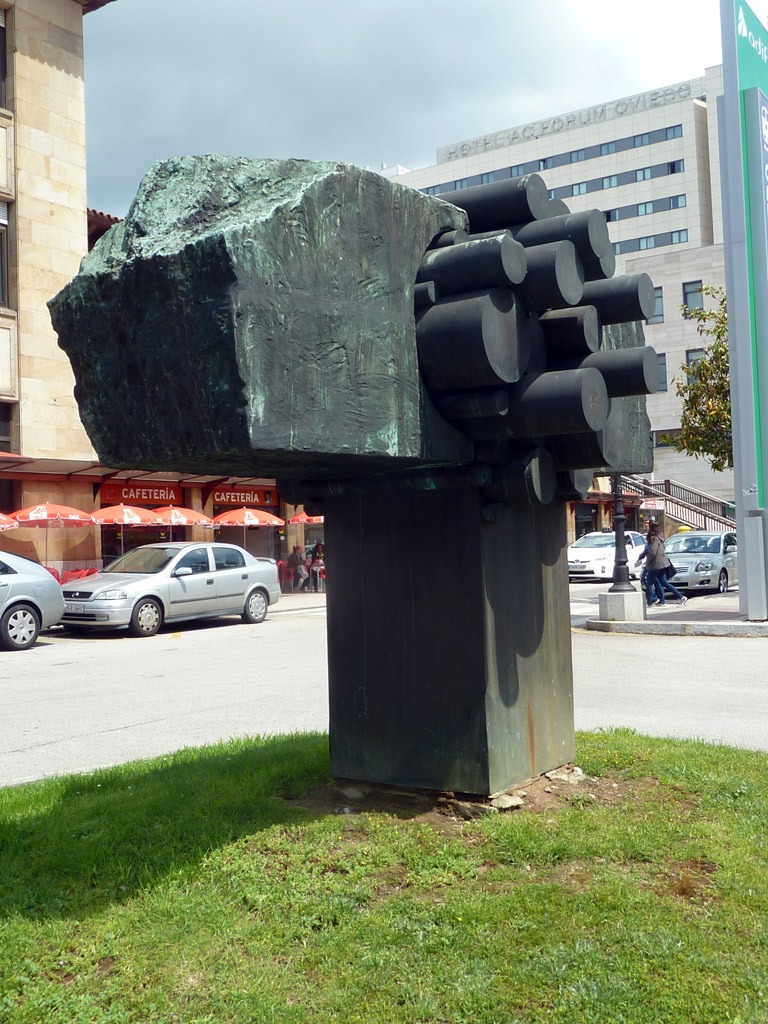
Asturias

The urban sculpture known by the name of Asturias is located in calle Uría, in front of the railway station, in the city of Oviedo, Principality of Asturias, Spain. It is one of over a hundred sculptures that adorn the streets of that city.

The sculpture, executed in coal and steel, is the work of José Noja, and dates from 1991. It was commissioned from Noja by the rail company Renfe, which sought a work of art to adorn the rail station of Oviedo. This large-scale work is intended as a homage to the Principality of Asturias, and so it incorporates materials such as coal that are characteristic of Asturian industry.
