= Asturias (surname) =

Asturias is a surname. Notable people with the surname include:

- Enrique Antonio Degenhart Asturias, Guatemalan government minister
- José Luis Asturias, Guatemalan chess master
- Miguel Ángel Asturias (1899–1974), Guatemalan poet-diplomat, novelist, playwright, and journalist
