= Cabueñes =

Coordinates: 43.52304°N 5.60620°W

- Parish
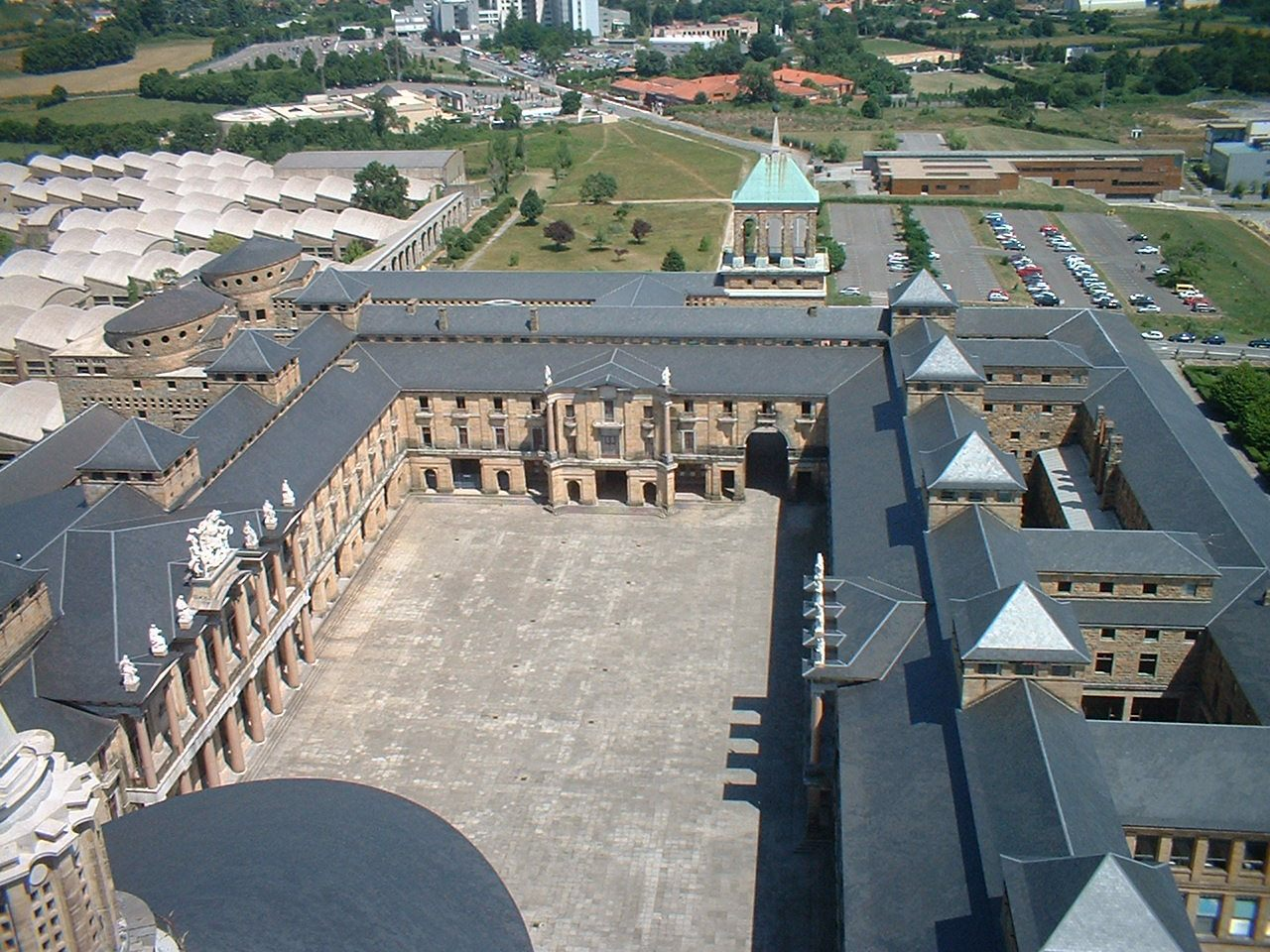
- The Universidad Laboral
- Interactive map of Cabueñes
- Country: Spain
- Autonomous community: Asturias
- Province: Asturias
- Municipality: Gijón

Population (2016)
  - Total: 1,458

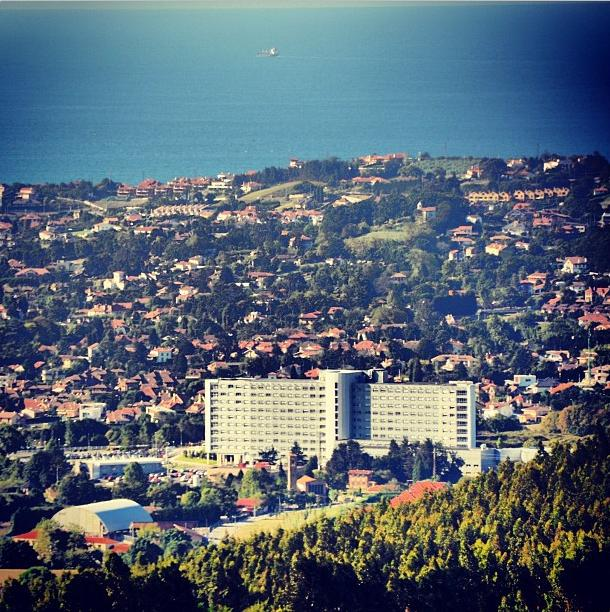
The main hospital of the city, located in the parish of Cabueñes.

Cabueñes is a parish of the municipality of Gijón, in Asturias, Spain.

Its population was 1,467 in 2012.

Cabueñes is a residential area and a public services district which borders the municipality of Villaviciosa in the east.

In this parish are located several important buildings like the University of Oviedo campus, the most important hospital of the city, the largest morgue in Gijón and the Laboral University, the largest building in Spain. In the Laboral University is located the RTPA headquarters and the LABoral Centro de Arte y Creación Industrial.

The Science park of Gijón and the Atlantic Botanical Garden are also in this parish.

== Villages and their neighbourhoods ==
Cefontes

- El Tragamón
- La Vega

Cimavilla

- La Cabaña
- La Cuesta
- La Frontera
- La Rasa

La Pontica

- L'Infanzón
- La Mangada
