= Renfe Feve =

Narrow gauge rail transport company of Spain

Renfe Cercanías AM

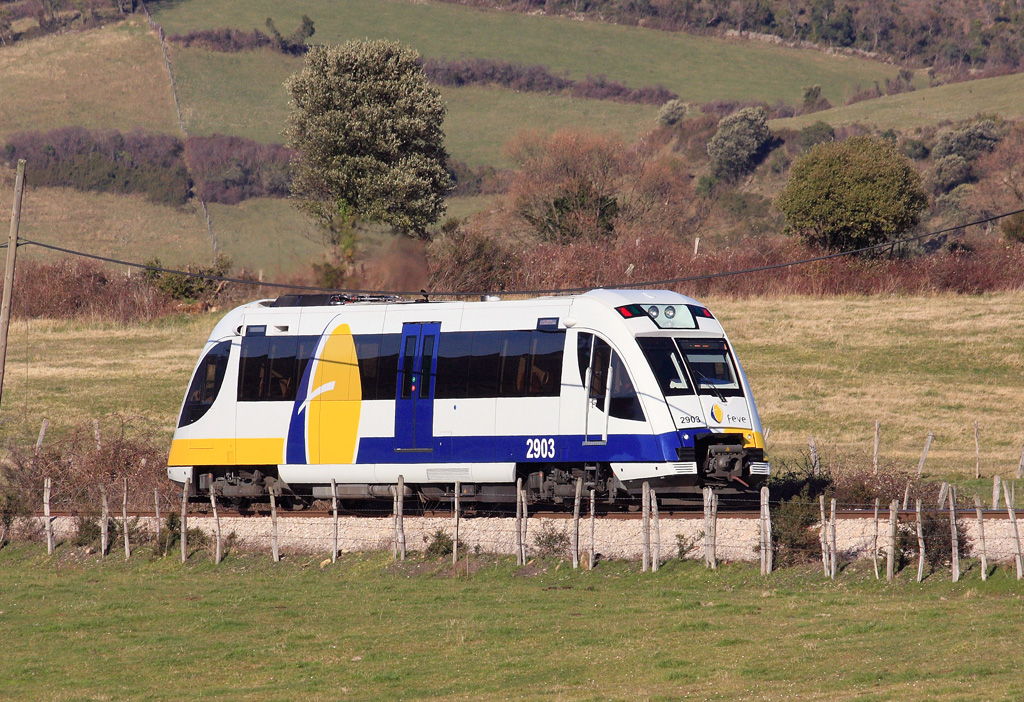
- R4 line train at Villasana de Mena

- Regional and commuter services
- Predecessor: Ferrocarriles de Vía Estrecha (FEVE)
- Formation: 6 July 1926 (as EFE); 23 September 1965 (as FEVE); 1 January 2013 (merged into Renfe, as Renfe Feve)
- Dissolved: 17 of July 2023 (most services taken away); 7 of October 2025 (fully)
- Type: State-owned company
- Purpose: Railway operatator
- Location: Spain
- Services: rail
- Owner: Renfe Operadora
- Website: renfe.com/viajeros/feve

Renfe Feve
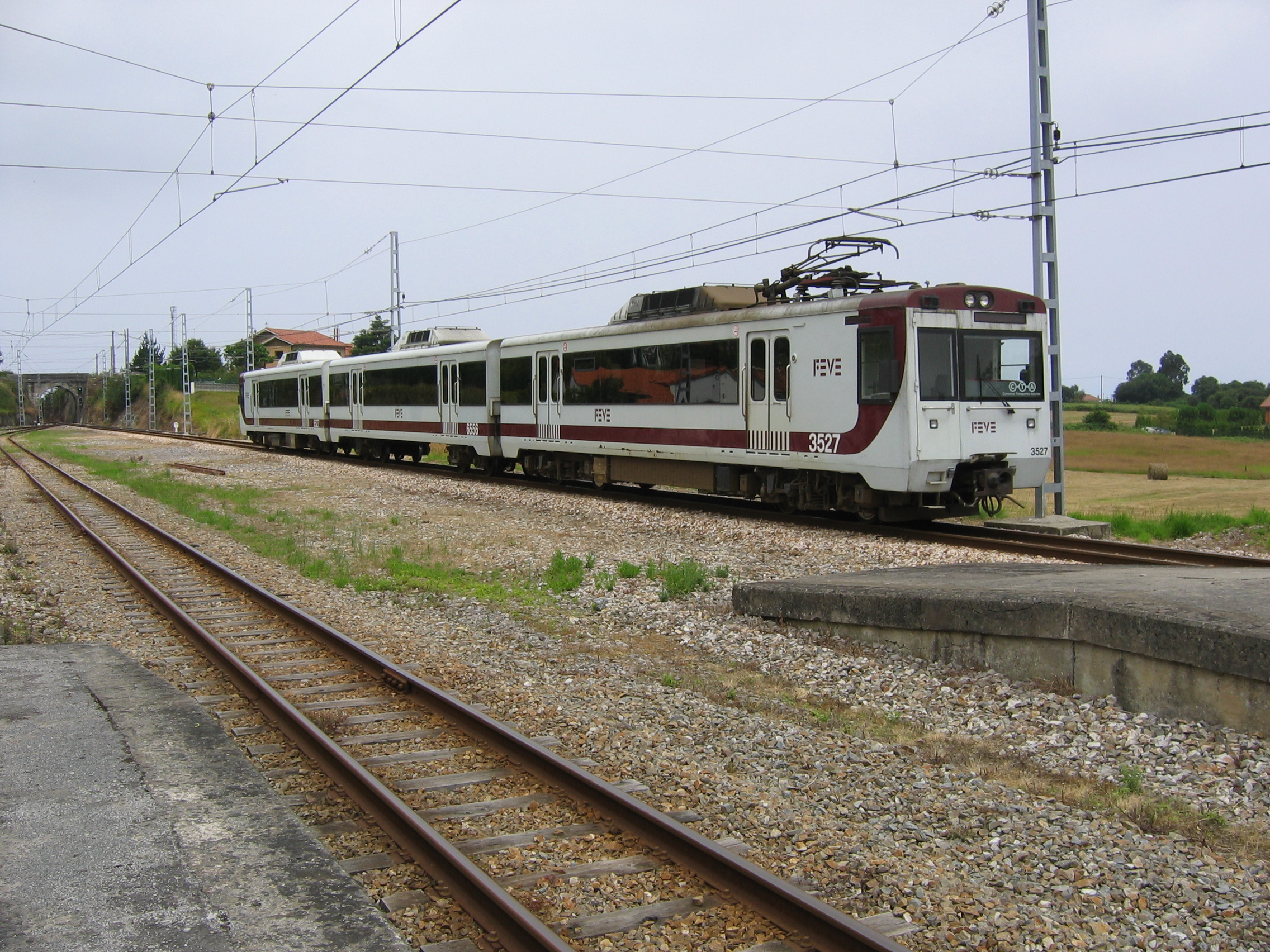
- Electric unit 3500, operated by FEVE, arriving at Muros de Nalón station, on its way to Gijón

Technical
- Track gauge: 1,000 mm (3 ft 3 3/8 in) metre gauge
- Electrification: (?)

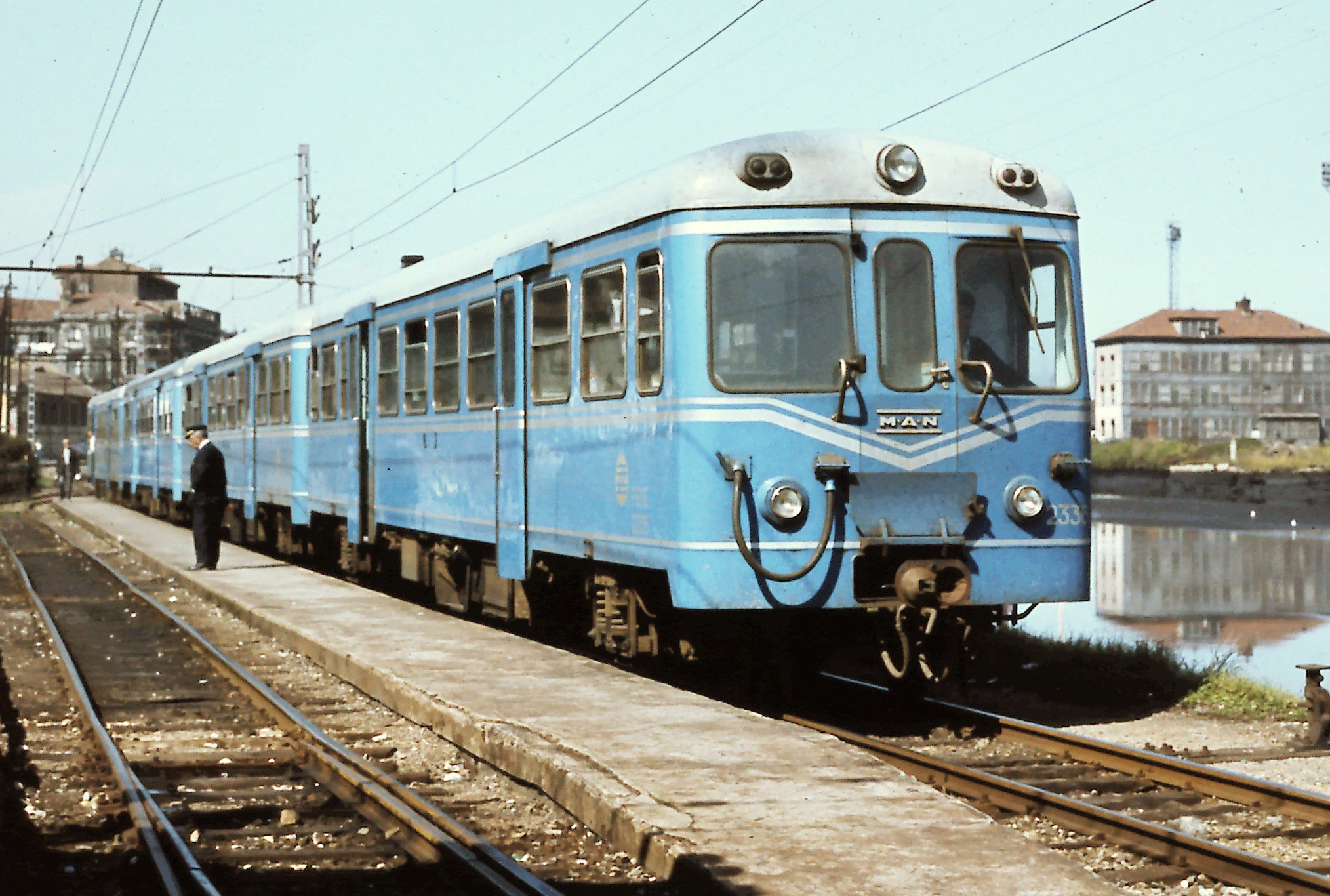
A FEVE Series 2300 train at Avilés in Asturias in 1977

Renfe Feve, known in its last years as Renfe Cercanías AM, was a division of state-owned Spanish railway company Renfe Operadora. It transitorily operated most of Spain's 1,250 km (777 mi) of metre-gauge railway. This division of Renfe was previously a stand-alone company named FEVE (Ferrocarriles de Vía Estrecha, Spanish for Narrow-Gauge Railways). On 31 December 2012, the Spanish government simplified the organization of state-owned railway companies by merging FEVE into Renfe and Adif. The rolling stock and the brand FEVE were transferred to Renfe (renamed "Renfe Feve"), while the infrastructure was transferred to Adif. In 2023 and 2025, the division's services were fully integrated into the other subdivisions Cercanías and Renfe mid distance.

== History ==
Old logo of FEVE.

FEVE was created in 1965, as a successor to the government-run organisation EFE (Explotación de Ferrocarriles por el Estado), which was created by the Miguel Primo de Rivera administration in 1926 to take over failed private railways. Following the creation of RENFE in 1941, to which the ownership of all Spanish broad-gauge railways were transferred to, EFE had in practice become the operator of a collection of exclusively narrow-gauge lines. The present status of FEVE, as a government-owned commercial company, dates from 1965.

The new company continued to absorb independent railway lines (1,435 mm or 4 ft 8 1/2 in standard gauge, 1,067 mm or 3 ft 6 in, 1,000 mm or 3 ft 3 3/8 in, 914 mm or 3 ft & 750 mm or 2 ft 5 1/2 in), where the existing concession holders had been unable to be profitable. Most were converted to 1,000 mm (3 ft 3 3/8 in) metre gauge (if not already built in that gauge). However, from 1978 onwards, with the introduction of regional devolution under the new Spanish constitution, FEVE also began transferring responsibility for a number of its operations to the new regional governments. This happened in Catalonia (FGC) in 1979, in a portion of the Basque (Euskotren) network in 1982, in the Valencian Community (FGV) in 1986, and with the Mallorcan Railways (SFM) in 1994. That did not however occur in the Region of Murcia, where the narrow-gauge railway network remained under FEVE control. The above-mentioned EFE (Explotación de Ferrocarriles por el Estado) also operated the Carabanchel – Chamartín de la Rosa suburbano railway in the city of Madrid. That railway became part of the Madrid Metro when control of that line was transferred to the Community of Madrid in the early-1980s, later integrated as the present-day Line 10.

On 31 December 2012, the company disappeared due to the merger of the narrow gauge network FEVE and the broad gauge network RENFE. The infrastructure was transferred to Adif and the rolling stock was transferred to Renfe Operadora. The operation of the narrow gauge network continued under the same conditions after the reorganization, effectively still working separately. This led to underfunding and ignoration issues that culminated in the order of new trains that would not have fitted in the metric gauge network and the order being paused for years. This prompted Renfe to finish the merger and integrate Renfe Feve into the other subdivisions Cercanías and Renfe mid distance.

== FEVE network ==
The great majority of the narrow-gauge lines that were operated by FEVE before it disappeared were located along or near Spain's Atlantic Ocean and Bay of Biscay coastline, which stretches from Galicia in the northwest, through Asturias and Cantabria to the Basque Country (with a branch extending into Castile and León). Together they formed a large and strategically important system, which was why – unlike the other, more isolated regional railways – they have been retained under the integrated management of FEVE.

FEVE operated 1,192 km (741 mi) of track, of which 316 km (196 mi) were electrified.

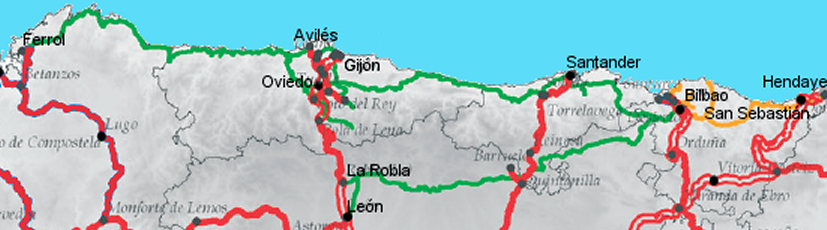
FEVE lines in green, Euskotren Trena in yellow and broad gauge lines in red. Transcantábrico line goes all the way from Hendaye to León and Ferrol.

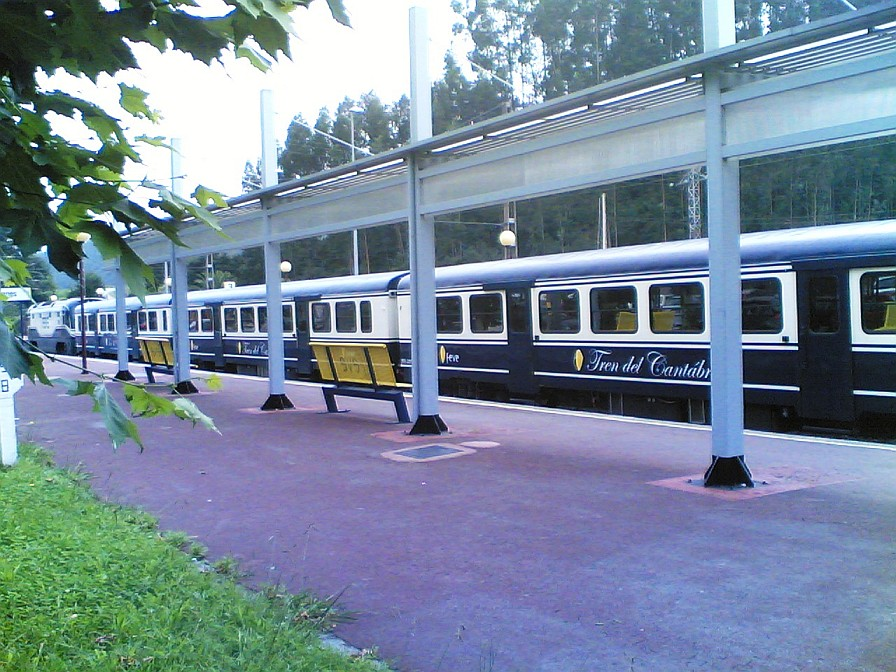
Transcantábrico in Liérganes station

=== Transcantábrico line ===
An exclusive tourist service operated by FEVE is a 650 km (400 mi) long line, the Transcantábrico, which runs along the entire length of Spain's north coast, and has connected the cities of San Sebastián, Bilbao, Santander, Oviedo and Ferrol to Leon since 1982. Operated as a holiday service, the carriages of the train are furnished with bedrooms, lounges and restaurants and voyages typically last eight days and seven nights.

FEVE also operated "normal" regional (express and stopping) services (in sections) from Ferrol to Hendaye (some sections operated now by regional operators). One of the longest regular (non-tourist) FEVE service operated between Leon and Bilbao (a journey of some 7 hours).

=== Commuter services ===
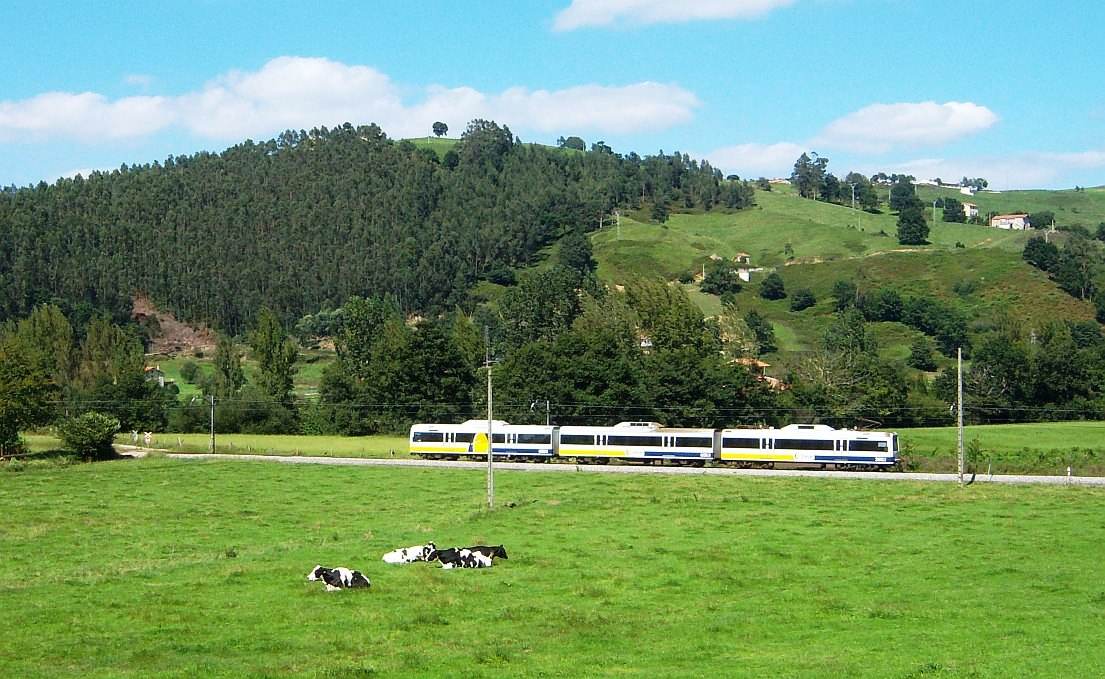
FEVE unit from Santander to Liérganes

Renfe Feve also operated a range of cercanías or commuter services. The main commuter area is Cercanías Asturias, where the dense five-line FEVE network was semi-integrated with the RENFE lines and works effectively as a regional metro system. When FEVE was integrated into Renfe, the systems stayed separated for over 10 years until the fat train scandal.

The Bilbao area has a line running from Bilbao's Concordia station to the town of Balmaseda, calling at local villages and settlements on its way through Biscay, as well as the main towns of Sodupe, Aranguren, and Zalla.

Two commuter lines begin at Santander railway station and terminate at Liérganes and Cabezón de la Sal.

In southern Spain, Renfe Feve operates the historic Cartagena–Los Nietos line.

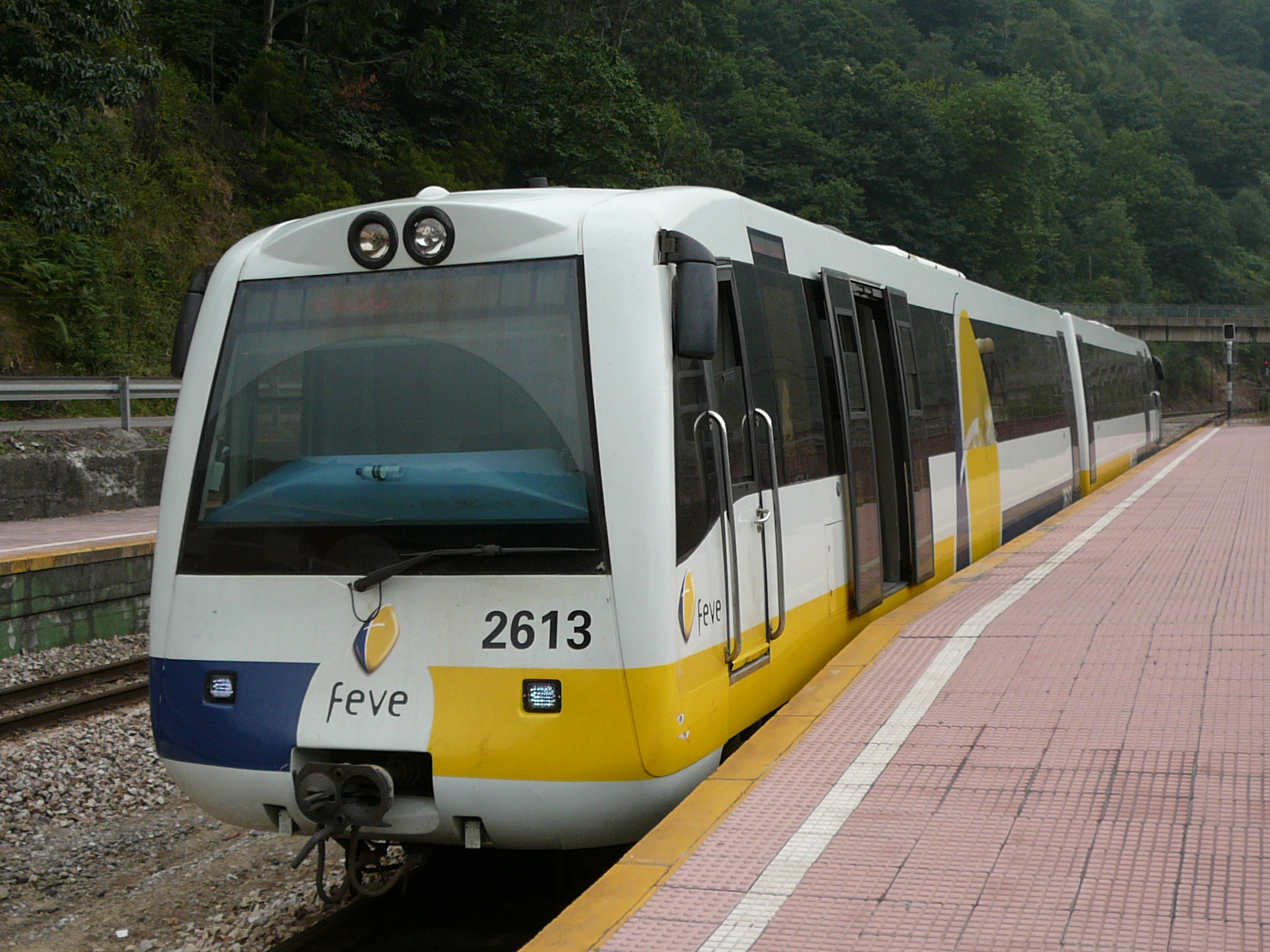
FEVE diesel multiple unit near Mieres

== See also ==
- Transport in Spain
- History of rail transport in Spain
- Narrow-gauge railways in Portugal
