= Ablaña railway station =

Railway station in Ablaña, Spain

Ablaña
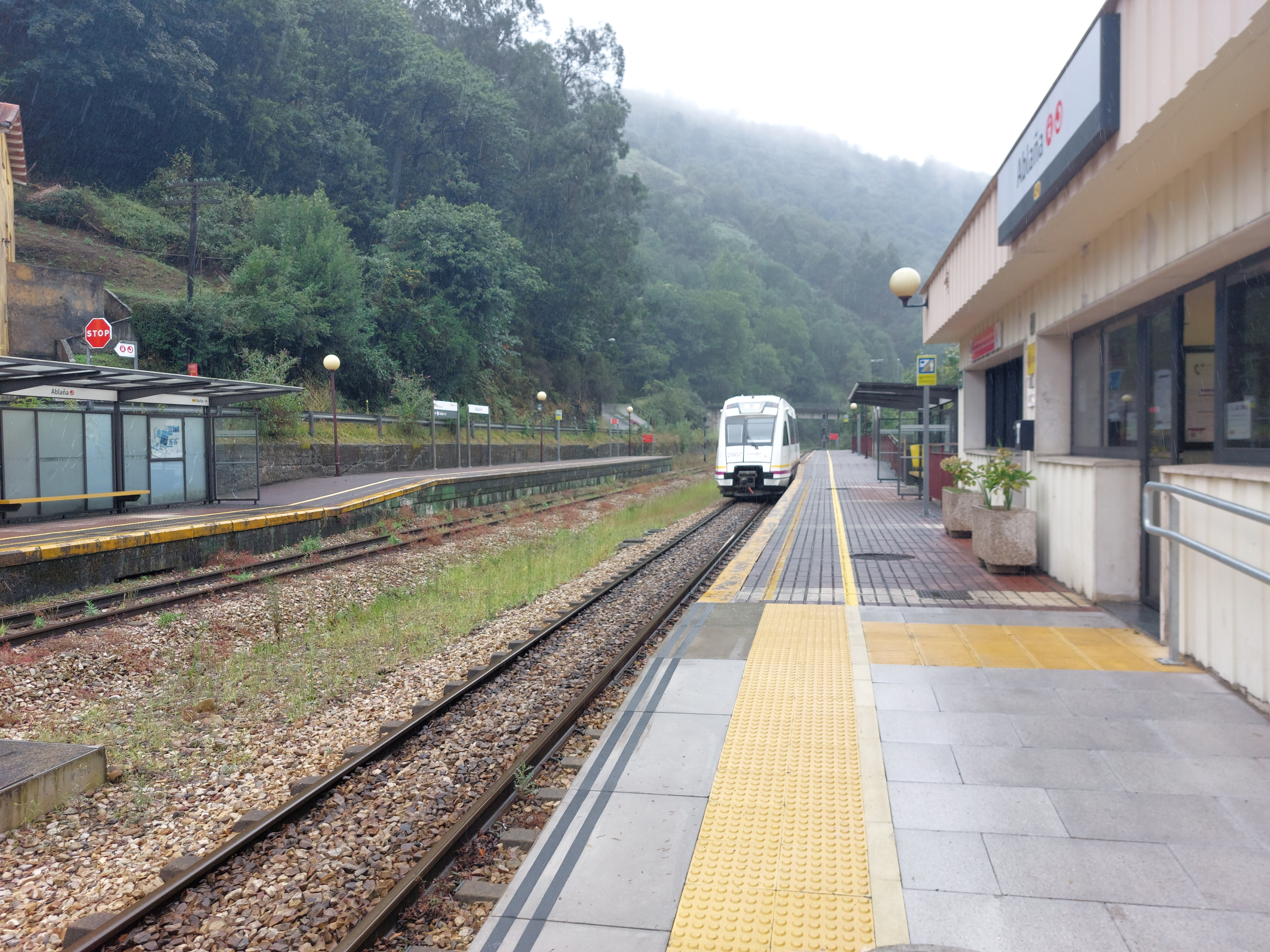
- Ablaña Station (narrow-gauge section)

General information
- Location: Mieres; Asturias; Spain
- Coordinates: 43°16′01.75″N 5°48′21.2″W
- Operator
- Transit authority: Adif
- Platforms: 4
- Tracks: 4

Construction
- Structure type: At-grade
- Accessible: yes

Other information
- Station code: 15205
- Fare zone: 2
- Website: www.adif.es/w/15205-abla%C3%B1a

History
- Opened: 23 July 1874
- Pre-nationalisation: Norte and Vasco
Services
Preceding station	Cercanías Asturias	Following station
Mieres-Puente towards Puente de los Fierros	C-1 (Cercanías Asturias)	La Pereda-Riosa towards Gijón
Mieres-Vasco towards Coḷḷanzo	C-8 (Cercanías Asturias)	La Perea towards Baiña
Location

Ablaña station is a railway station in Mieres, Asturias, Spain. It is owned by Adif and operated by Renfe.

== Services ==
This station is served by C-1 Cercanías Asturias and C-8 Cercanías Asturias lines.

== Station layout ==
The station consists of an Iberian-gauge and a narrow-gauge section. Each section has two platforms served by two tracks

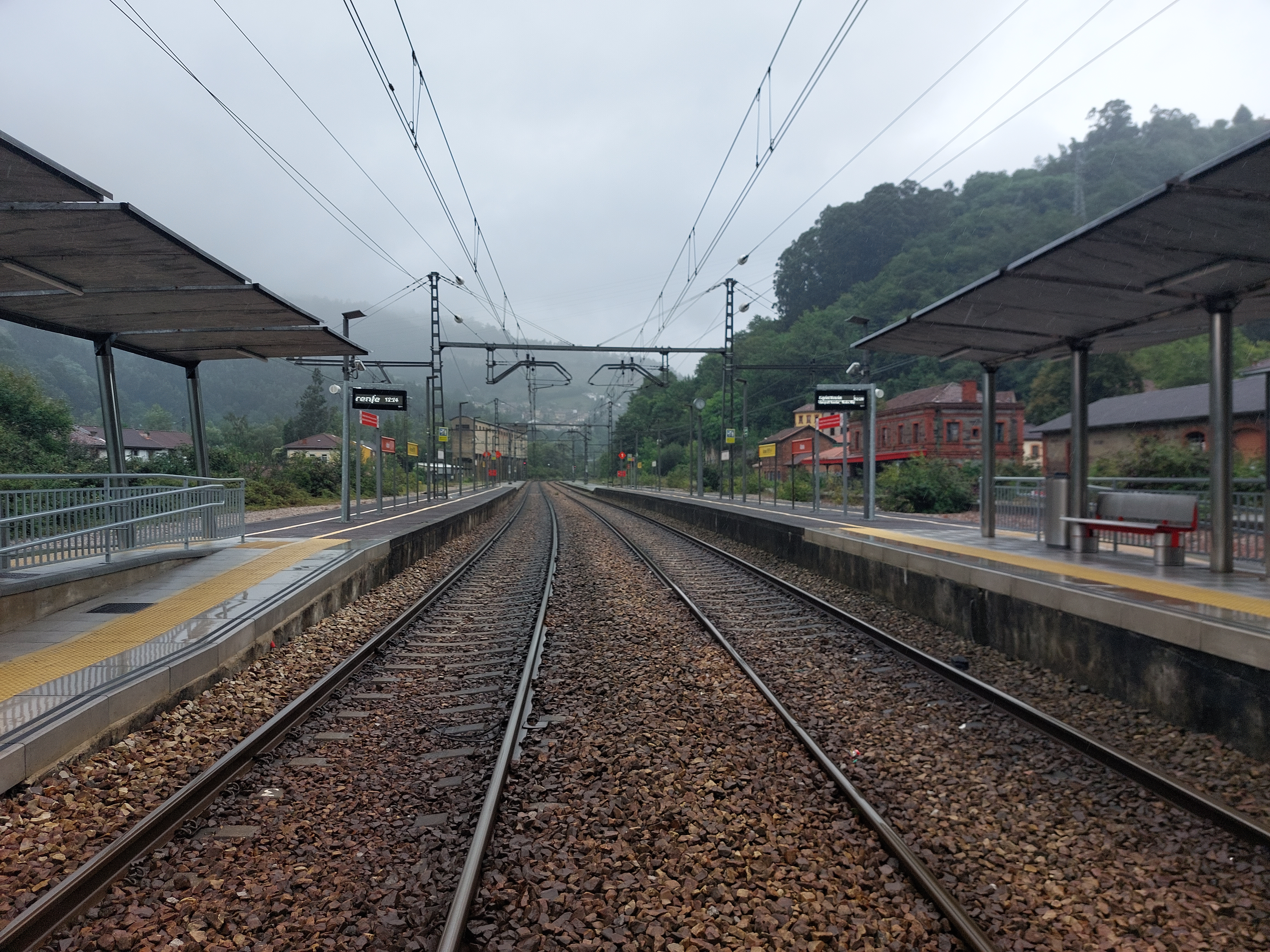

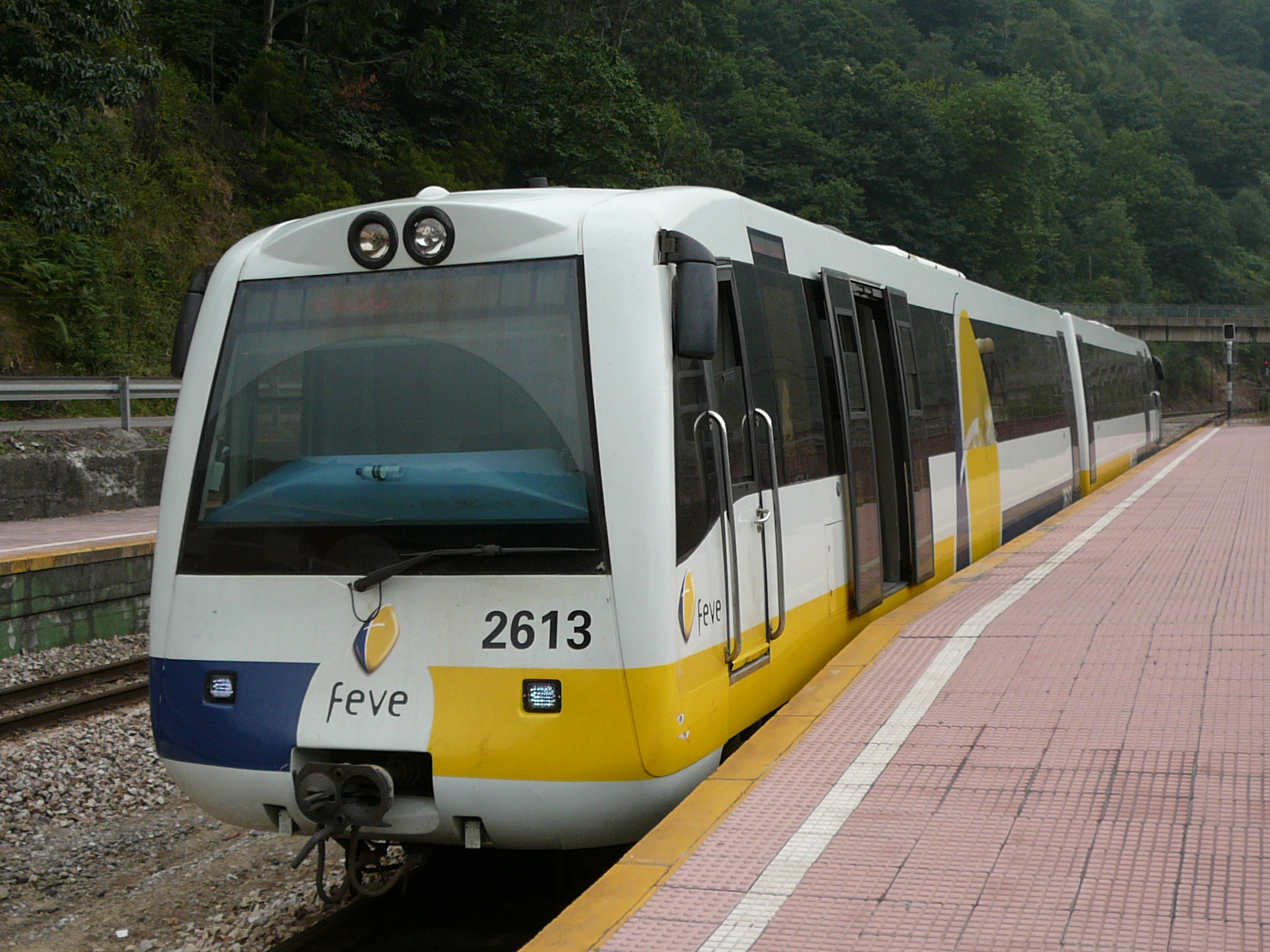

== History ==
Compañía de Ferrocarril del Noroeste de España built Ablaña station in 1874 as part of the Pola de Lena-Gijón line that would be linked later with the section between Leon and Busdongo. This station was a stop in services bound for León and Madrid.

Sociedad General de Ferrocarriles Vasco Asturiana devised an extension of its railway, opened in 1904, that transported coal to the port of San Esteban in Pravia and the narrow-gauge section was added in 1906.

In 1941, the new Francoist regime nationalised all the Iberian gauge railways in Spain and Norte's assets into the newly formed Renfe.

In the late 50's, a hopper was built next to the Iberian-gauge section in order to transport coal from Nicolasa mine to El Batán, a coal washing site.

In 1972, the ownership the narrow-gauge section was transferred to FEVE, a government-owned company established with the objective of operating all narrow-gauge railway lines within Spain. In 2005, Adif became the owner of the infrastructure and the management of railway lines that were part of RENFE, which became a mere operator. In a similar move, Adif took over the narrow-gauge section of this station in 2013 with the integration of Feve in Renfe and Adif.
