= C-8 (Cercanías Asturias) =

Spanish commuter rail service

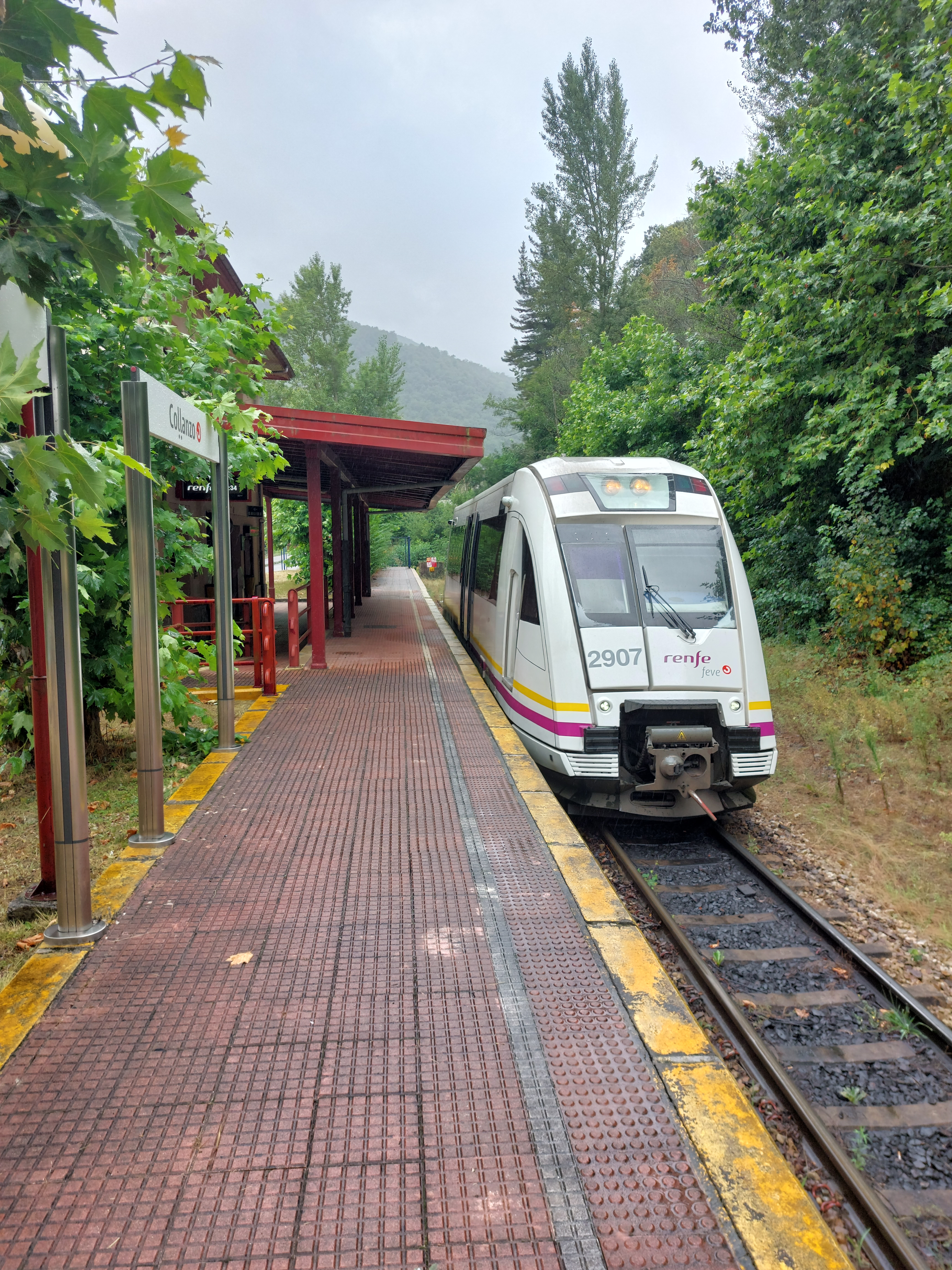
- A Renfe 529 Series train on C-8 line at Coḷḷanzo terminal station in 2022.

Overview
- Service type: Commuter rail
- System: Cercanías Asturias
- Status: Operational
- Locale: Asturias, Spain
- Current operator(s): Renfe Operadora

Route
- Termini: Baiña; Coḷḷanzo
- Stops: 18
- Distance travelled: 34.5 km
- Line(s) used: Coḷḷanzo−Trubia railway line

Technical
- Rolling stock: Renfe 529 Series Diesel
- Track gauge: 1,000 mm (3 ft 3 3/8 in) metre gauge
- Electrification: no
- Track owner(s): Adif

The C-8 line is a rail service of Cercanías Asturias commuter rail network, operated by Renfe Operadora. Its termini are Baiña and Coḷḷanzo stations.

== History ==
The defunct Sociedad General de Ferrocarriles Vasco Asturiana inaugurated this line as part of its Oviedo-San Esteban de Pravia line, which was opened in 1904. The railway was born with the goal of transporting coal to the port of San Esteban in Pravia. In the following years, the line was extended from Fuso de la Reina to Figareo in 1906 and subsequently to Uxo-Taruelo in 1908.

During the 1920s, this line was consolidated as a key infrastructure for Asturian industry, and plans were devised to extend it to La Robla in León. By 1934, the railway line had reached Cabanaquinta, and by 1935, it had reached Coḷḷanzo. As a consequence of the political turmoil that suffered Asturias due to the Asturian Revolution in 1934, the initial plans to extend the line to León were ultimately abandoned.

In the latter half of the 20th century, railway freight transport lost its economic significance, and Ferrocarril de El Vasco accumulated a considerable amount of debts. Consequently, in 1972, the ownership of this line was transferred to FEVE, a government-owned company established with the objective of operating all narrow-gauge railway lines within Spain. From that point freight transport was discontinued and this line was exclusively used for passenger transport. The lack of investment in its infrastructure, the opening of new road sections branching from the A-66 highway leading to Oviedo and the closure of the Fuso de la Reina branch to Oviedo due to an urbanistic project called the Green Belt caused that its number of passengers dwindled every year until the service from Baiña to Trubia was discontinued in 2009, thus disconnecting the two lines that used to run on the old Ferrocarril del Vasco line. Following the integration of Feve into Renfe Feve in 2012 (renamed as Renfe Cercanías AM in 2021), this lack of investment was aggravated and infrastructure deteriorated a bridge presented unfixable structural damage and daily commuting has been repeatedly interrupted due to the poor conditions of the rolling stock. Consequently, the number of passengers dropped once again. The security system ASFA, installed in 2021, is not well adjusted to the characteristics narrow-gauge lines, thus train services are slower than decades ago.

== Extension plans ==
In 2009, the president of FEVE agreed to extend the line to Felechosa and to present its building project by 2012. Local politicians argued that it would be beneficial for the municipality since the Fuentes de Invierno ski resort is located nearby. Nevertheless, no project was ever made public.

== Rolling Stock ==
Current:

- 529 Series (former FEVE 2900 Series)
- 527 Series (former FEVE 2700 Series)
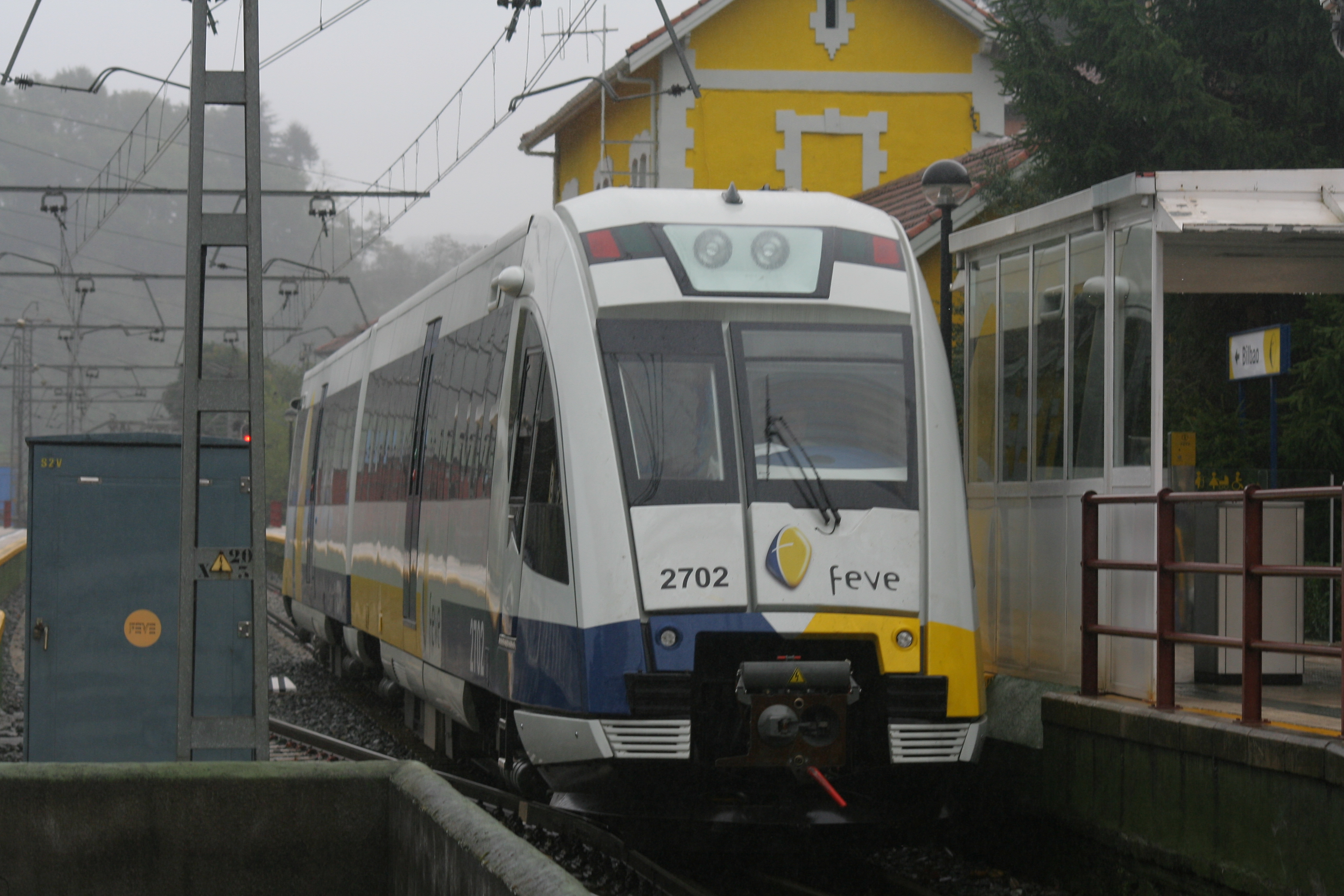
527 Series

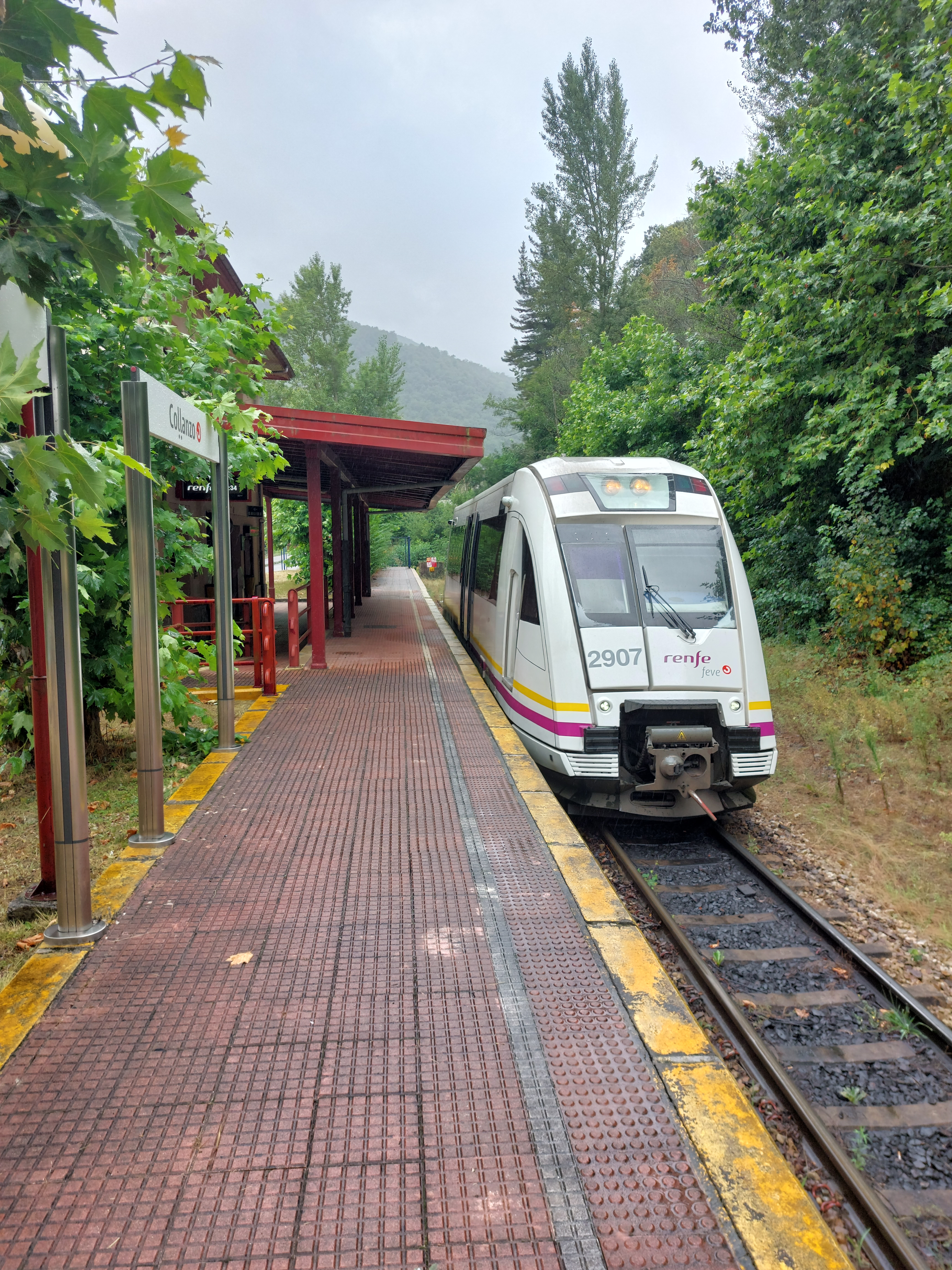
529 Series

== Stations ==
Station	Transfers	Location	Fare Zone
Baiña		Mieres	2
La Pereda-Riosa		Mieres	2
Ablaña		Mieres	2
Mieres del Camín-El Vasco		Mieres	2
Santuyano-Caudalia		Mieres	2
Figareo		Mieres	2
Uxo-Taruelo		Mieres	2
Santa Cruz		Mieres	2
Caborana		Ayer	2
Morea		Ayer	2
L'Oyanco		Ayer	2/3
San Antonio		Ayer	3
Piñeres		Ayer	3
Corigo		Ayer	3
Santana-Soto		Ayer	3
Cabanaquinta		Ayer	3
Ḷḷevinco		Ayer	3
Coḷḷanzo		Ayer	3
