= C-3 (Cercanías Asturias) =

Spanish commuter rail service

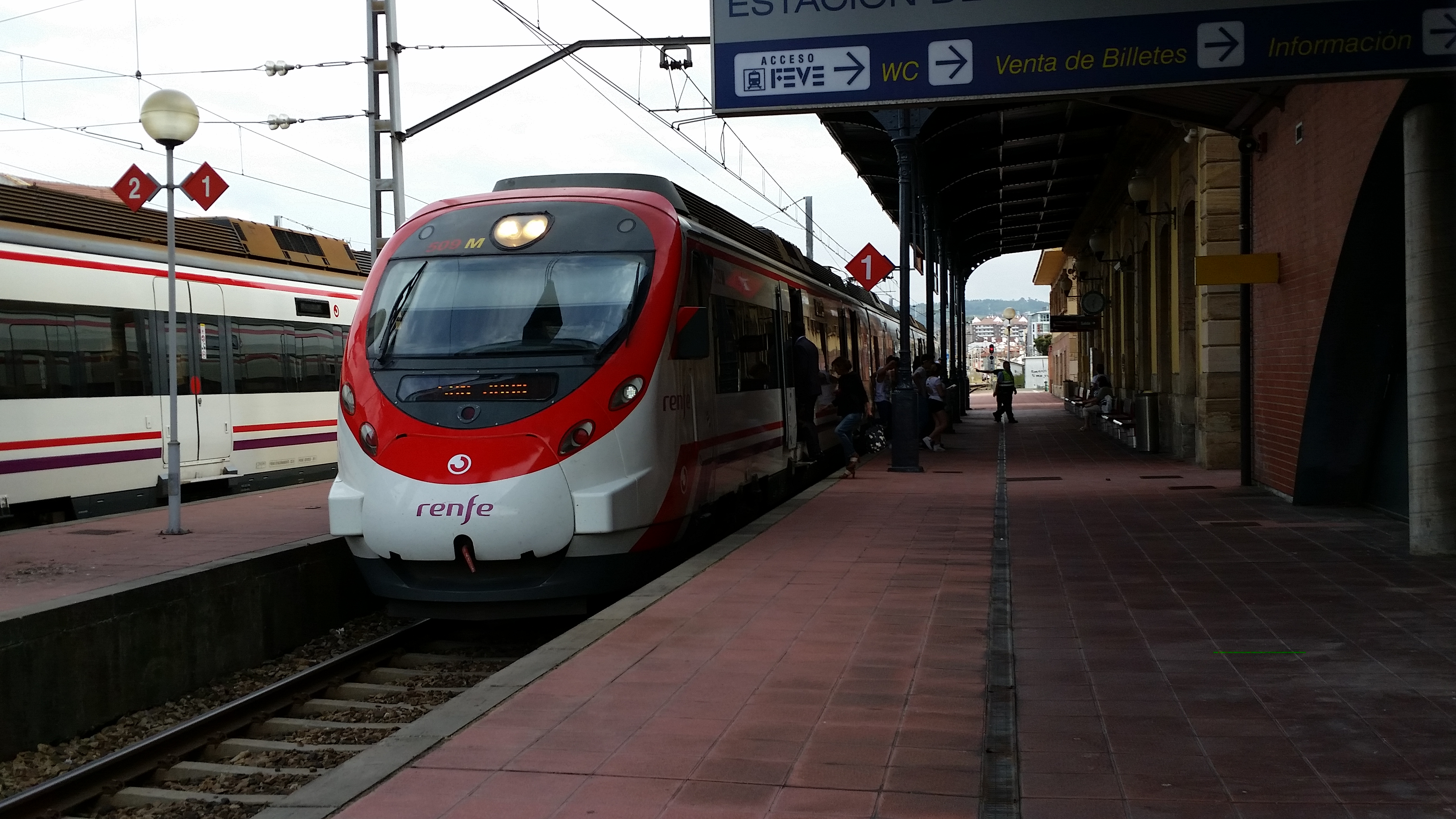
- A Civia train on C-3 line at Avilés terminal station in 2017.

Overview
- Service type: Commuter rail
- System: Cercanías Asturias
- Status: Operational
- Locale: Asturias, Spain
- Current operator: Renfe Operadora

Route
- Termini: Llamaquique; San Xuan
- Stops: 14
- Distance travelled: 23.6 km
- Line used: Avilés-Villabona railway line

Technical
- Rolling stock: Civia EMUs
- Track gauge: 1,668 mm (5 ft 5 21/32 in) Iberian gauge
- Electrification: 3kV AC overhead line
- Track owner: Adif

The C-3 line is a rail service of Cercanías Asturias commuter rail network, operated by Renfe Operadora, connecting the most populated urban areas in Asturias. Its termini are Llamaquique and San Xuan stations.

== History ==
Towards the end of the 19th century, plans were put in place to connect Avilés with the Gijón-León railway line, with the objective of transporting coal to the port. The original intention was for Crédito general de ferro-carriles to commence construction works, but due to financial constraints, the line was transferred to Compañía de los Caminos de Hierro del Norte de España in 1886 before completion. The line commenced service to Avilés in 1890 and was extended to San Xuan in 1894.

In the decades that followed, Norte opened several sections that split off from the main line in Asturias. In 1936, during the Spanish Civil War, the company suffered serious economic damage. After the war, the company's financial situation was extremely poor and in 1941 the new Francoist regime nationalised all the Iberian gauge railways in Spain and incorporated them into the newly formed Renfe.

After nationalisation, the Spanish government electrified the line in 1955 to transport goods more effectively, benefiting the steel company ENSIDESA.

In the following decades this line was used for freight and passengers transportation and its services were commonly known as "Cercanías", but it was perceived as unreliable, so Renfe began plans to create a defined and organised service. However, it was not until 1989 that this name became official, when Renfe created a division responsible for planning and organising these services.

== Rolling Stock ==
Nowadays all services are operated by Civia models

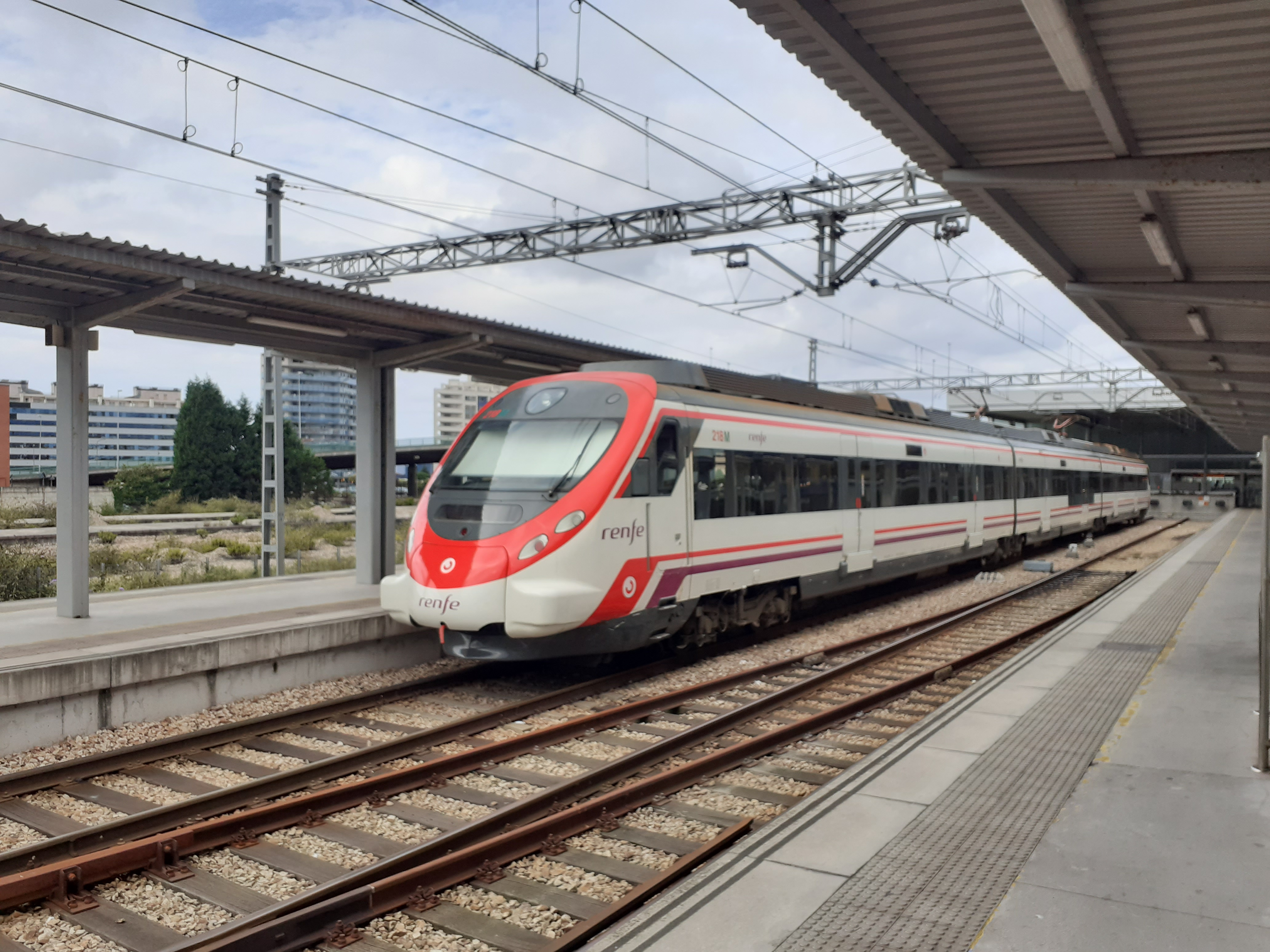

== Stations ==
Legend:

CIVIS (express train service) :

●: Stops, ｜: Does not stop *Only the first service in the morning

Station	CIVIS	Transfers (Cercanías)	Transfers (Other services)	Location	Fare Zone
Llamaquique	●		Regional	Oviedo	1
Oviedo	●		Regional	Oviedo	1
La Corredoria	●			Oviedo	1
Lugones	●			Siero	1/2
Lugo de Llanera	●			Llanera	2
Villabona de Asturias	｜			Llanera	2
Ferroñes	｜			Llanera	2/3
Cancienes	｜			Corvera	3
Nubledo	｜			Corvera	3
Los Campos	｜			Corvera	3
Villalegre	｜			Avilés	3
La Rocica	｜			Avilés	3/4-B
Avilés	●			Avilés	4-B
San Xuan	｜			Castrillón	4-B
