= C-4 (Cercanías Asturias) =

Spanish commuter rail service

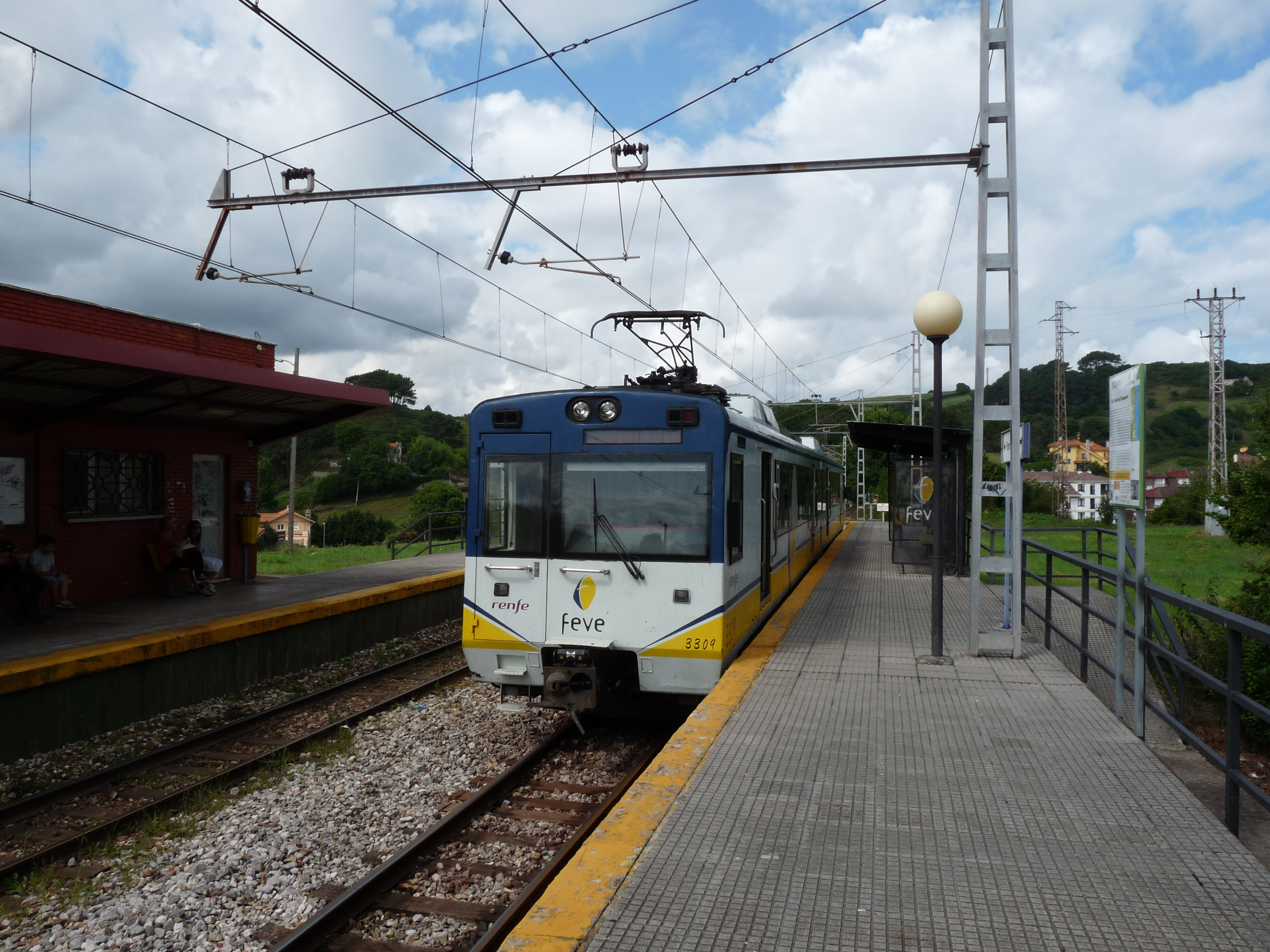
- A Renfe 3300 Series train on C-4 line at Perlora station in 2015.

Overview
- Service type: Commuter rail
- System: Cercanías Asturias
- Status: Operational
- Locale: Asturias, Spain
- Current operator: Renfe Operadora

Route
- Termini: Gijón; Cudillero
- Stops: 33
- Line used: Ferrol−Gijón railway line

Technical
- Track gauge: 1,000 mm (3 ft 3 3/8 in) metre gauge
- Electrification: yes 1500kV AC overhead line
- Track owner: Adif

The C-4 line is a rail service of Cercanías Asturias commuter rail network, operated by Renfe Operadora. Its termini are Gijón and Cudillero stations.

== History ==
The first section of this line was inaugurated as a freight line in 1908 by Ferrocarilles de Carreño. This section started in Aboño, passed through important mining areas and ended in El Musel, the port of Gijón. Its purpose was to transport coal and iron ore to Gijón. The Aboño-Gijón section was electrified in 1950. Construction of the railway connection between Ferrol and Gijón commenced in 1956 on Asturian soil and reached Pravia. Finally, the line was extended to its current terminus in Cudillero in 1962. In 1968, an agreement was reached with Ferrocarriles de Langreo to extend the line in Gijón to El Humedal station. In 1972, the ownership of this line was transferred to FEVE, a government-owned company established with the objective of operating all narrow-gauge railway lines within Spain. In the 1980s and 1990s, as part of a national strategy to convert freight lines into efficient commuter routes, works to electrify the remainder of the line commenced and concluded in Cudillero in 1994. Following the integration of Feve into Renfe Feve in 2012 (renamed as Renfe Cercanías AM in 2021), due to the lack of investment, infrastructure has been deteriorating and the poor conditions of the rolling stock have repeatedly caused service cancellations in the past years.

== Rolling Stock ==
Current:

- 3300 Series (former FEVE 3300 Series)
- 3600 Series (former FEVE 3600 Series)
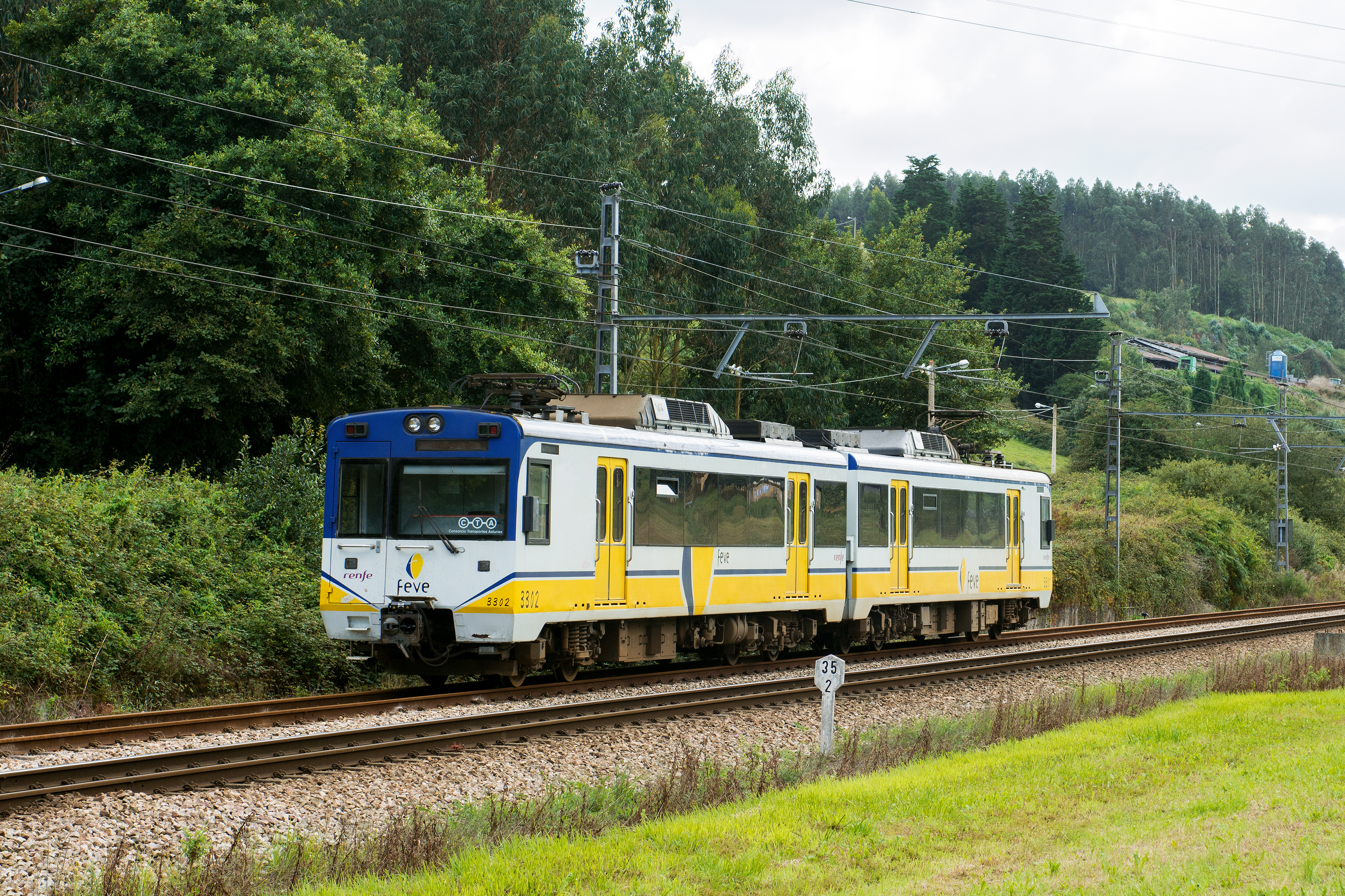
3300 Series

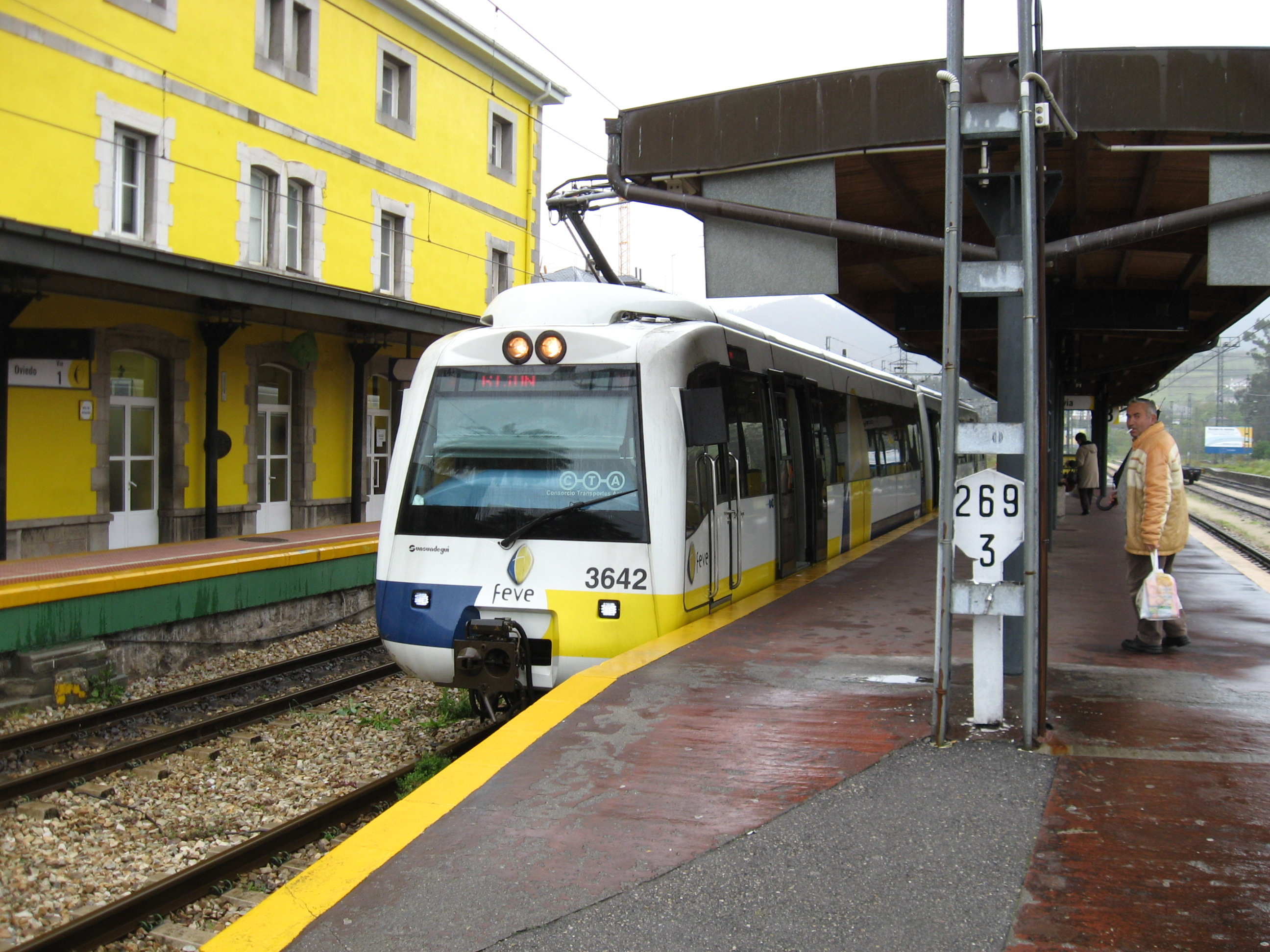
3600 Series

== Stations ==
Station	Transfers	Transfers (other services)	Location	Fare Zone
Gijón	C-1 (Cercanías Asturias) C-5 (Cercanías Asturias) C-5a (Cercanías Asturias)	Regional	Gijón	4D
Tremañes-Carreño			Gijón	4D
Centru de Transportes			Gijón	4D
Veriña	C-1 (Cercanías Asturias)		Gijón	4D
Aboño			Carreño	4D
Xivares			Carreño	4D
Perlora			Carreño	4D
Candás (apeadero)			Carreño	4D
Candás			Carreño	4C/4D
El Regueral			Carreño	4C
San Zanbornín			Carreño	4C
Gudín-Llaminación			Corvera	4C
Trasona/Tresona			Corvera	4C
Oficines			Avilés	4C
Llaranes			Avilés	4C
Avilés (apeadero)			Avilés	4B/4C
Avilés	C-3 (Cercanías Asturias)		Avilés	4B
Cristalería			Avilés	4B
Raíces Nuevo/La Fundición			Castrillón	4B
Salinas			Castrillón	4B
Piedrasblancas			Castrillón	4B
Vegarrozadas			Castrillón	4B
Santiagu'l Monte			Soto del Barco	4A/4B
El Parador			Soto del Barco	4A
Sotu'l Barcu			Soto del Barco	4A
Riberas			Soto del Barco	4A
Peñaullán			Pravia	4A
Pravia	C-7 (Cercanías Asturias)	Regional	Pravia	4A
Santianes			Pravia	4A
Los Cabos			Pravia	4A
Muros de Nalón		Regional	Muros de Nalón	4A
El Pito-Piñera			Cudillero	4A
Cudillero		Regional	Cudillero	4A
