= Villalegre railway station =

Railway station in Avilés, Spain

Villalegre
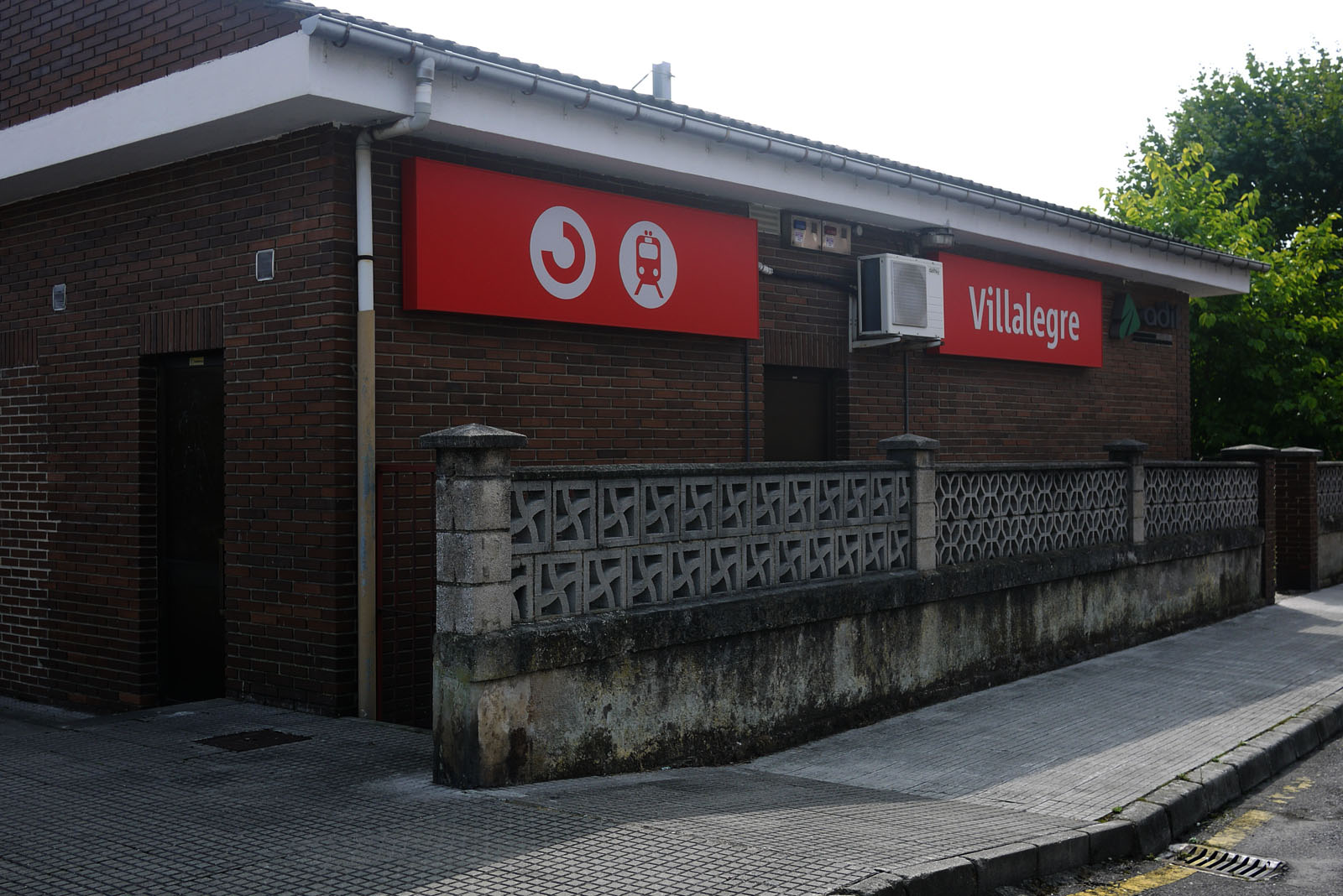
- Villalegre Station Building

General information
- Location: Avilés; Asturias; Spain
- Coordinates: 43°32′25″N 5°54′08″W
- Operator
- Transit authority: Adif
- Platforms: 2
- Tracks: 2
- Connections: Bus terminal

Construction
- Structure type: At-grade
- Parking: yes
- Accessible: yes

Other information
- Fare zone: 3
- Website: www.adif.es/w/16401-villalegre

History
- Opened: 26 July 1890
- Pre-nationalisation: Norte
Services
Preceding station	Cercanías Asturias	Following station
Los Campos towards Llamaquique	C-3 (Cercanías Asturias) Civis	La Rocica towards San Xuan
Los Campos towards Llamaquique	C-3 (Cercanías Asturias) Local	La Rocica towards San Xuan
Location

Villalegre station is a station in Avilés, Asturias, Spain. It is owned by Adif and operated by Renfe.

== Services ==
This station is served by C-3 Cercanías Asturias line.

== History ==
Villalegre Station was opened in 1890, just 20 days after works on the railway connection between Villabona and San Xuan were completed by Norte.

The original Villalegre station consisted of a large wooden building with an adjoining house for the worker who raised and lowered the gate at the nearby railway crossing. As well as being used by commuters working in the industrial area, it originally played an important role in the transport of goods unloading logs and beetroot for the local factories and loading coal bound for San Xuan to be exported by ship.

In 1941, the new Francoist regime nationalised all the Iberian gauge railways in Spain and Norte's assets into the newly formed Renfe. In the following decades, freight transport dramatically decreased due to a lack of competitiveness compared to lorries. Consequently, the wooden station building was demolished and substituted by the current station in 1990. In 1998, its surroundings were refurbished in order to allocate space for parking slots for bicycles and cars. In 2005, Adif became the owner of the infrastructure and the management of railway lines that were part of RENFE, which became a mere operator.
