= Avilés railway station =

Railway station in Avilés, Spain

Avilés
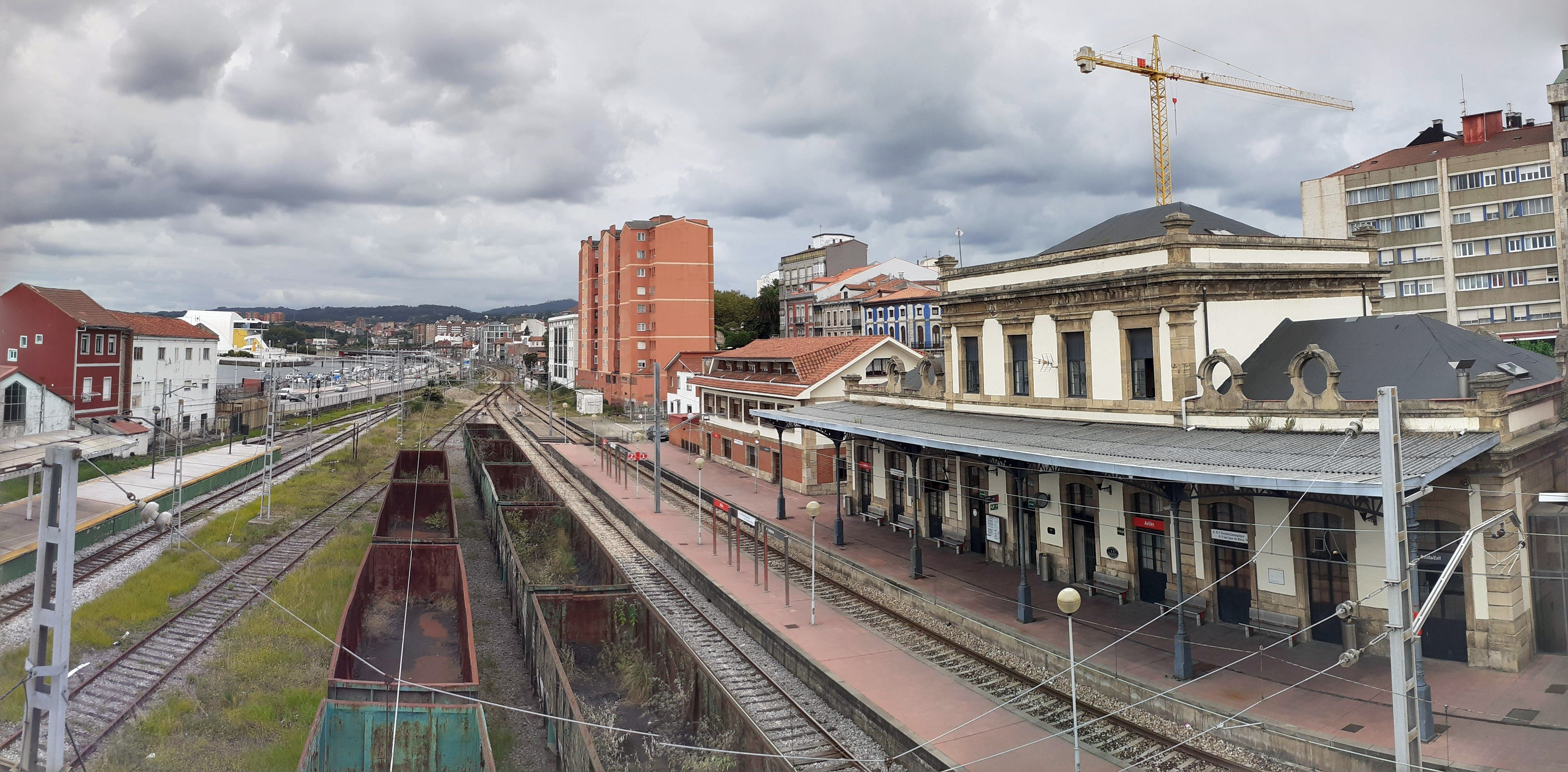
- Avilés Station Building and Platforms (2019)

General information
- Location: Avilés; Asturias; Spain
- Coordinates: 43°33′44″N 5°55′32″W
- Operator
- Transit authority: Adif
- Platforms: 2
- Tracks: 7
- Connections: Bus terminal

Construction
- Structure type: At-grade
- Parking: yes
- Accessible: yes

Other information
- Station code: 16403
- Fare zone: 3
- Website: adif.es/w/16403-avilés

History
- Opened: 26 July 1890
- Pre-nationalisation: Norte and Carreño
Services
Preceding station	Cercanías Asturias	Following station
La Rocica towards Llamaquique	C-3 (Cercanías Asturias) Civis	Terminus
La Rocica towards Llamaquique	C-3 (Cercanías Asturias) Local	San Xuan Terminus
Cristalería towards Cudillero	C-4 (Cercanías Asturias)	Avilés apeadero towards Gijón
Preceding station	Renfe Operadora	Following station
Oviedo towards Madrid Chamartín	Alvia	Terminus
Location

Avilés station is the main station in Avilés, Asturias, Spain. It is owned by Adif and operated by Renfe.

== Services ==
This station is served by C-3 and C-4 Cercanías Asturias lines. Additionally, there is a daily Alvia service towards Madrid.

== History ==
Aviles Station was opened in 1890, just 20 days after works on the railway connection between Villabona and San Xuan were completed by Norte. In 1922, Ferrocarriles de Carreño took advange of the location of this station to extend its narrow-gauge line, thus connecting Avilés with Gijón via Aboño. In 1941, the new Francoist regime nationalised all the Iberian gauge railways in Spain and Norte's assets into the newly formed Renfe. In 1972, the ownership the narrow-gauge section was transferred to FEVE, a government-owned company established with the objective of operating all narrow-gauge railway lines within Spain. In 2005, Adif became the owner of the infrastructure and the management of railway lines that were part of RENFE, which became a mere operator. In a similar move, Adif took over the narrow-gauge section of this station in 2013 with the integration of Feve in Renfe and Adif.
