= Coḷḷanzo railway station =

Railway station in Aller, Spain

Coḷḷanzo
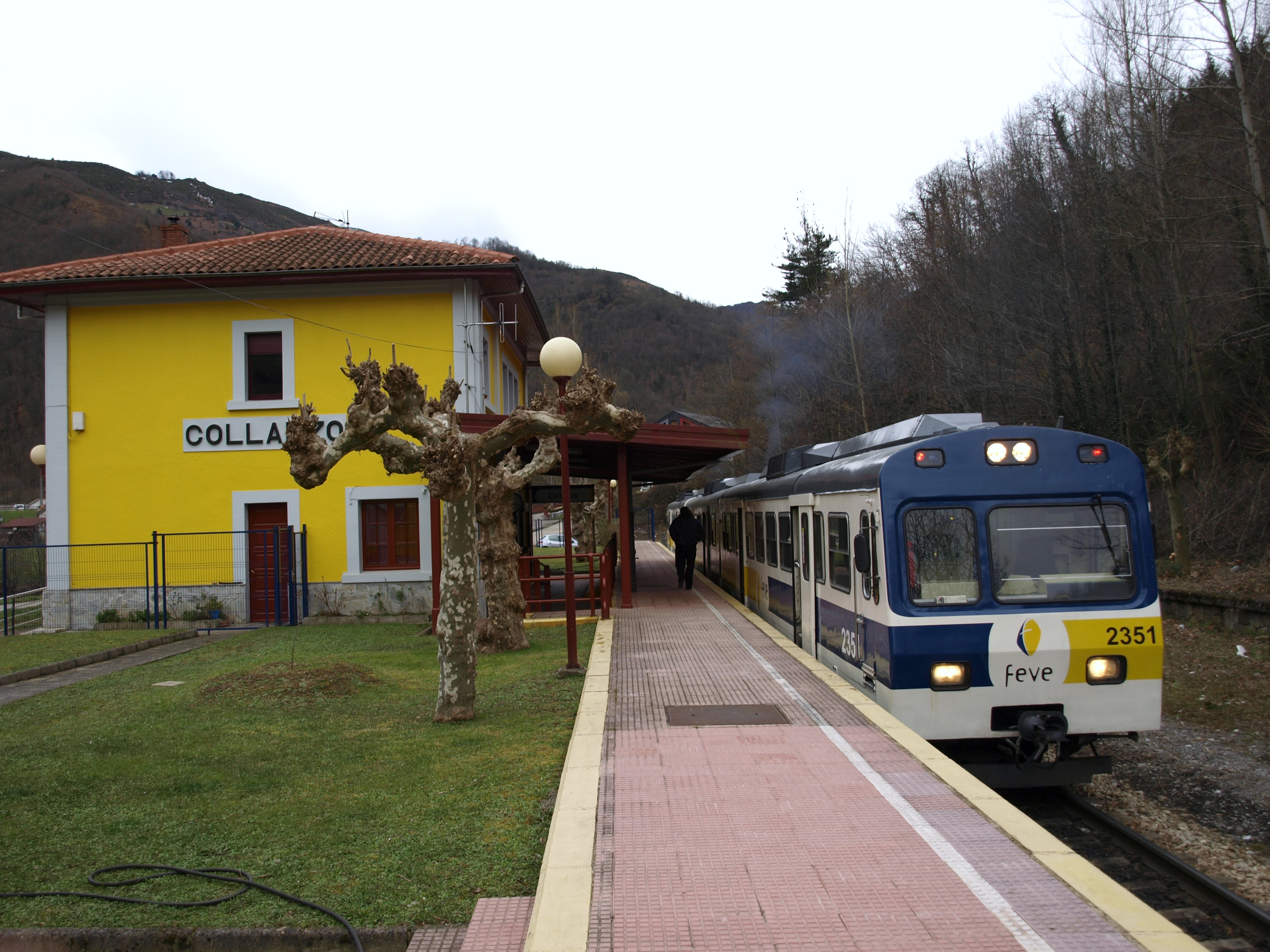
- Coḷḷanzo Station Building

General information
- Location: Aller; Asturias; Spain
- Coordinates: 43°07′26″N 5°33′58″W
- Operator
- Transit authority: Adif
- Platforms: 1
- Tracks: 1

Construction
- Structure type: At-grade
- Accessible: yes

Other information
- Station code: 05389
- Fare zone: 3
- Website: www.adif.es/w/05389-collanzo

History
- Opened: 27 January 1935
- Pre-nationalisation: Vasco
Services
Preceding station	Cercanías Asturias	Following station
Terminus	C-8 (Cercanías Asturias)	Ḷḷevinco towards Baiña
Location

Coḷḷanzo station is a railway station in Aller, Asturias, Spain. It is owned by Adif and operated by Renfe.

== Services ==
This station is served by C-8 Cercanías Asturias line.

== Station layout ==
The station consists of one side platform serving a single track.

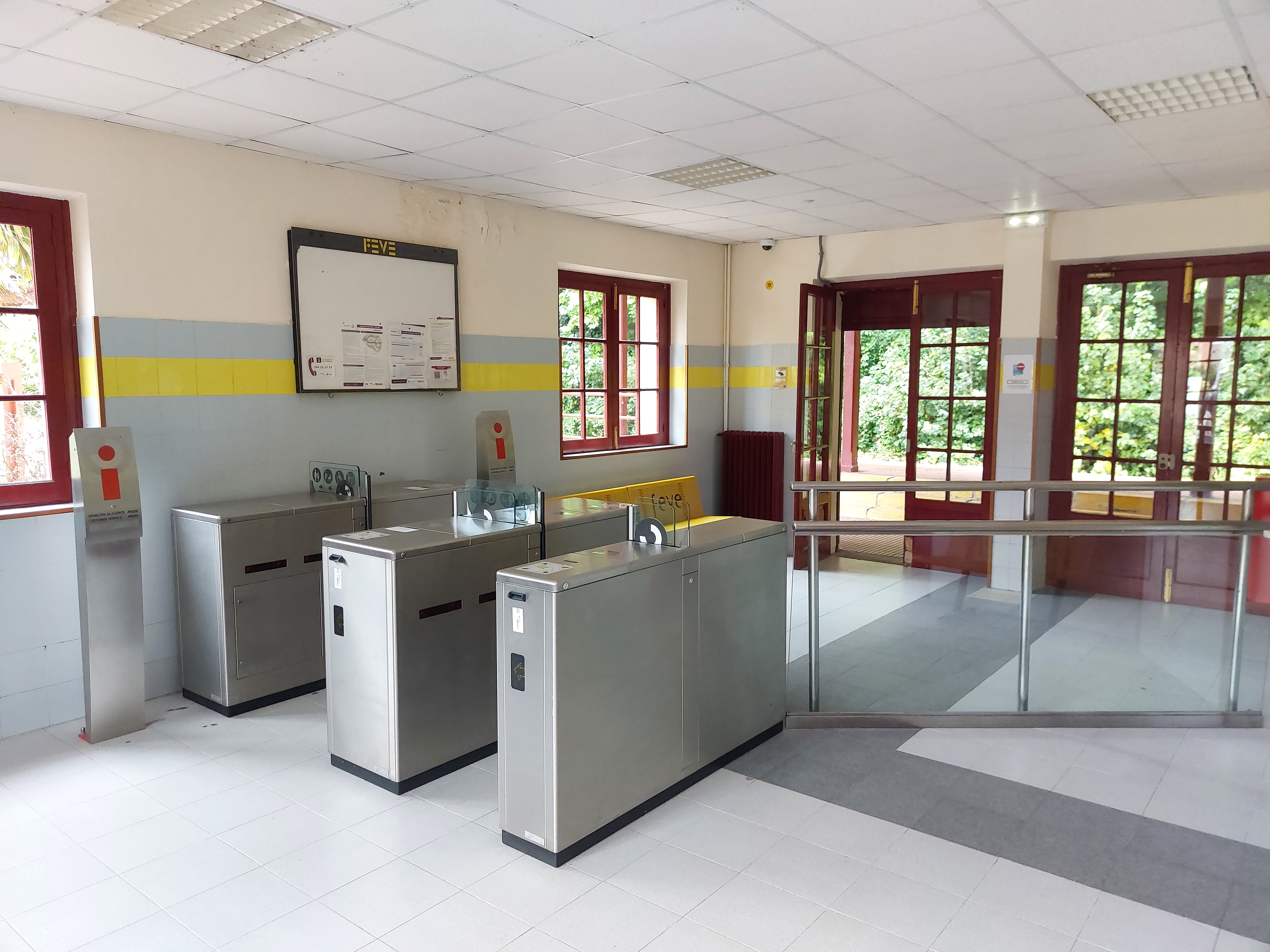
Ticket gates

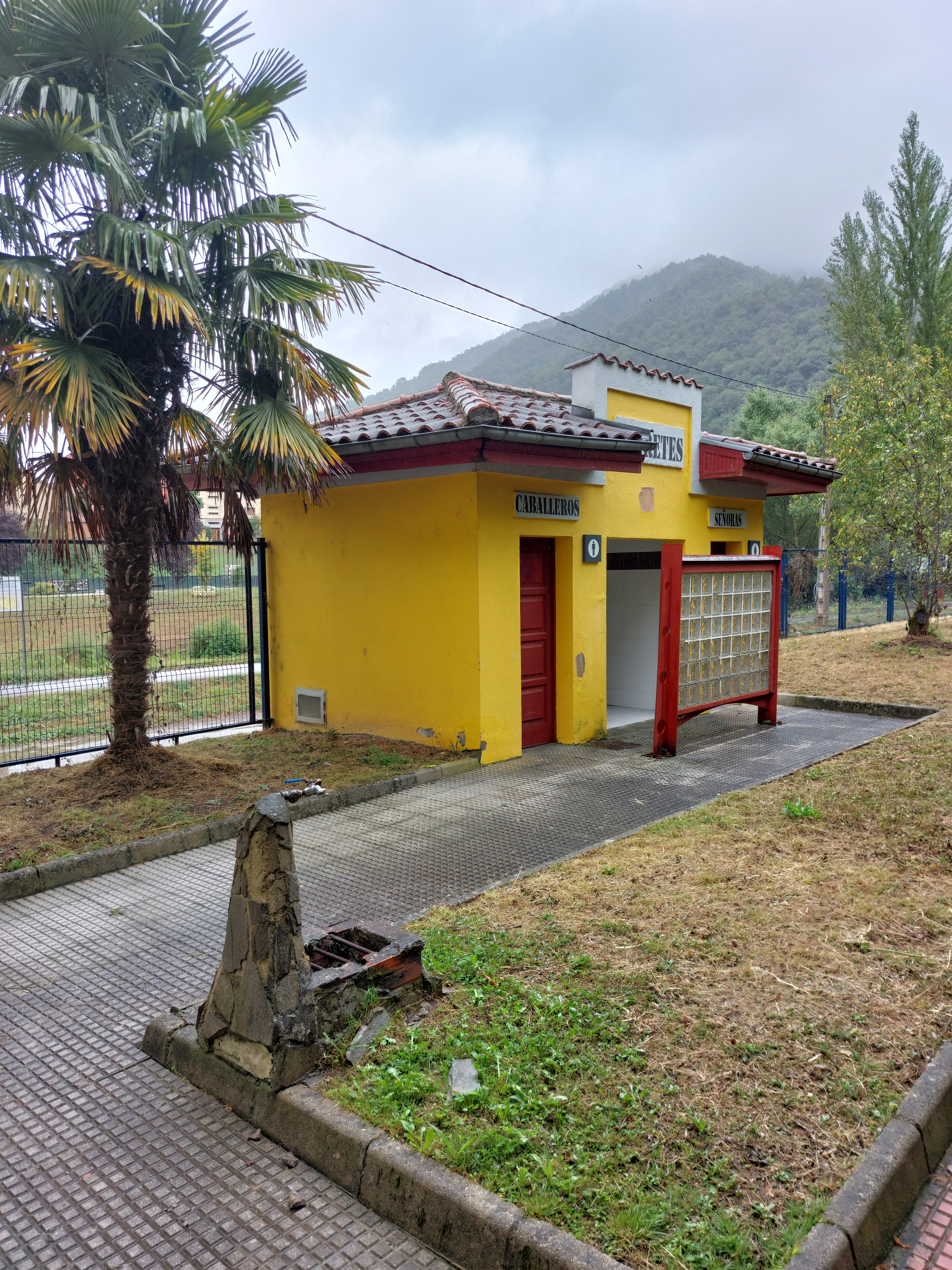
Lavatory

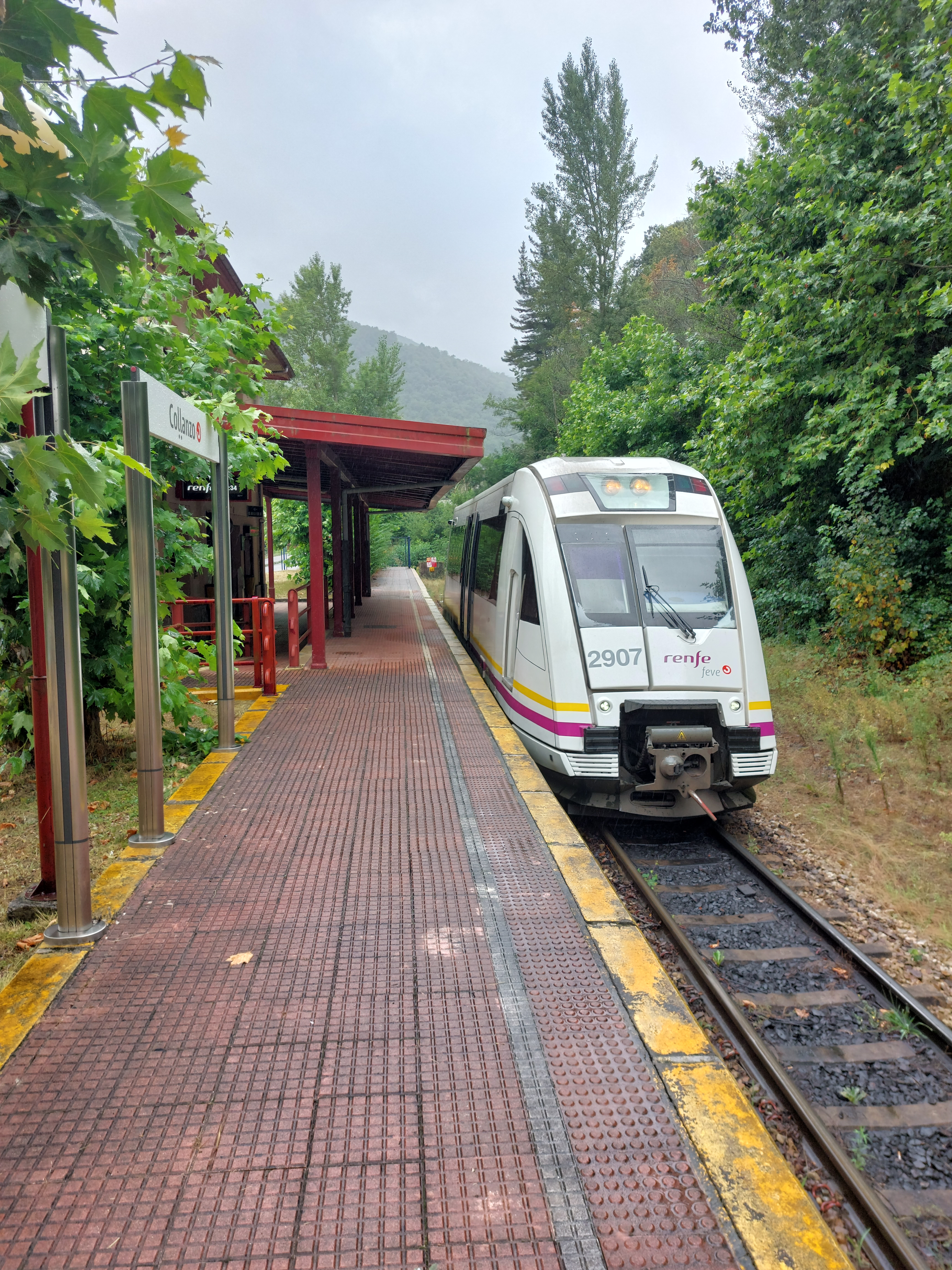
Platform and track

== History ==
Sociedad General de Ferrocarriles Vasco Asturiana had been devising an extension of its railway, opened in 1904, that transported coal to the port of San Esteban in Pravia and had reached Uxo-Taruelo by 1908. In 1925, the Spanish Government licensed an extension to Matallana de Torío in León. Its first projected section, Uxo-Taruelo-Coḷḷanzo saw its works begin in 1930, being Coḷḷanzo Station designed by José Avelino Díaz y Fernández Omaña in 1932. As a consequence of the political turmoil that suffered Asturias due to the Asturian Revolution in 1934, the Great Depression, among other circumstances, this extension suffered several delays and would not be completed until 1935, when Coḷḷanzo Station was opened. The station was equipped with a passenger building, a canteen, a loading dock and a public lavatory. In 1967, a flooding caused the canteen to be demolished.

In the latter half of the 20th century, railway freight transport lost its economic significance, and Ferrocarril de El Vasco accumulated a considerable amount of debts. Consequently, in 1972, the ownership of this station was transferred to FEVE, a government-owned company established with the objective of operating all narrow-gauge railway lines within Spain. From that point freight transport was discontinued and this station was exclusively used for passenger transport. In 1989, this station underwent a comprehensive renewal of the rails, being the wooden crossbeams replaced.

In 2013, Adif became the owner of the infrastructure and the management of railway lines that were part of FEVE, which was integrated in Renfe.
