= Renfe Class 435 =

Electric multiple unit operated by FEVE and Euskotren

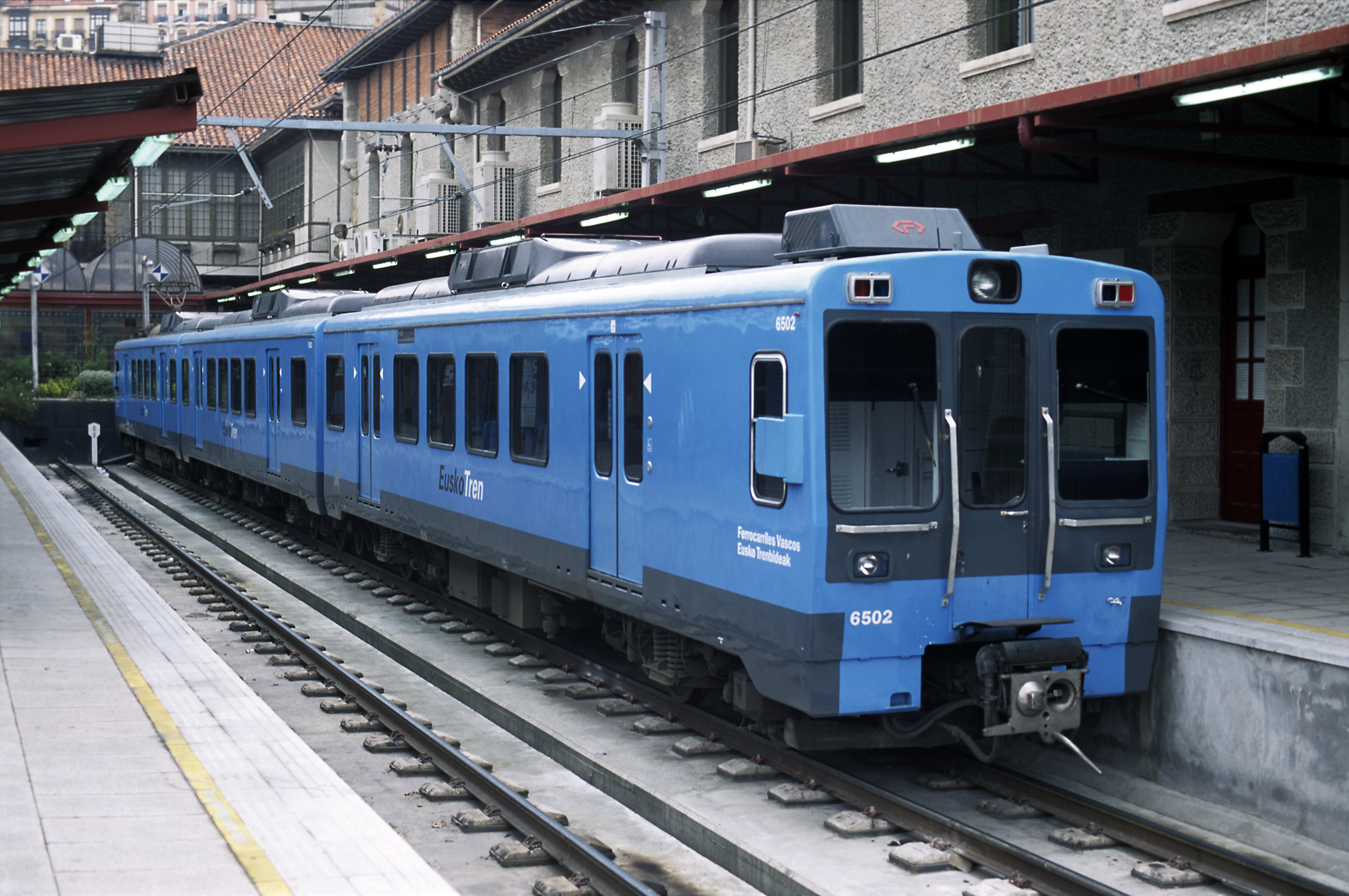
- Set 3502 in Bilbao-Atxuri, June 2004
- In service: 1977–present
- Manufacturers: CAF, AEG
- Built at: Beasain, Spain
- Constructed: 1977–1984
- Entered service: 5 May 1978
- Number built: 39
- Formation: 2, 3 and 4 cars
- Fleet numbers: 3501–3537
- Capacity: 225 (76 seated) (2 cars)
- Operators: FEVE (1978–2012); Euskotren (1982–2013); Renfe (2013–present)

Specifications
- Car length: 15.24 m (50 ft 0 in)
- Width: 2.55 m (8 ft 4 in)
- Height: 3.475 m (11 ft 4.8 in)
- Doors: 2 (per side and car)
- Maximum speed: 80 km/h (49.7 mph)
- Weight: 29,667 kg (65,405 lb) (Mc); 20,347 kg (44,857 lb) (R); 24,490 kg (53,990 lb) (Rc)
- Traction motors: 4 × GEE-TA-6788H
- Power output: 660 kW (885 hp)
- Electric system: 1,500 V DC overhead line
- Current collection: Pantograph
- UIC classification: Bo'Bo'+2'2'; Bo'Bo'+2'2'+2'2'; Bo'Bo'+2'2'+2'2'+2'2'
- Coupling system: Scharfenberg
- Track gauge: 1,000 mm (3 ft 3 3/8 in)

The Renfe Class 435 (until 2014 the FEVE 3500 series) is an electric multiple unit (EMU) train type operated by Renfe in Spain. The first units entered service in the Basque Country in 1977, these trains were later transferred to Euskotren, where they were known as the Euskotren 3500 series. Euskotren retired its last 3500 trains in 2013, but some units are still in service in Asturias.

== History ==
A total of 30 trains were ordered FEVE in 1977, half of them intended for use in the Basque Country, while the other half would be assigned to Asturias and Cantabria. The first seven trains, originally consisting of two cars, entered service on 8 May 1978 in the Bilbao–San Sebastián line. The other eight trains entered service on 1 March 1980. Already in 1978, fifteen intermediate cars were ordered for the trains in service in the Basque Country. Only the first eight cars were delivered before the narrow-gauge railways were transferred to the Basque Government, while the other seven were built in 1980. Shortly afterwards, another four intermediate cars were ordered by Basque Railways. Units 3501 and 3508 were destroyed during the 1983 floods, and were subsequently replaced by two new units with the same numbers. The remaining seven units were acquired by FEVE in 1984.

In 1988, three of the trains in service in the Basque Country (3504, 3506 and 3515) had their interior adapted for the Bidexpress, a combined passenger and mail service operating between Bilbao and San Sebastián. Two years later, the new 300 series trains entered service in the Topo line, with the 3500 series trains operating in that line being transferred to services in the Urdaibai and Bilbao–San Sebastián lines. At around the same time, the trains with four cars had one of their cars removed. The Euskotren units had their interiors reformed in the 1990s and were substantially modernized in the early 2000s. Euskotren gradually retired its 3500 units after the introduction of 900 series trains in 2011. The last train in Euskotren service made a farewell trip on 6 July 2013.

Between 2007 and 2009, twelve of the 3500 trains operated by FEVE were reengined and reformed, becoming the FEVE 3300 series. As of 2016, eight 3500 units remain in service with FEVE.

== Formations ==
Designation	Mc	(R)	Rc
Numbering	35xx	(55xx)	65xx

Originally, each trainset was formed by two cars, one of which was motored. The trains in service in the Basque Country had a third non-powered car added shortly after their introduction. In the 1980s, a fourth car was added to four of these. These four cars were numbered 5516 to 5519.

== See also ==
- Ferrocarriles de Vía Estrecha
