= San Esteban de Pravia =

Parish in Muros de Nalón, Asturias, Spain

- Parish
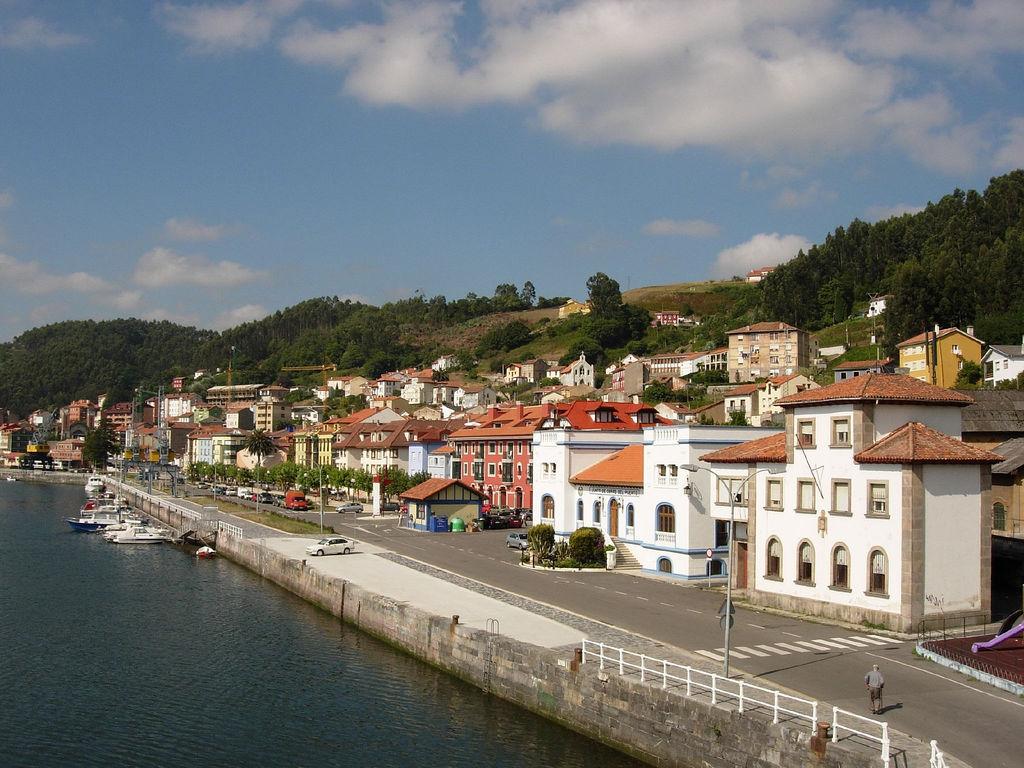
- Panorama of San Esteban de Pravia

- Location within Spain
- Coordinates: 43.5525°N 6.086944°W
- Country: Spain
- Autonomous community: Asturias
- Province: Asturias
- Municipality: Muros de Nalón

Area
  - Total: 2.31 km^{2} (0.89 sq mi)
- Elevation: 0 m (0 ft)

Population (2008)
  - Total: 657
  - Density: 284.42/km^{2} (736.6/sq mi)
- Postal code: 33130

San Esteban de Pravia is one of two parishes (administrative divisions) in Muros de Nalón, a municipality within the province and autonomous community of Asturias, in northern Spain.

== Population ==
Source: Instituto Nacional de Estadística (Spain)
