= Cercanías Asturias =

Commuter rail in Asturias, Spain

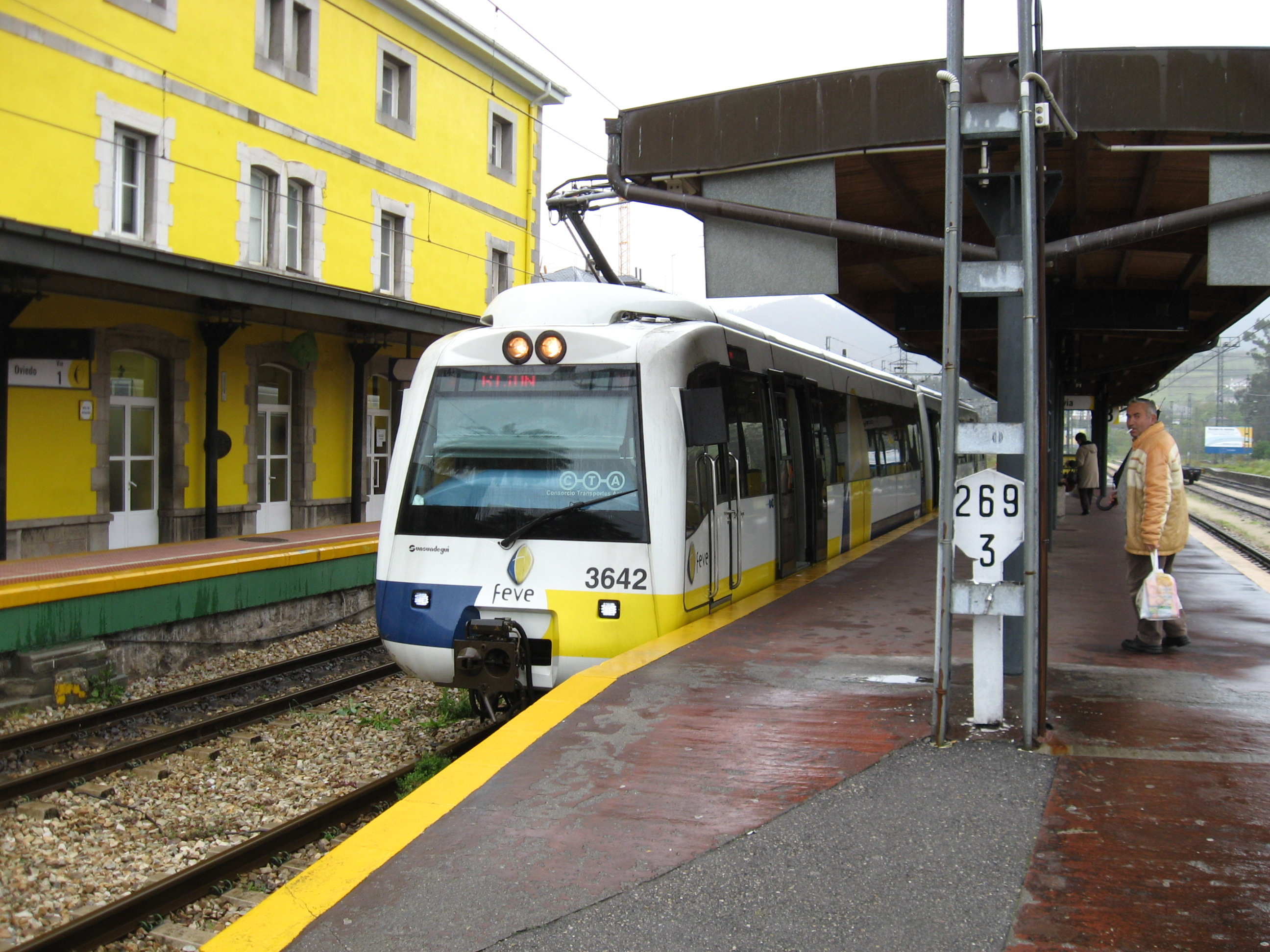

Overview
- Owner: Adif
- Locale: Asturias
- Transit type: Commuter rail
- Number of lines: 9
- Daily ridership: 28,888
- Annual ridership: 10,544,100
- Website: Website

Operation
- Operator: Renfe Operadora

Technical
- Track gauge: 1,668 mm (5 ft 5 21/32 in) (3 lines); 1,000 mm (3 ft 3 3/8 in) (6 lines)
System map

Cercanías Asturias is a commuter rail service operating in Autonomous Community of Asturias, mainly in the central area of the region.

== History ==
During the second half of the 20th century, Renfe operated several services on all the Iberian-gauge lines and circulated as suburban trains. They were popularly known as "cercanías", but Renfe did not have a specific structure for them. This changed in the 80s when the company began plans to create a defined and organised service, which was inaugurated in 1989.

At first they were divided into C-1 (Puente de los Fierros-Gijón), C-2 (Oviedo-El Entrego), C-3 (Trubia-Oviedo) and C-4 (Oviedo-Avilés) services. Nevertheless, in 1999, as part of an urbanistic project called the Green Belt, the Fuso de la Reina branch to Oviedo was closed and the former Iberian-gauge C-3 line (Oviedo-Trubia railway line) was converted into narrow-gauge.

In 2013, after the merger of Feve with Renfe, its six metric-gauge lines came to be operated by Renfe Feve (renamed as Cercanías AM in 2021). Since 2023, all nine lines were unified under Cercanías, and payments with Conecta, an Asturian fare card valid for all the means of transport under the umbrella of the Asturian Consortium of Transportation, were enabled. Since 2024, tickets can be paid by credit card.

== Lines ==
Line	Route	Stations
C-1 (Cercanías Asturias)	Puente de los Fierros – Gijón	27
C-2 (Cercanías Asturias)	Oviedo – El Entrego	13
C-3 (Cercanías Asturias)	Llamaquique – Avilés	14
C-4 (Cercanías Asturias)	Gijón – Cudillero	33
C-5 (Cercanías Asturias)	Gijón – La Pola de Llaviana/Pola de Laviana	26
C-5a (Cercanías Asturias)	Gijón – Oviedo	6
C-6 (Cercanías Asturias)	Oviedo – L'Infiestu	20
C-7 (Cercanías Asturias)	Oviedo – San Esteban	21
C-8 (Cercanías Asturias)	Baíña – Coḷḷanzo	18

== Fare system ==
Cercanías Asturias is integrated into the Asturias Consortium of Transportation Fare system, which is applied when using Conecta. Furthermore, this service has its own fare system for one-way tickets. The CONECTA system is also valid in Asturian stations outside the hub, and has its own zonal map.

Zones travelled	Fare (Conecta)	Fare (Regular)
1	€0.45	€1.65
2	€0.72	€1.95
3	€1.05	€2.65
4	€1.40	€3.30

== Usage ==
The following graph shows the number of tickets validated per year. Data for 1993 is not available. Data from 2023 on is joint.

Number of tickets validated per year (in thousands). View chart definition.

== Rolling stock ==
=== Iberian-gauge stock ===
- Civia
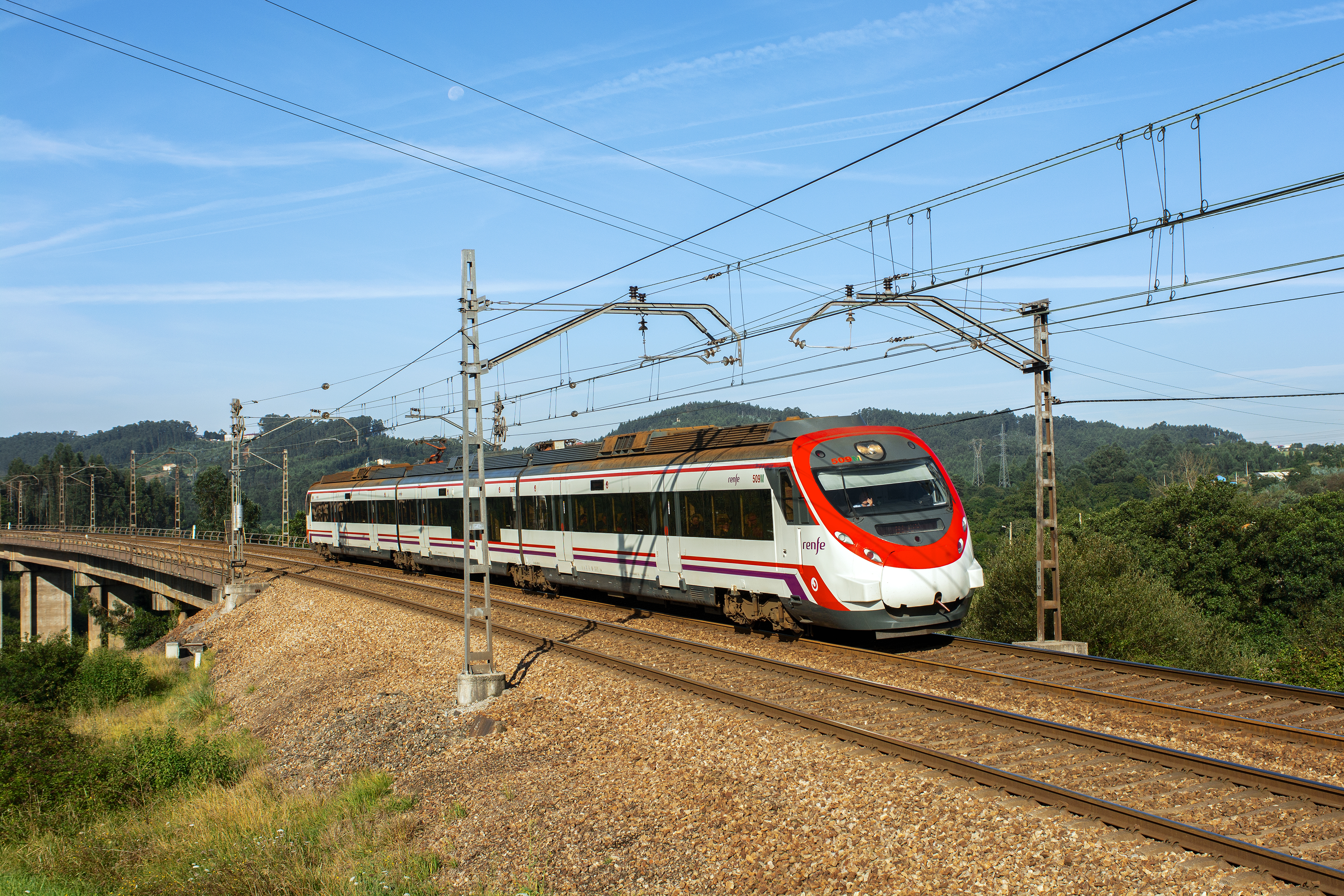
Civia (463 Series)

=== Metric-gauge stock ===
- 433 Series
- 435 Series
- 436 Series
- 527 Series
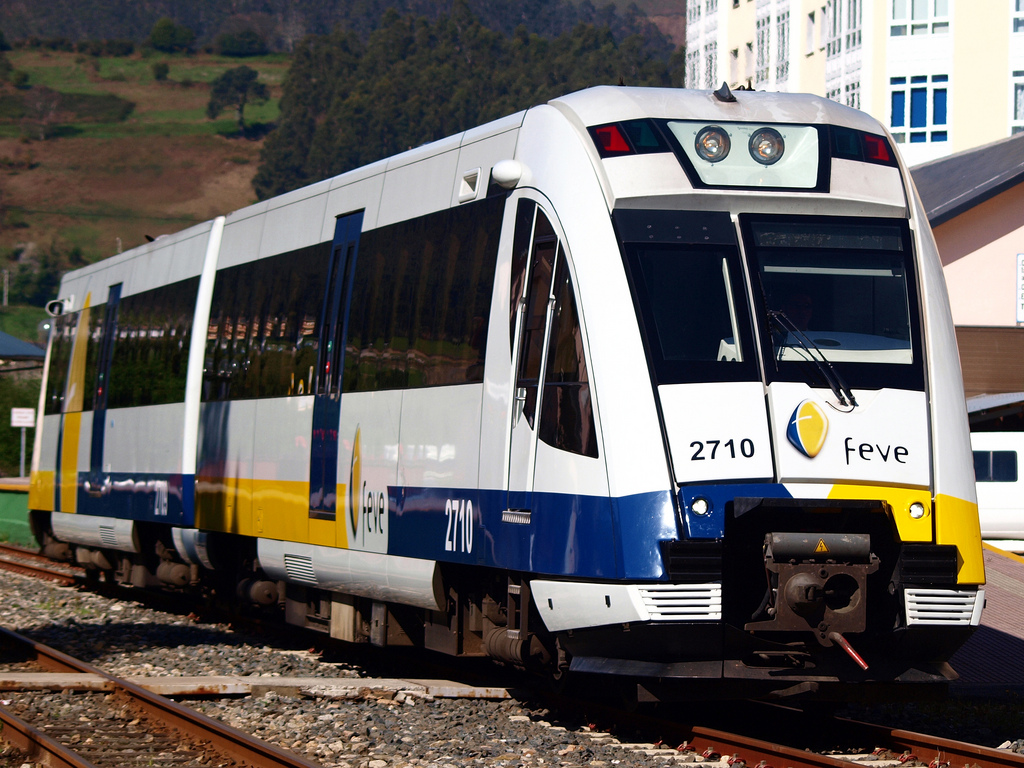
527 Series

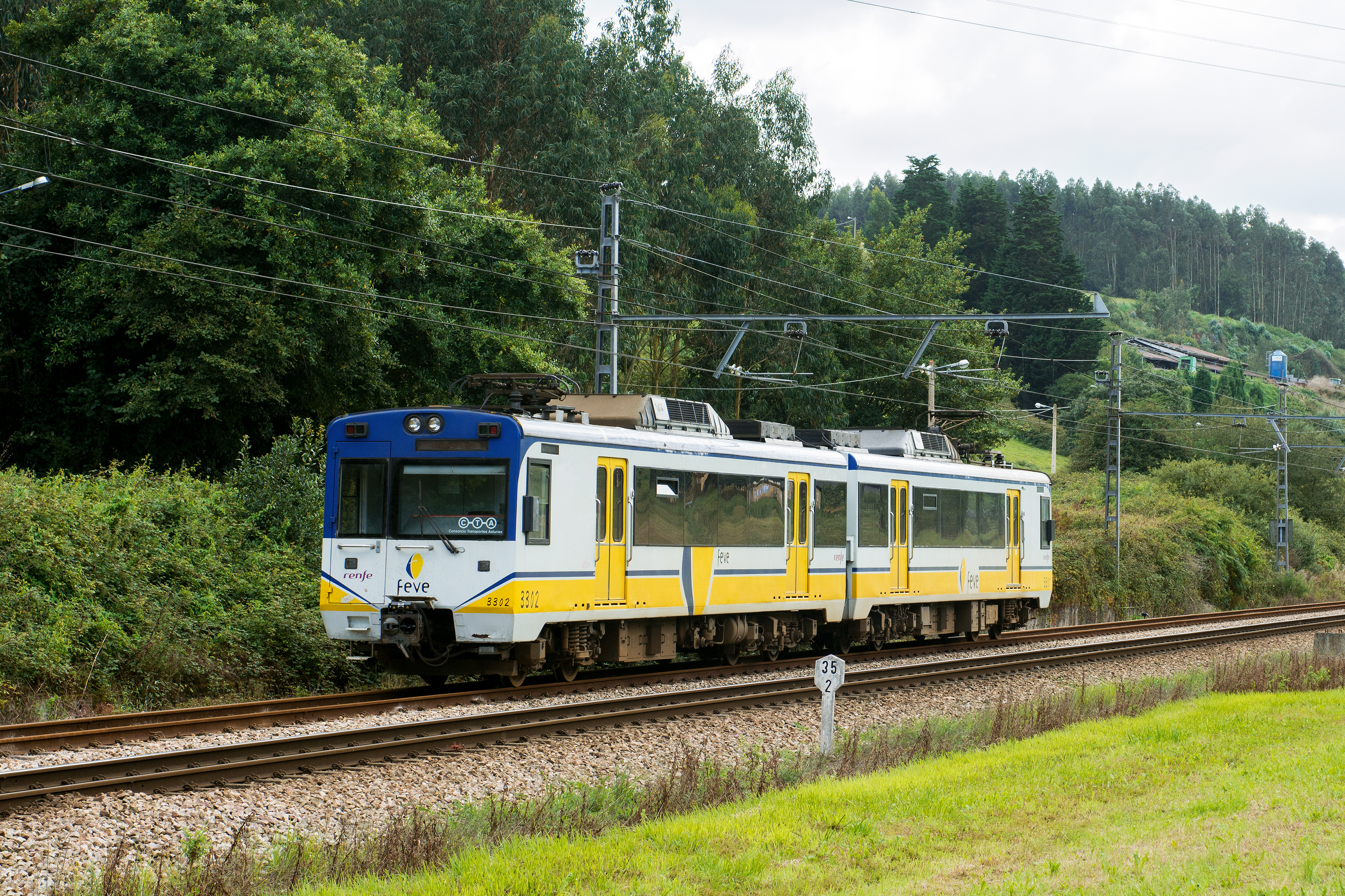
433 Series

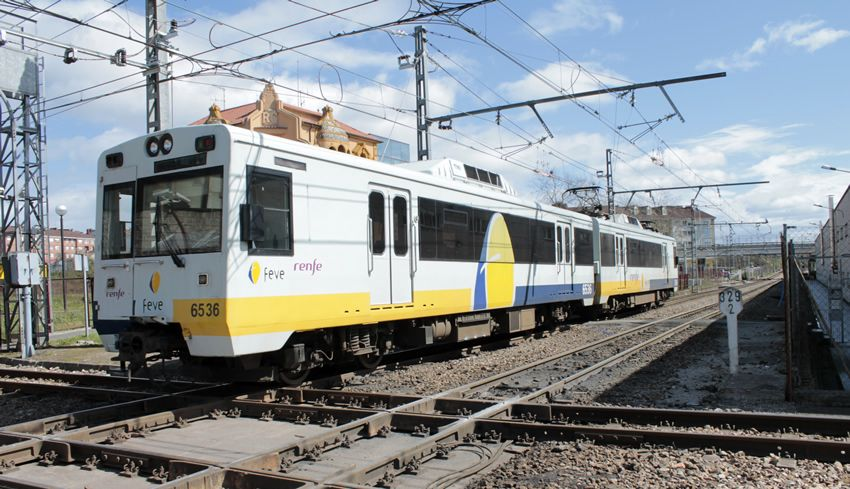
435 Series

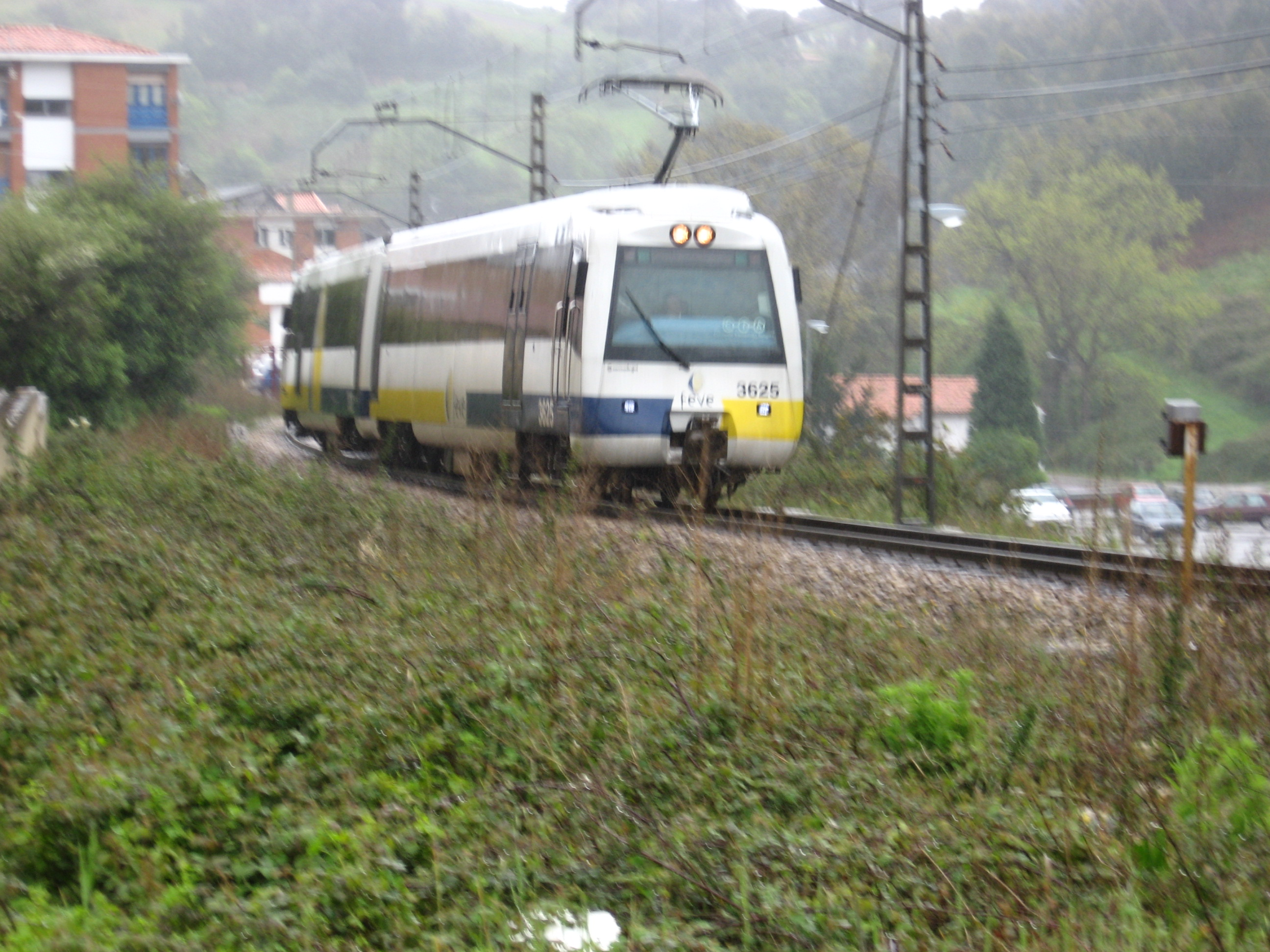
436 Series

== See also ==
- Cercanías
- Metrotrén Asturias
