= Urban planning of Miranda de Ebro =

Miranda de Ebro extends its urban layout across a vast plain located between the Ebro River valley and the Bayas River. The city's main geographical constraints for development have been the river that gives it its name and La Picota Hill. The original settlement was established at the foot of this hill and soon expanded across the river via a bridge. This led to the formation of the city's two most important districts: Aquende (on the right bank) and Allende (on the left bank). Since the plain was located on the left bank of the Ebro River, Allende became the more developed district.

In the 19th century, urban planning in Miranda de Ebro faced a new challenge: the railway system. The Madrid-Irún line cut off development to the north, while the Castejón-Bilbao line divided the city in two. These planning issues were resolved in the early 20th century with the drafting of an ensanche project that has governed the city's organization to this day, with only minor modifications.

== Urban development through history ==
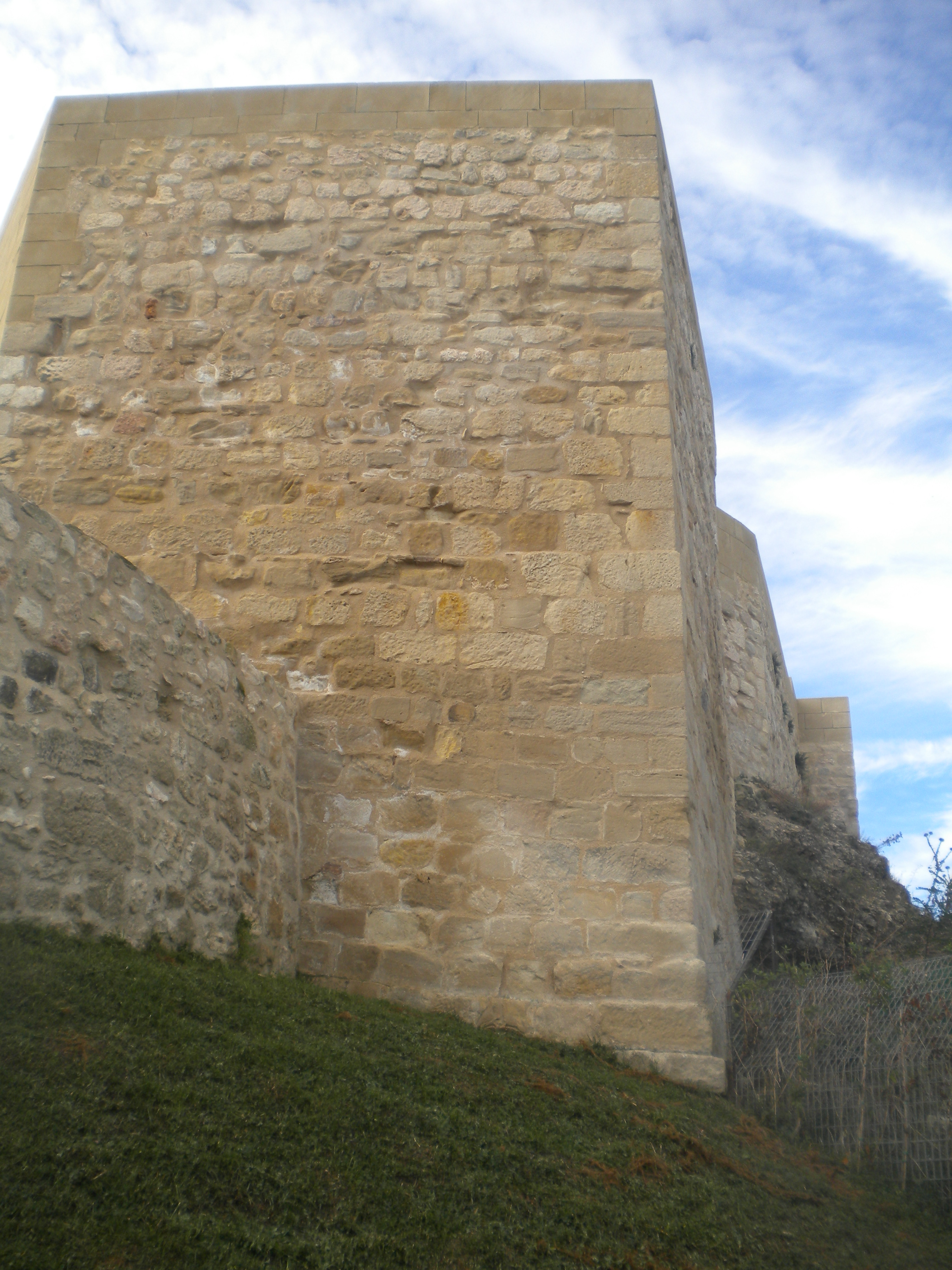
Castle of Miranda de Ebro.

=== Original settlement ===
Miranda de Ebro most likely originated atop La Picota Hill as a military outpost during the Reconquista. However, it was not founded during this conflict but rather repopulated. In 1099, Alfonso VI of Castile granted the city an important charter (fuero), by which time it had already expanded from the hill to the river, and a bridge had even been built earlier. The Fuero de Miranda also mentions the existence of the city's first two districts:

The people from Álava shall swear (their oaths) at San Nicolás near the bridge, and those from the other side of the Ebro shall do so at San Martín de Miranda, located at the top of the town.

=== Middle Ages ===
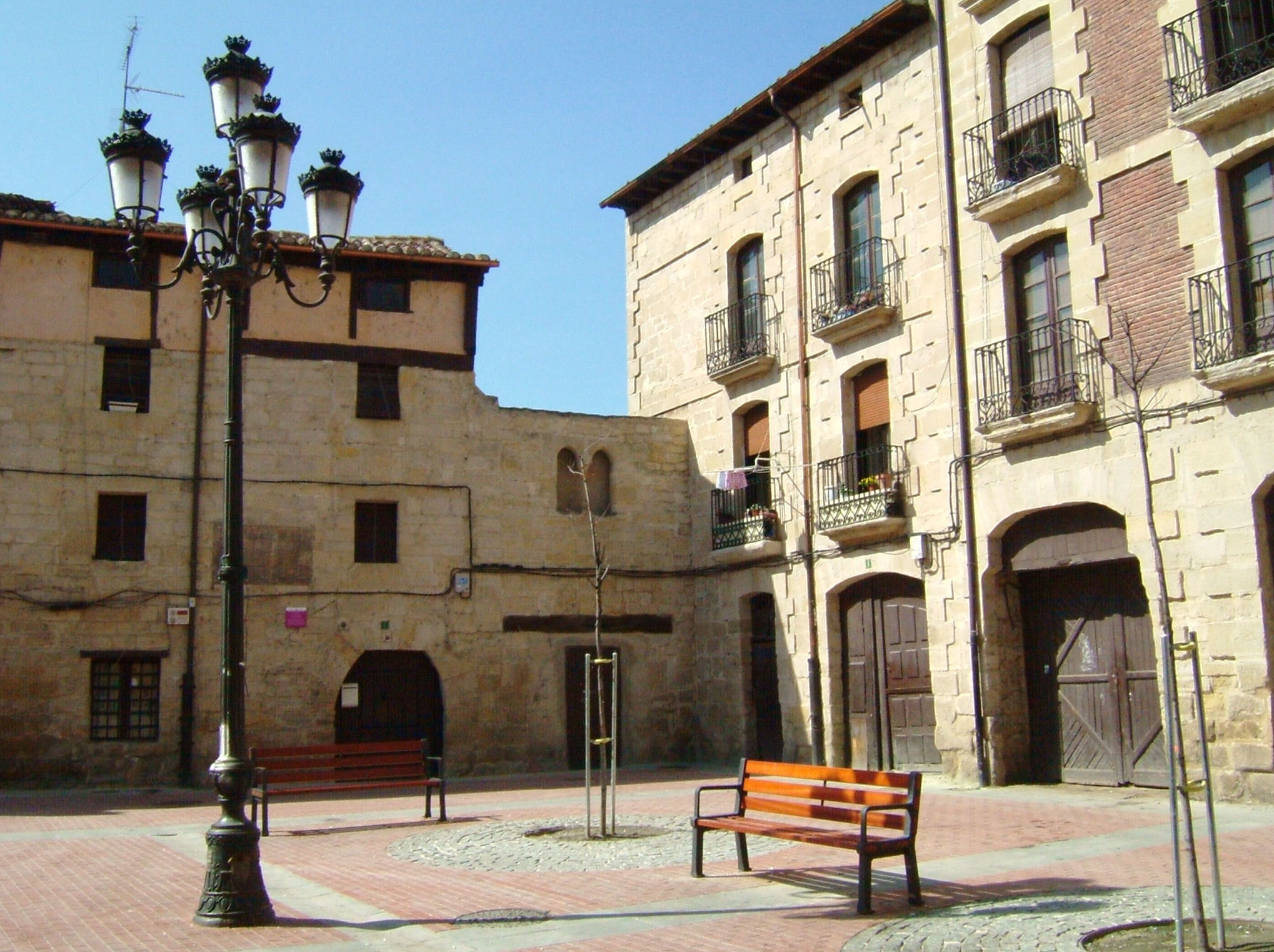
Plaza del Mercado, medieval period.

The Fuero de Miranda references two oath-taking churches: San Martín in Aquende and San Nicolás in Allende. Of these, only the latter remains today under the name of Holy Church. Other churches in Aquende included Santa María on La Picota Hill (before the construction of the castle) and Santa Petronila, both of which were destroyed by the Count of Salinas. The city's expansion led to the construction of San Juan Bautista Church in the suburbs. Next to this church, a large square was created, serving as the town’s marketplace and the location of the town council building. After the expulsion of the Jews in 1492, the council moved into the town’s former synagogue, situated near the bridge.

In 1358, Count Don Tello, Lord of Biscay, requested land from the Bishopric of Calahorra to build the Castle of Miranda de Ebro atop La Picota Hill, where the original Santa María Church stood. However, construction did not begin until 1449, when Pedro Sarmiento, Count of Salinas, took over the church.

Initially, there were two distinct settlements, each with its own church, which over time merged into a single fortified town. The city walls were fully consolidated in Aquende by the late 14th century. By 1375, there were four entrances to the city: Puente Gate, Valle Gate, Barribozó Gate, and San Juan Gate. The city was composed of narrow, unpaved streets running parallel to the Ebro River and small, cramped squares.

During the Middle Ages, the Allende district developed around the Church of the Holy Spirit and remained much smaller in size compared to Aquende.

=== Renaissance ===
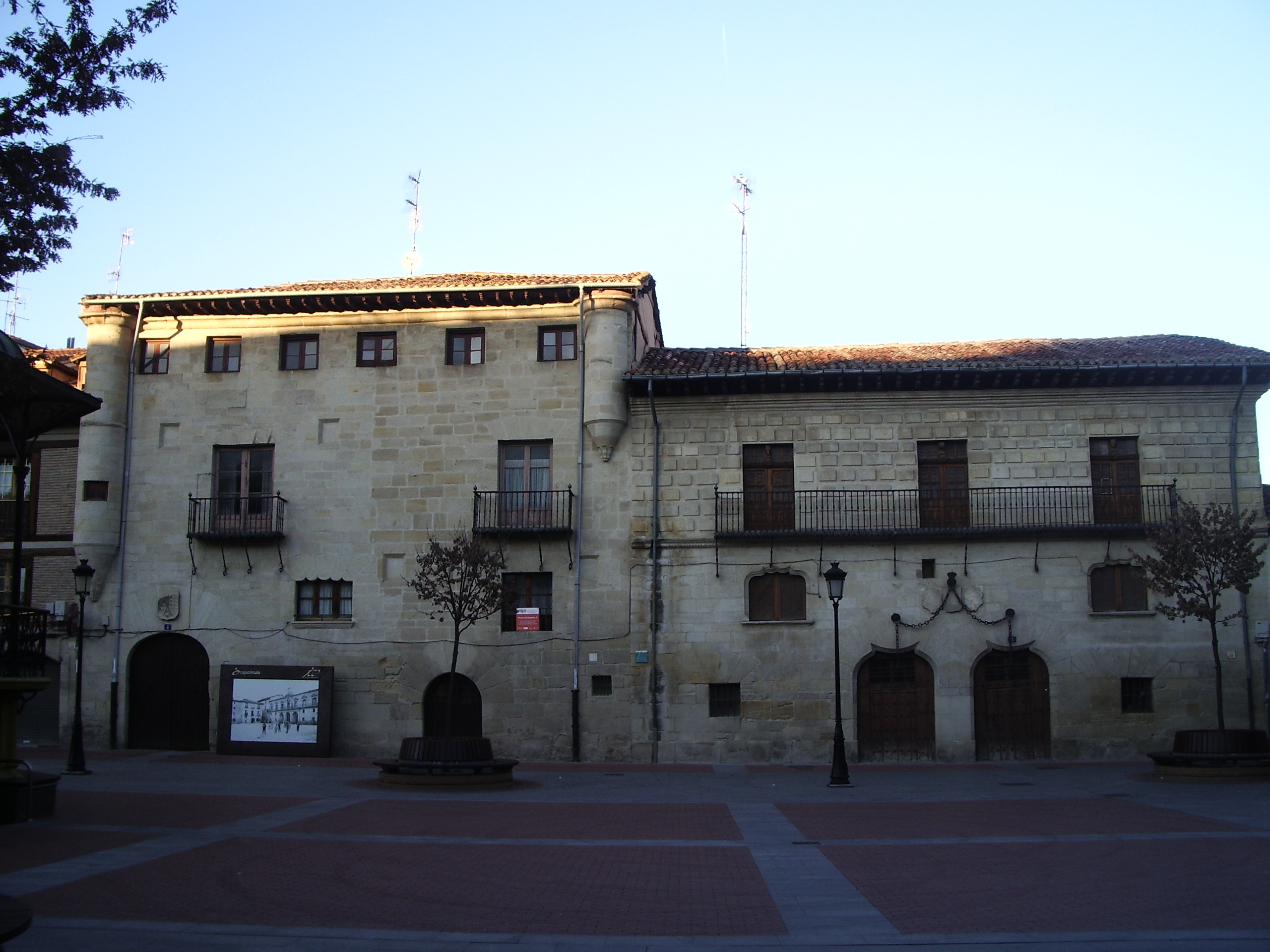
Casa de las Cadenas and Casa de los Urbina, both from the 16th century.

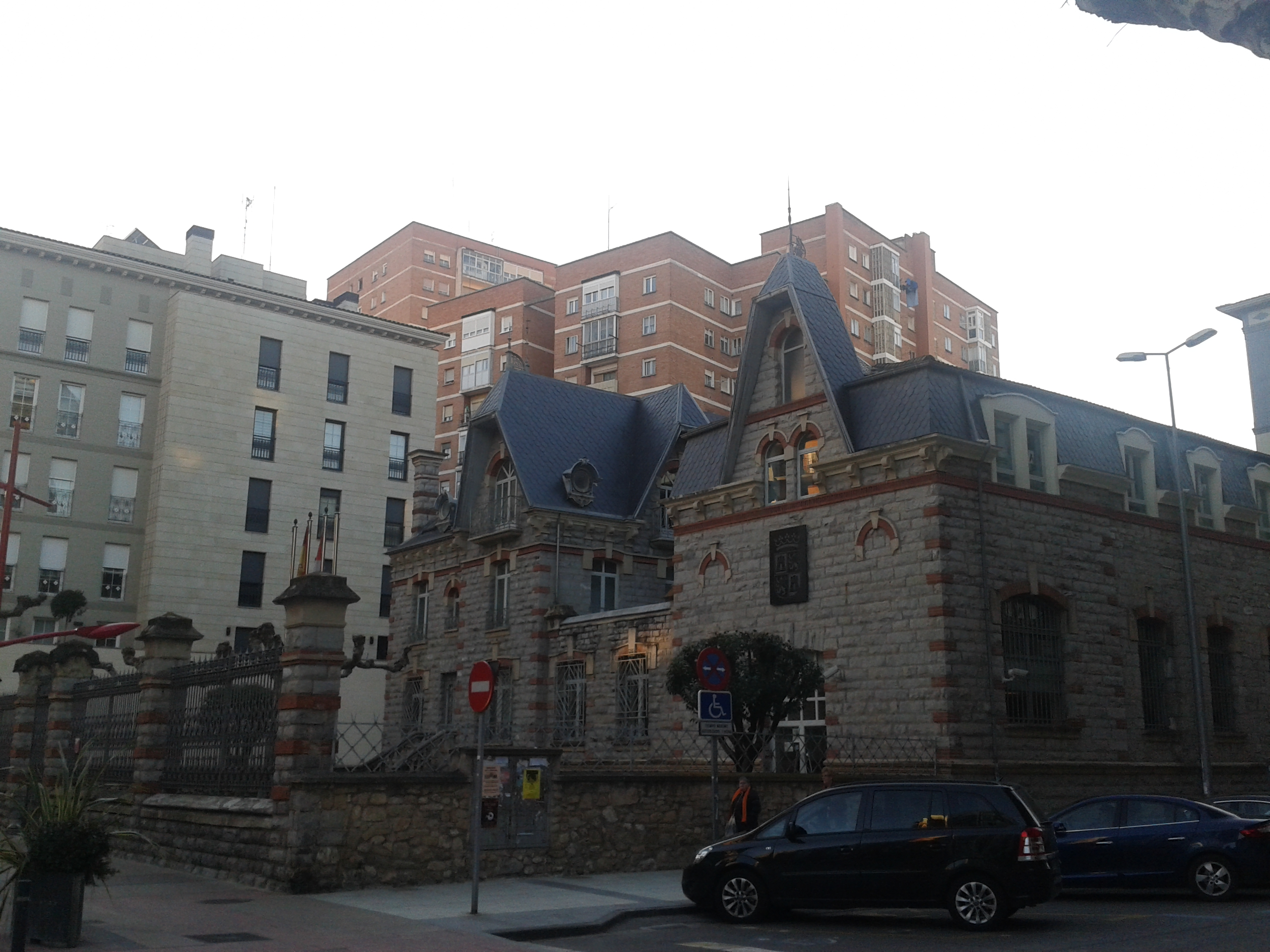
Former Augustinian monastery, now the headquarters of the Junta de Castilla y León.

The period between the 16th and 18th centuries was the most fruitful in terms of art, architecture, and urban development. The town remained walled, although there were some maintenance issues with its defenses. At the beginning of the 16th century, the construction of the Church of Santa María of Altamira began on the site previously occupied by the Chantre Hospital. The original Church of Santa María was located atop La Picota hill and exhibited a Romanesque style, but in 1449, the Count of Salinas dismantled it to begin the construction of the castle. The new temple, located in the heart of Aquende, (Note: Aquende is the name of the neighborhood located on the right bank of the Ebro River, the oldest in the city.) was built with ashlar stone in a Renaissance style. In the 1570s, construction began on the San Francisco convent (now the Convent of the Sacred Hearts).

By 1564, the town walls were consolidated, and new gates were added to the existing ones: Arenal, Santa Lucía, and San Nicolás in the Allende district.

In 1581, a tower was built on the first arch of the bridge from Aquende, housing the town hall, the courthouse, and a butcher shop. Since the 16th century, the bridge had been in a poor state. It had seven arches, a curved profile, and a narrow roadway. Later, a new tower was built on the first pier of Allende, which served as a prison. Altogether, the bridge's structures formed a true fortress over the water.

In the mid-17th century, the Plaza del Rey (now Plaza de España) was constructed. Work began in 1644, and its dimensions were initially much smaller than today. The square hosted festivities and bullfights. Surrounding the square, some of the best buildings of the era were erected: the Casa de las Cadenas (1580-1600), the Casa de los Urbina (1540), and the Town Hall (1788), which was reviewed by Ventura Rodríguez. Another notable building is the Gil Delgado-Ocio Palace (1770).

In 1684, in Allende, far from the town, the old Augustinian Convent was built along the road to France. The site had previously been occupied by the Magdalena Hermitage, which was already mentioned in historical fueros.

A devastating flood on June 19-21, 1775, swept away the bridge and other structures (including the town hall, which was housed in a synagogue near the viaduct). Miranda urgently needed a new bridge, and the town council immediately contacted the royal court to arrange for its construction. The chosen architect was Francisco Alejo de Aranguren from La Rioja. Construction began that same year, slightly upstream from the old bridge, and was completed in record time: by 1777, the bridge was ready, though it was not officially inaugurated until 1780. At the entrance to Allende, two lion sculptures by the Basque artist Juan Antonio de Moraza were placed in 1787. One lion holds the royal coat of arms, while the other holds the city's emblem. It is believed that a pair of stone vases once adorned the Aquende entrance. The bridge was named after King Charles III.

Ultimately, the town followed the classic model of elongated and narrow streets. The average height of the buildings was three or four stories, including the ground floor. The use of stone was almost exclusively limited to the ground floors and facades.

The 19th century was of vital importance because, in the 1860s, the arrival of the railway significantly influenced urban planning. The Peninsular War left the city in a deteriorated state, leading to the demolition of the city wall's gates, whose stones were repurposed for the reconstruction of other buildings, notably the cemetery. On February 20, 1815, the demolition of the San Joseph gate was approved, followed by the San Juan and San Francisco gates on March 13 of the same year.

=== Expansion plan of Keller ===
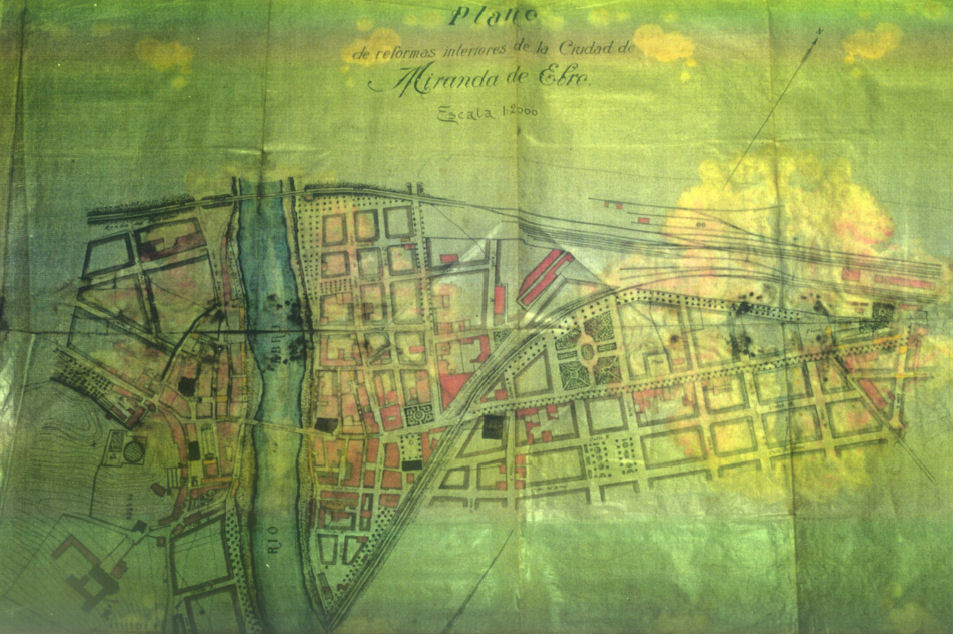
Federico Keller's Plan for the Reform and Expansion (1903).

Since 1903, Miranda de Ebro followed an expansion plan designed by Federico Keller, organizing the streets in an orthogonal grid, similar to the plan devised by Ildefons Cerdá for Barcelona. To break monotony, Keller incorporated circular plazas and gathering points for the population. The proposed grid consisted of rectangular blocks, and in streets narrower than 12 meters, the corners were designed with chamfered or rounded edges. In 1912, the town council increased the municipal budget to over 100,000 pesetas, an unprecedented figure, which rose to 200,000 pesetas by 1915. This budget increase was reflected in new infrastructure: public sewer systems, street paving, a slaughterhouse, a central park, a grain exchange, and many other improvements that made Miranda a well-equipped city.

In 1908, a bullring with a capacity of 5,000 spectators was inaugurated, built using stones from the dismantled city castle. Another entertainment venue from this period was the Apolo Theater, which opened on October 4, 1921. The first play performed was El genio alegre (The merry genius) by the Álvarez Quintero brothers. The following year, the Novedades cinema was inaugurated.

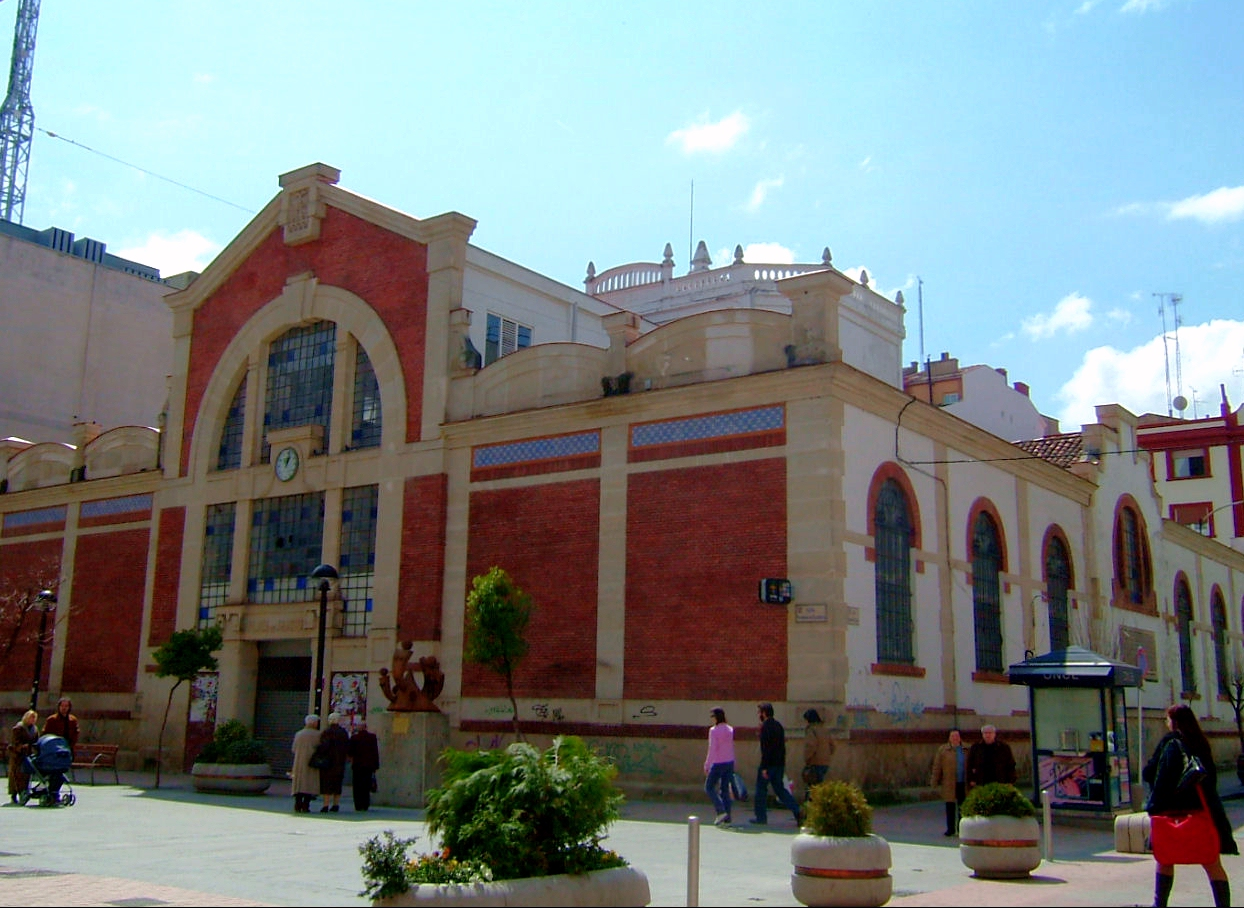
Plaza de Abastos [Market Hall] (1917).

Although population growth during the Second Republic was not as intense, the city continued to develop. During this period, Miranda acquired a Rural Hygiene Center, a Technical Secondary School, the Market Hall, a post office, a Court of First Instance, and other facilities. These improvements, alongside industrial growth, made Miranda a key economic hub in the region and an attractive destination for rural workers seeking employment.

In the second half of the 20th century, urban planning was guided by formal regulations. In 1962, the town council approved the drafting of the first General Urban Development Plan, which came into full effect in 1968. In 1977, the Special Interior Reform Plan for the Allende District was implemented, followed in 1983 by the Interior Reform Plan for the Aquende District. The most recent General Urban Development Plan was approved in 2005.

The last quarter of the 20th century in Miranda de Ebro was marked by the rerouting of the Castejón-Bilbao railway line, which had divided the city for over a century. The last train passed through the city center in 1987, and in its place, a modern avenue called Ronda del Ferrocarril was built. The new railway route now runs through a tunnel excavated in La Picota hill. During this period, public infrastructure was significantly improved, with the construction of a sports complex, the Municipal Cultural Center, and other facilities.

=== Industrialization ===
During the second half of the 20th century, the city experienced an industrial boom with the arrival of companies such as FEFASA. Notable architectural landmarks from this period include the Fray Pedro de Urbina Secondary School, the Church of San Nicolás de Bari, and the Church of Nuestra Señora de Los Ángeles, which was built in a garden-city-style development constructed by FEFASA to house its paper factory workers.

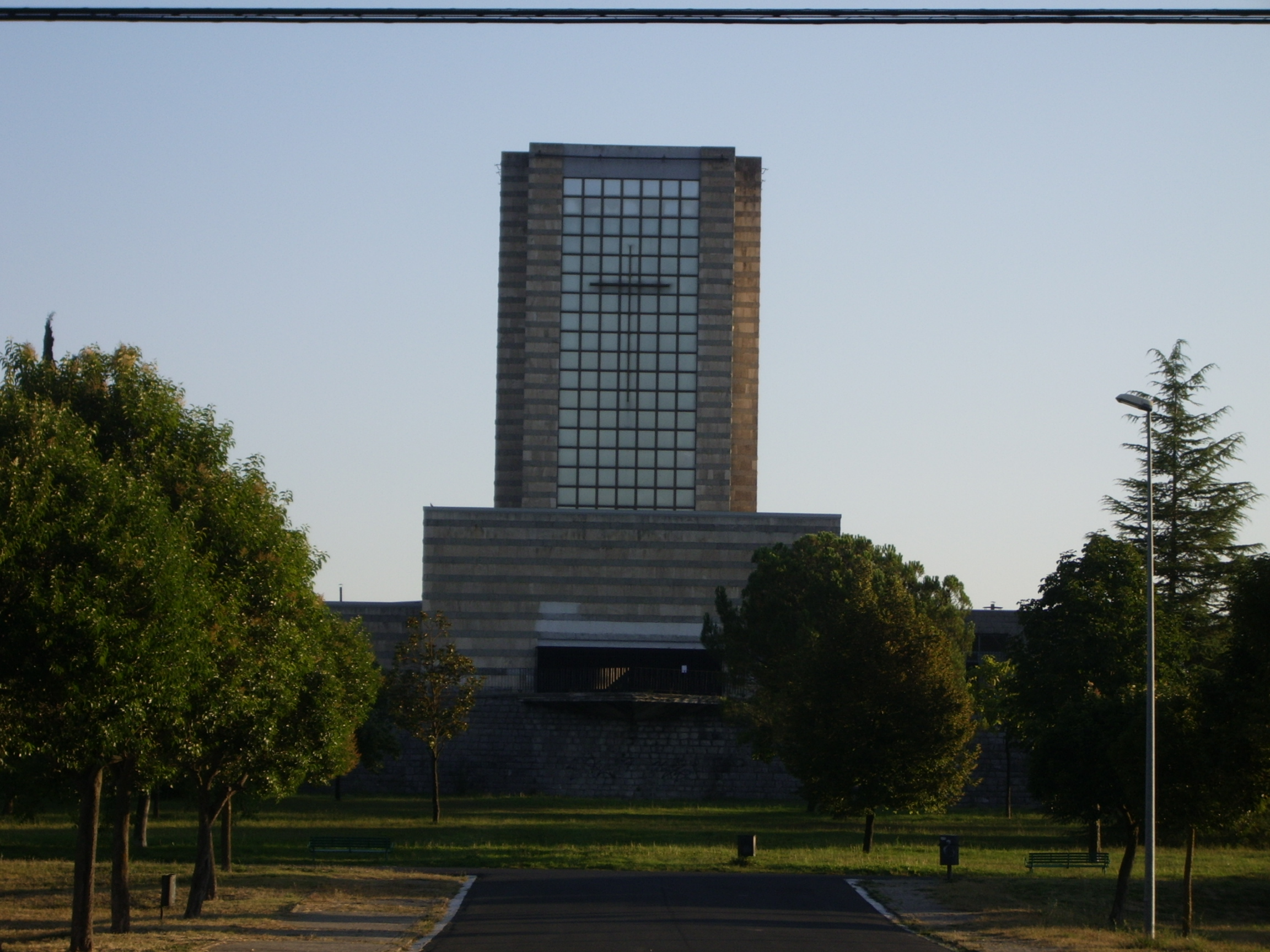
Church of Nuestra Señora de Los Ángeles

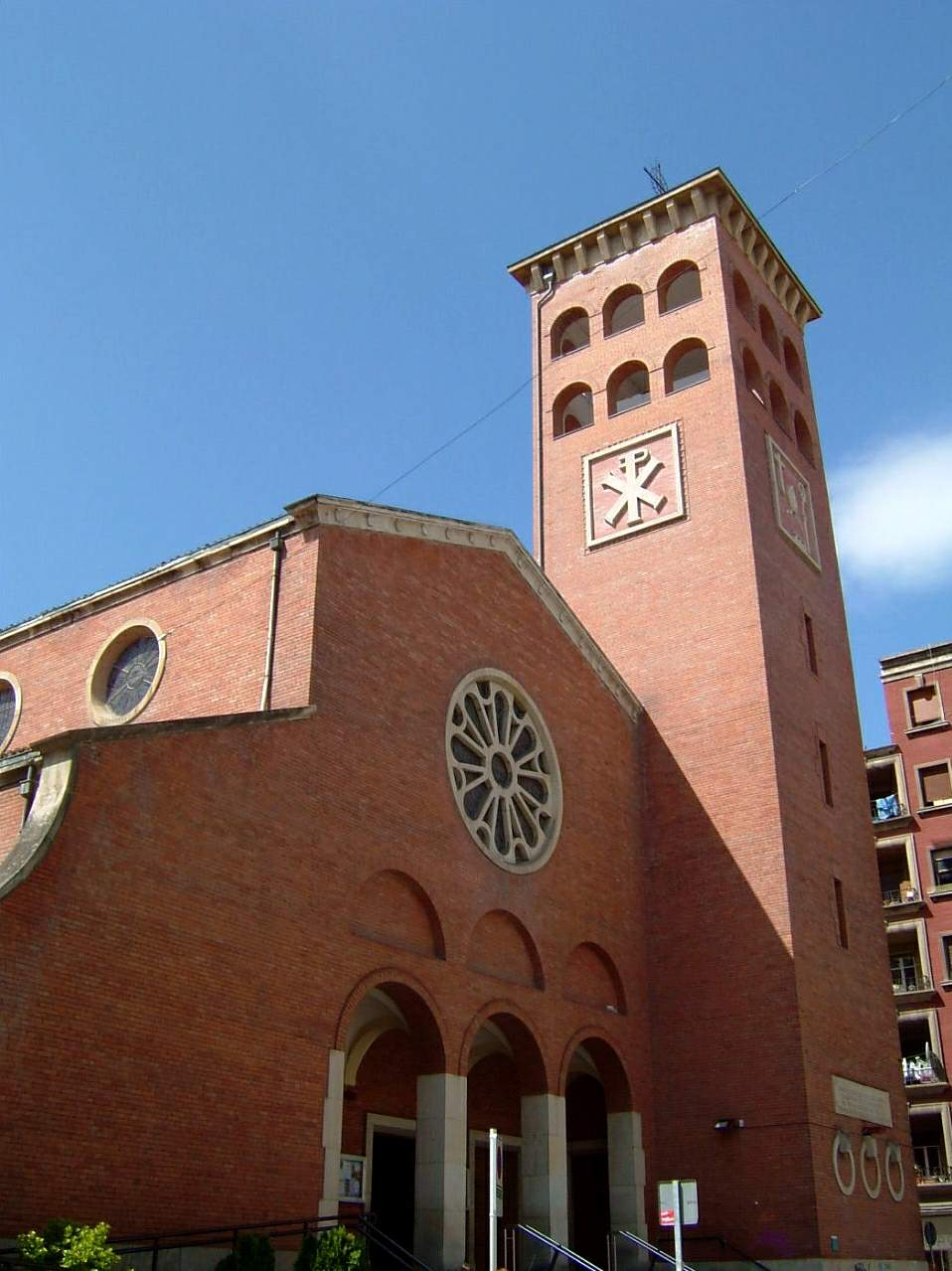
Church of San Nicolás de Bari

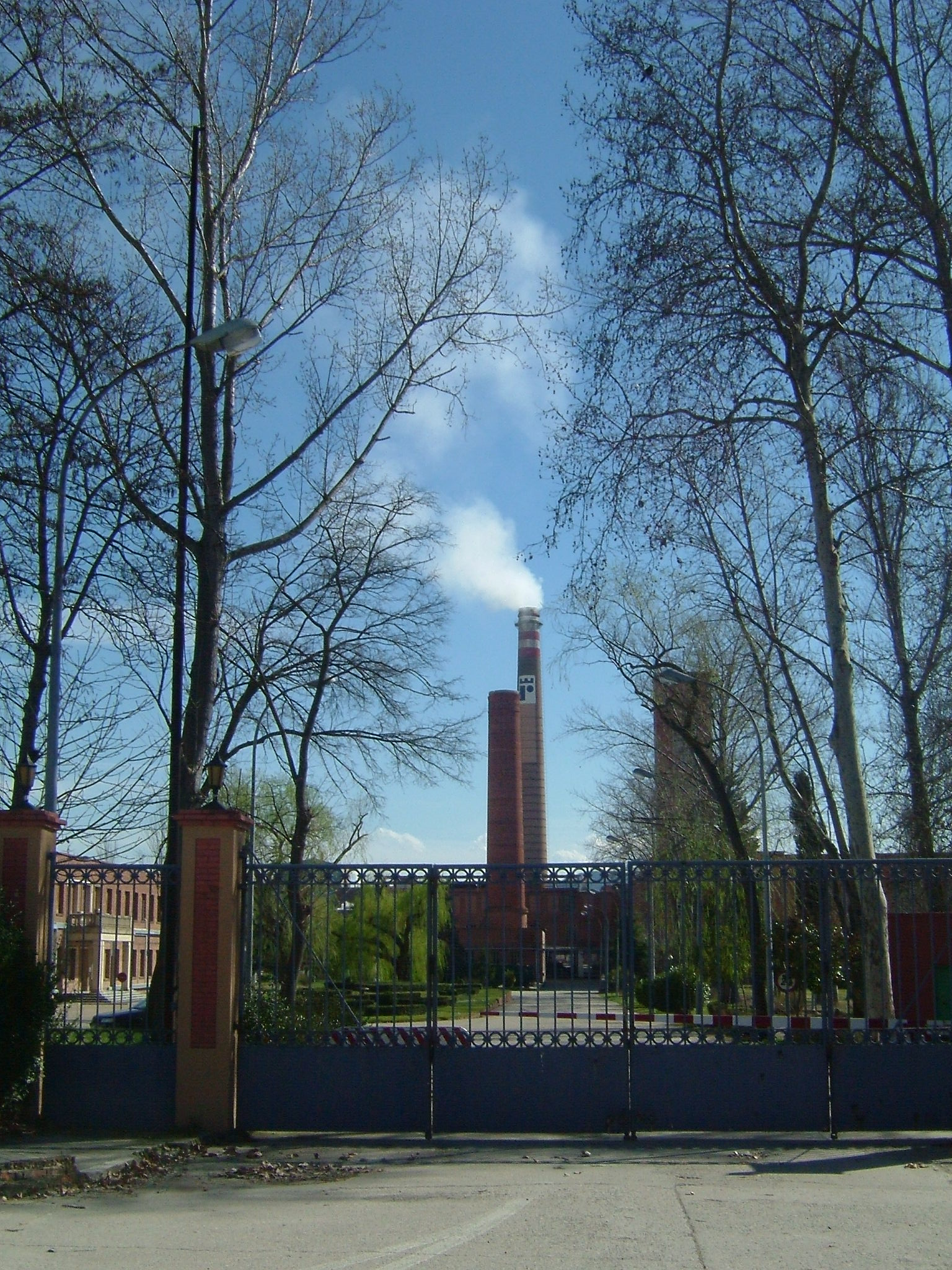
Old Paper Factory

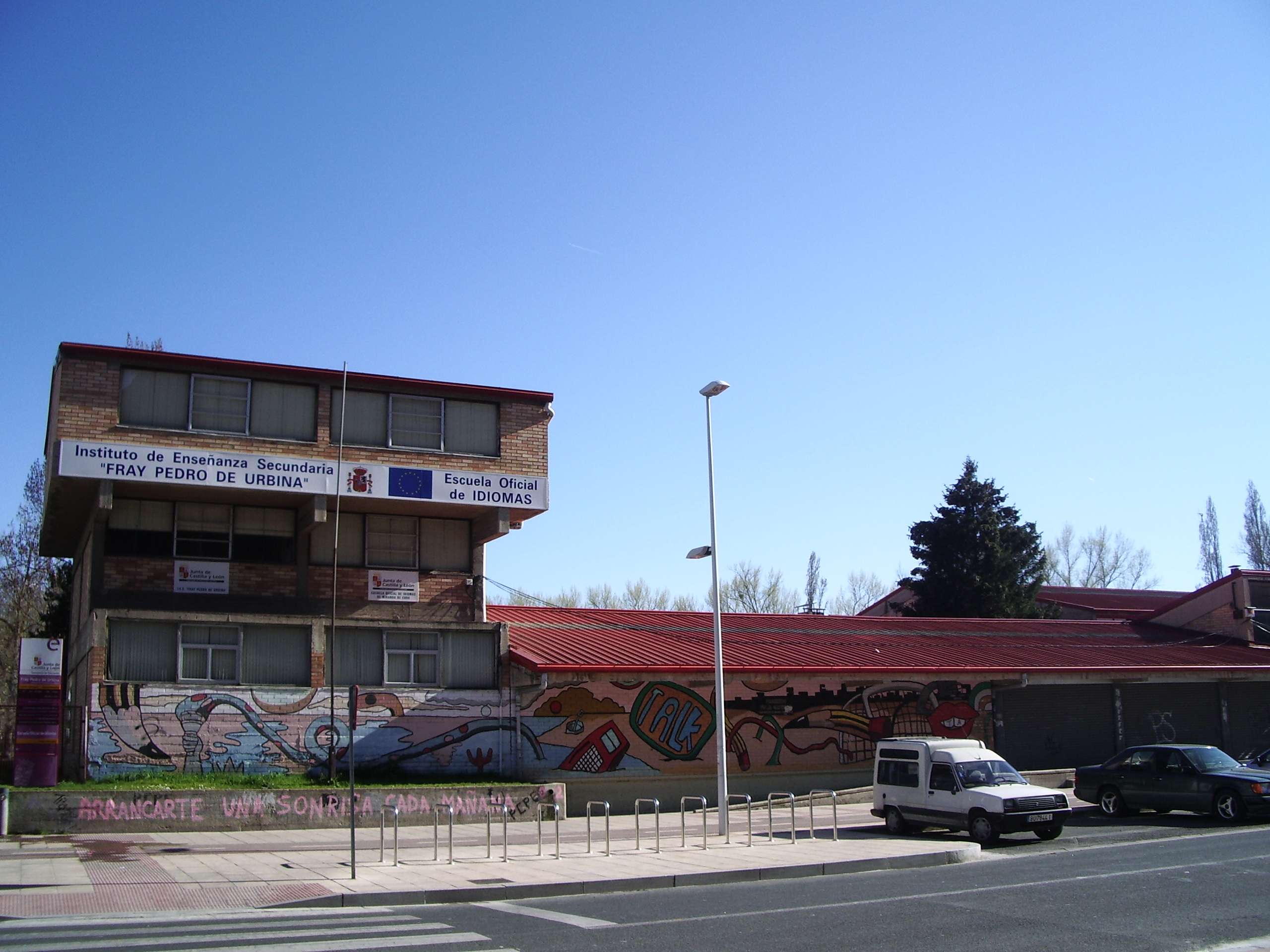
Fray Pedro de Urbina Secondary School

=== Urban projects ===
Unlike the traditional expansion of Miranda de Ebro in the 20th century, recent urban developments have included numerous public squares, parks, green spaces, and various facilities. Additionally, significant changes were made in the city center by pedestrianizing parts of the main avenues in the expansion area.

One of the key urban projects of the 21st century is the creation of the city's first museum, whose construction was set to begin in 2009. This museum will dynamically showcase Miranda's history and house the city's historical archives. It will be located in the Casa de Don Lope (House of Don Lope), an 18th-century neoclassical mansion, to which a modern red-colored building will be added as a visual landmark along the Ebro River. Another significant project is the Hangar of Arts or Hangar of Young Art, planned for construction starting in September 2008. This center aims to become a national hub for visual arts, offering young talents a space to develop their artistic skills. Additionally, it will serve as the headquarters of the Fundación Arte Joven de Castilla y León.

The expansion of industrial land in Miranda de Ebro is also crucial for the city's economic growth. In 2010, a new industrial area, the Ircio Business Park, was inaugurated, becoming one of the largest in Castilla y León.

=== Historical accounts ===
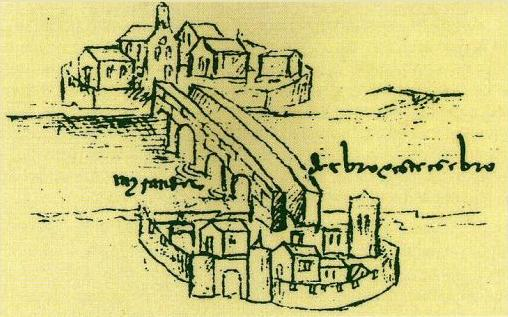
Representation of the town and fortress of Miranda between 1487 and 1497

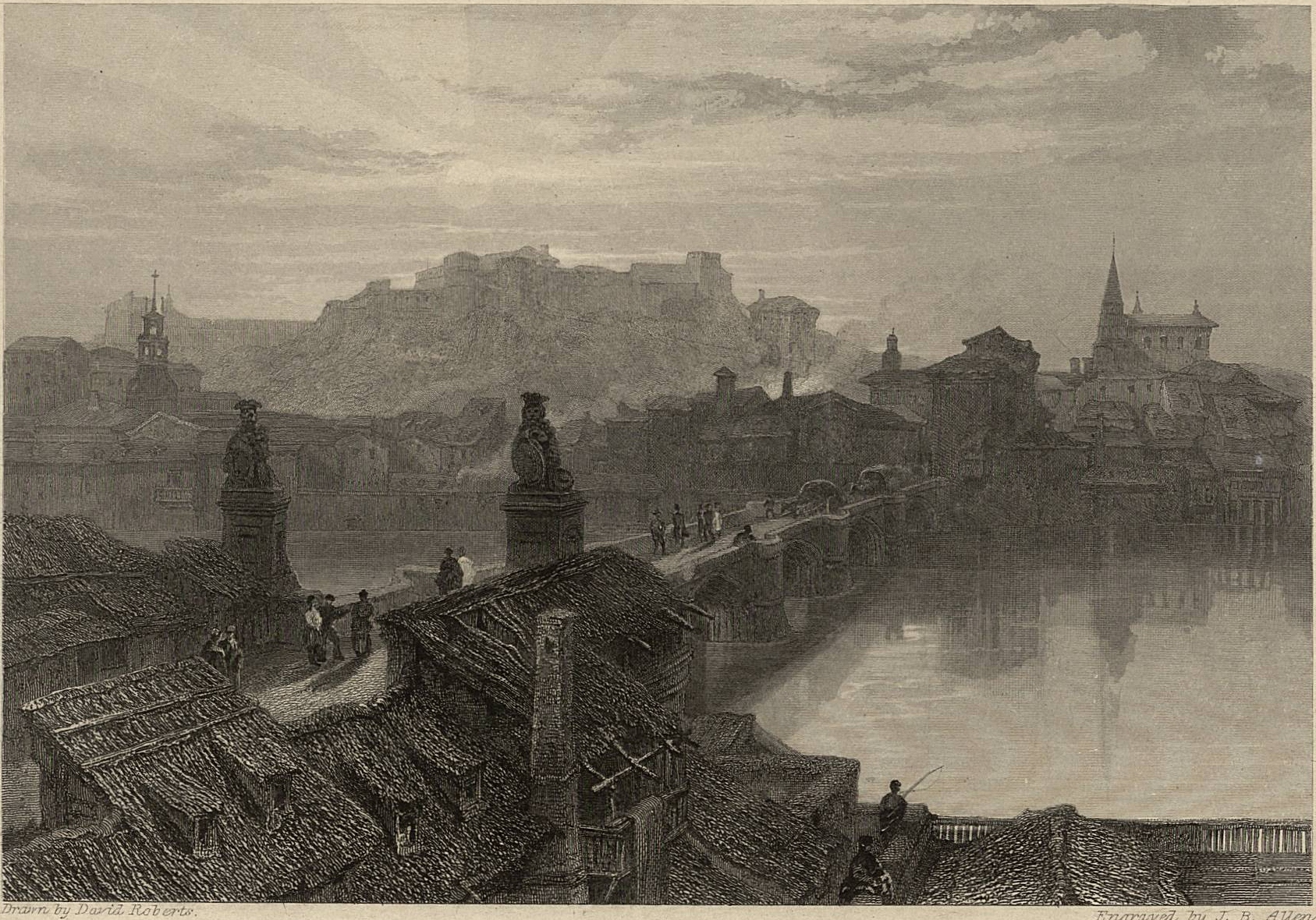
Engraving from 1836.

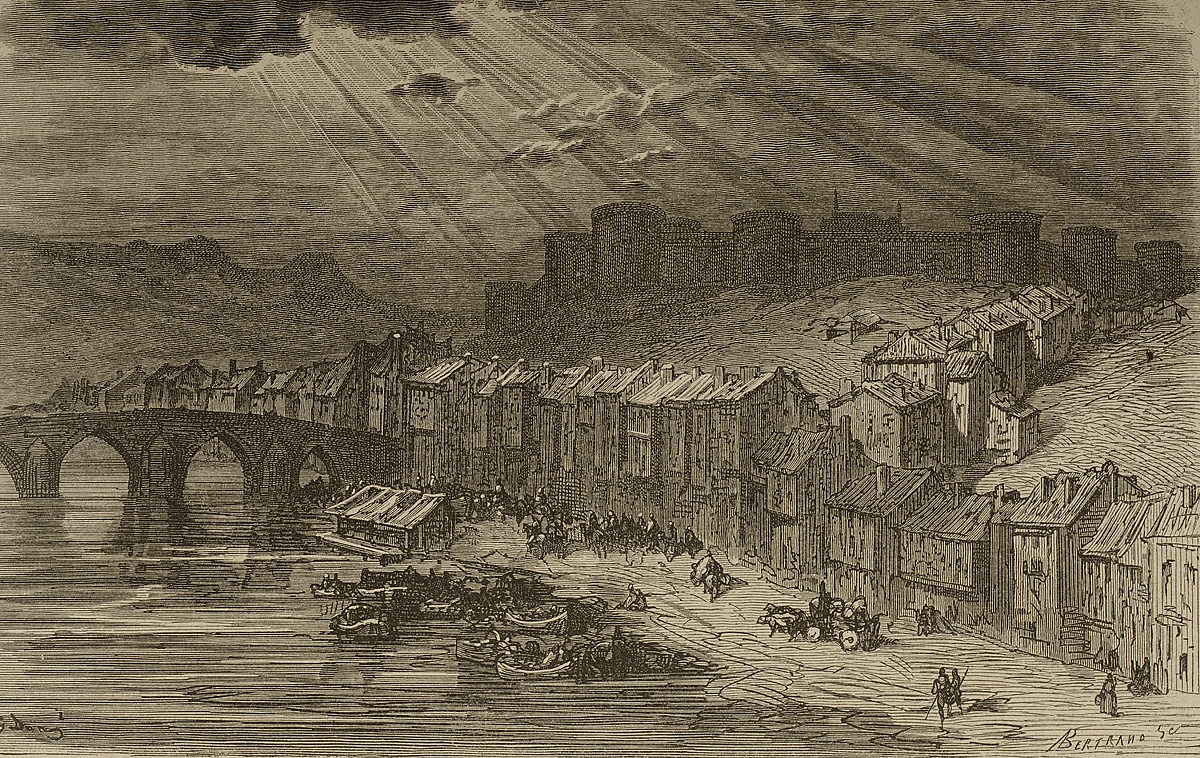
Engraving of Miranda de Ebro made in 1862. The medieval bridge prior to that of 1777 can be seen.

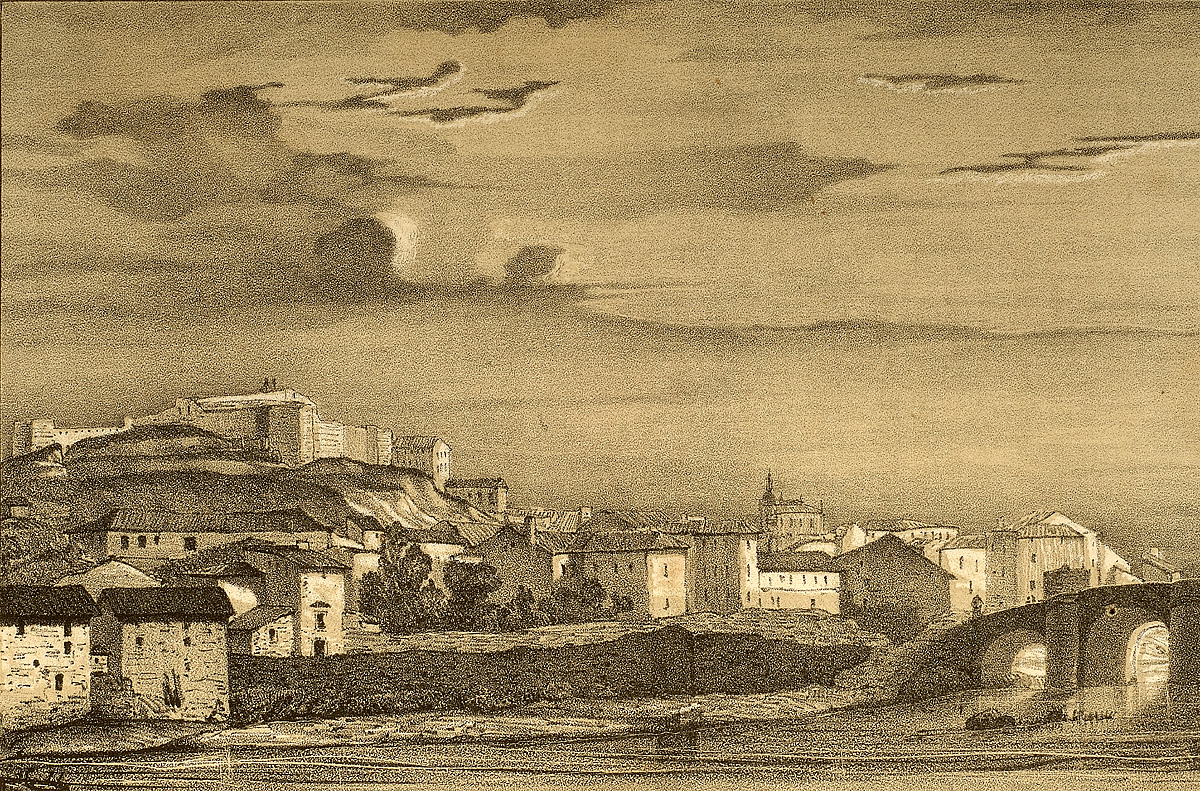
Engraving of Miranda de Ebro around 1846.

Throughout history, various people have left their impressions of the town. Thanks to these small annotations, it is possible to establish what the town was like in former times. The first record of the urban appearance of Miranda de Ebro dates from 20 May 1524, and reads:

[...] it is a beautiful and peaceful place for the population it has; the streets are beautiful and tiled and the houses are good [...] leaving by a very beautiful bridge towards Armiñón. Magnífico Micer Andrés Navagero.

Between 1679 and 1681, the Countess of D'Aulnoy made a journey through Spain, and when she arrived in Miranda she wrote some notes:

'it is a large town or a small village. There is a large square adorned with a fountain. The river Ebro, which is one of the largest in Spain, flows through it; a castle with several towers can be seen on the top of a hill. It seems to be of some kind of defence and there is a spring so abundant that it flows out of a rock on which it is built that it moves several mills from its source. As for the rest, I did not notice anything that deserves to be written about.

The Municipal Archive of Miranda de Ebro has a document from 1719 in which it comments:

there is an inventory of the facilities of the town. Bridge, council house, butcher's shop, children's school, grammar school, five mills, two hospitals, a fountain, four convents, a castle, thirteen inns, fourteen inns for horsemen, twenty-two ruined manor houses and other inhabited buildings in good condition.

Antonio Ponz commented in his book Viaje fuera de España (Travel Outside of Spain) of 1785:

[...] the circumstance of having arrived somewhat late at Miranda, and the precision of leaving early the following day, did not give me the time to recognise it except for a very large part. It has the convenience of the Ebro that passes next to the town with a large bridge with eight spans between it and the suburb. It seemed to me to be the same town as Pancorvo, with very good countryside and two parishes.

There is a document called Descripcion sucinta de Miranda de Ebro de Cantabria (Brief Description of Miranda de Ebro of Cantabria) dated 1787 and probably written by a clergyman of the parish of Santa María. It is the first attempt to make a historical review of the city, and after reviewing the history of Miranda, it says:

[...] there is a doctor, a surgeon, two apothecaries, a teacher of first letters and study as well as a post office with two officers, a tannery, three markets, some shops, twenty-four craftsmen, two tobacco shops and the common wine taverns, grocer's and butcher's [...].

In the Diary of Gaspar Melchor de Jovellanos, on 31 August 1791, the city is mentioned and it is said:

[...] it comes running this river (Ebro) from right to left, almost North-South, and passes over a bridge. Before arriving, about a quarter of a league long, a monument of good architecture is being finished. It is a pyramid on four fronts, cut off at the top, with some sculpture and inscription in the two directions of the road, which I could not see; perhaps it is the dividing line between Alava and Castile. Miranda Castle, defeated.

Richard Ford was however very critical in his Manual para viajeros por España (Handbook for Travellers in Spain) dating from the beginning of the second third of the 19th century (1844). He commented:

Miranda is completely uninteresting, it has 2500 inhabitants, an old church with a doorway in front of it and a good bridge across the Ebro which opens the way to the Basque provinces, being the fiscal frontier of Castile, and for this reason the customs offices are located here.

In 1850, Pascual Madoz commented in his Diccionario Geográfico-Estadístico-Histórico de España y sus posesiones de ultramar (Geographical, Statistical and Historical Dictionary of Spain and its Overseas Possessions):

Town entirely surrounded by an embattled fence with three lines of defence.

And as a reference to the railway station of Miranda de Ebro, in 1878, a traveller arriving by train commented that in Miranda there are 700 houses of which 200 were of modern construction, emphasising the recent construction of the railway station:

Situated half a kilometre from the town, it is undoubtedly the best on the said line.

== Monumental architecture ==
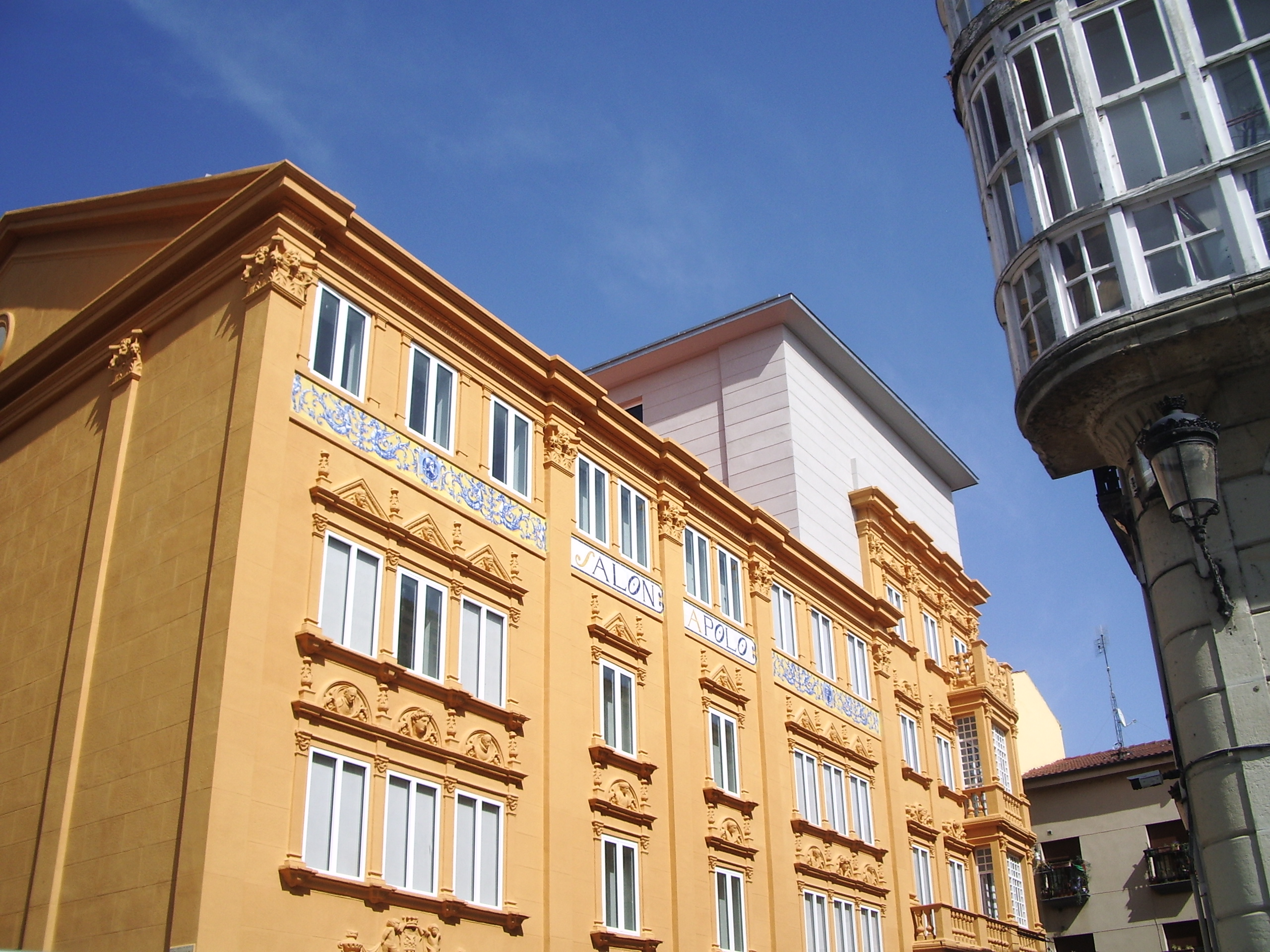
Apolo Theatre, in neoclassicist style.

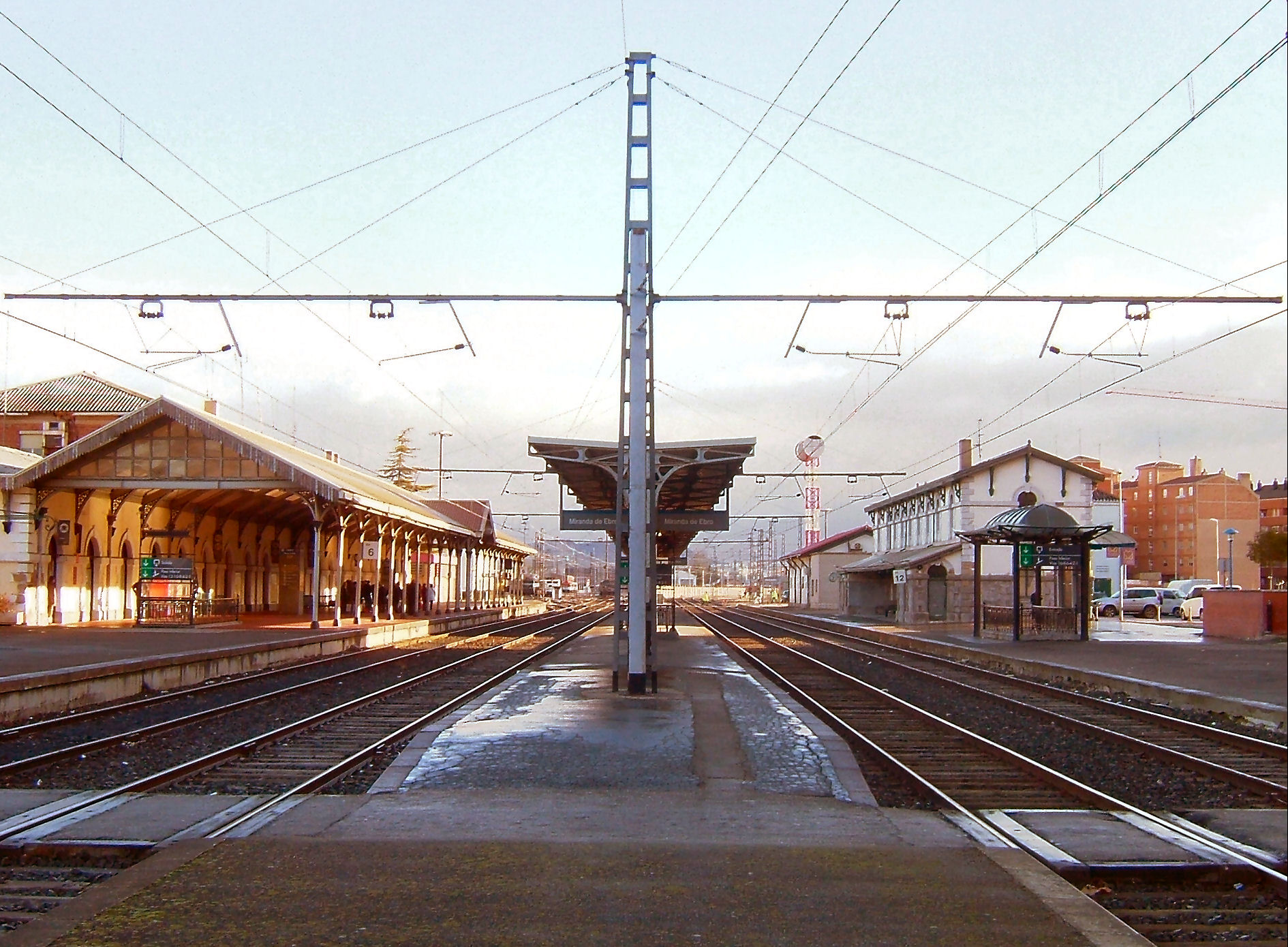
Miranda de Ebro railway station.

=== Buildings ===
- Charles III Bridge: Built in 1777 under the direction of Francisco Alejo de Aranguren, it consists of 6 arches and has starlings on both sides to reduce the impact of the water. Two lions have guarded the bridge since 1786, the work of the Alava sculptor Juan Antonio de Moraza; one of them holds the royal coat of arms and the other that of the city.
- Town Hall: The current Town Hall has stood in the Plaza de España since 1788. The building is the work of Francisco Alejo de Aranguren and was revised by Ventura Rodríguez. It is a neoclassical building, built in ashlar. The upper floor openings are topped with alternating triangular and semicircular pediments.
- Manor houses: Several manor houses dot the old quarter of Miranda de Ebro. The 16th century Casa de las Cadenas stands out. Here Napoleon Bonaparte and King Ferdinand VII of Spain stayed, and in 1828 he placed chains as a souvenir of his stay. Another notable building is the Casa de los Urbina, also from the 16th century, in which its defensive cubes stand out. King Philip IV of Spain stayed here on his way to France, as did Margaret of Savoy, vicereine of Portugal, where she died in 1655.
- Railway Station: Built in 1862 by the English architect Charles Vignoles, this is one of the oldest railway stations in northern Spain. The Madrid-Irún and Castejón-Bilbao lines converge here. Its Victorian-style canopies stand out for their iron canopies, which were cast in the Frederick Braby workshops in London.
- Apolo Theatre: This unique building, built in 1921, is the work of the Riojan architect Fermín Álamo. Its historicist decoration stands out, as evidenced by the busts erected in the windows and the plant ornamentation. The adjoining building is in the same style and will be joined to the theatre after its refurbishment, which began in 2010 and will last until 2013.
- Ruins of the Castle: Of the castle of Miranda, only a few walls remain. It was built in the 14th century by Count Don Tello. It remained operational until the 19th century during the Carlist Wars. At the beginning of the 20th century it was dismantled and filled with earth, and many of its stones were used to build the bullring, which no longer exists.
- La Picota: Sculpted in 1569 by the local master Maese Miguel de Aguirre, this is the ‘rollo de la villa’, a symbol of judicial power.

=== Religious buildings ===
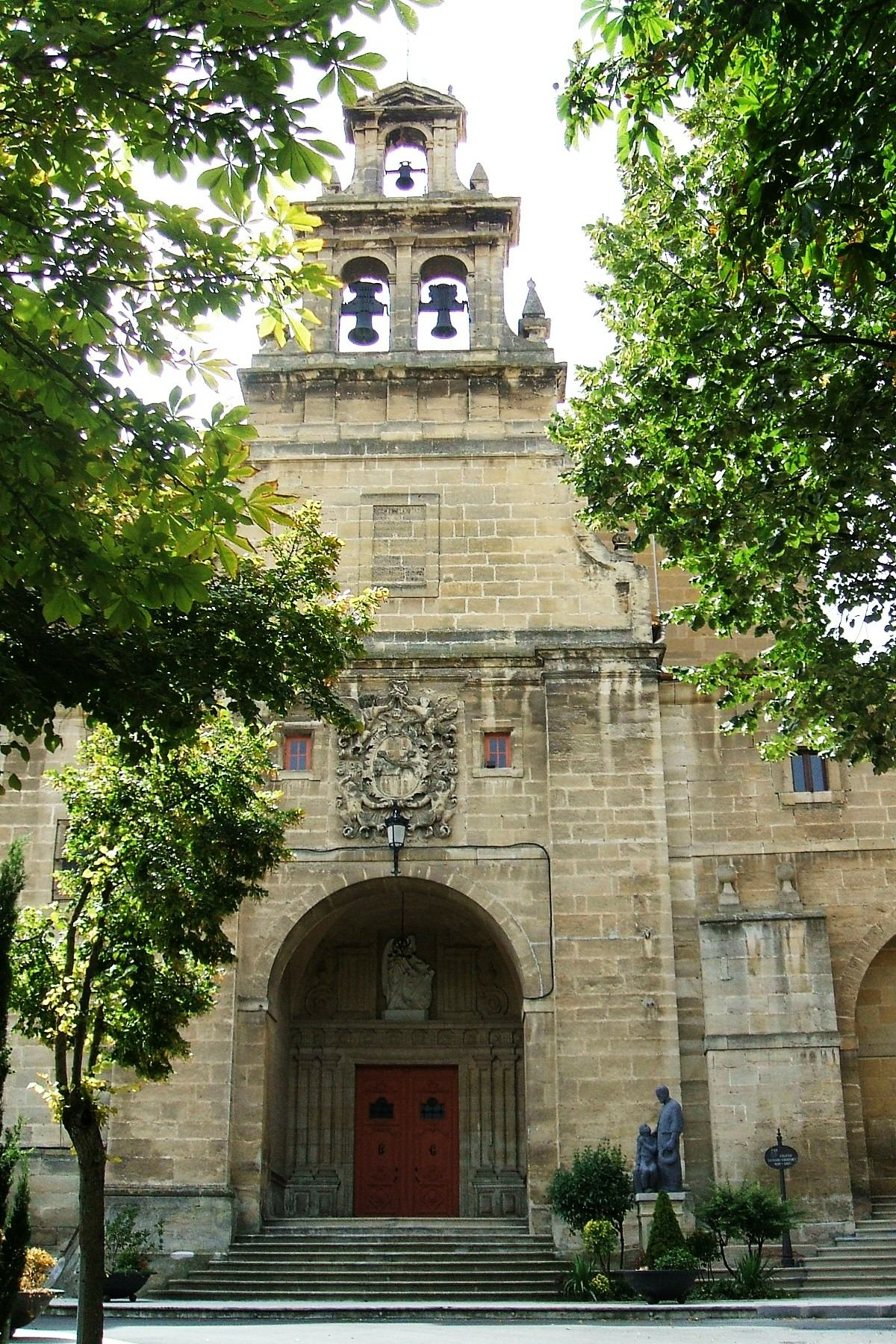
Church of Sacred Hearts

- Church of the Holy Spirit: It was formerly known under the name of ‘San Nicolás’. It is a Romanesque temple that is already mentioned in the Fuero de Miranda in 1099. Its façade and apse date from the 13th century and its small Gothic nave from the 16th century. Before the Civil War (May 1936), it suffered considerable damage and since its restoration it has been known as the Church of the Holy Spirit.
- Church of Santa María: Built in the 16th century, its style is somewhere between Renaissance and late Gothic. The mummified body of Pascual Martínez ‘El Chantre’ rests inside.
- Church of Sacred Hearts: Located in the former Convent of San Francisco, the church was built in the 16th century. Its Baroque españada, built in 1693, stands out.
- Former church of San Juan: Hidden among the houses, the former church of San Juan has been in ruins since 1875. In spite of this, the main naves, decorated with a careful polychromy, the baptismal font and the poly-lobed ogival windows are preserved inside.
- Church of San Nicolás: Built in 1945, its design came second in the National Architecture Competition of that year. It has three basilica-like naves, an apse and a large rose window on its façade. Inside, the large canvases attached to the wall of the apse painted by Manuel Navarro and his brother stand out.

=== Other places ===
- Market Hall: Inaugurated in 1917, it is located right in the centre. It stands out for its solidity and its certain Islamic finish.
- Former Convent of the RR.MM. Agustinian Recollects: The Troconiz family built a northern style villa in 1911, later sold it to the RR.MM. Agustinian Recollects who extended it in 1950 with a chapel in a similar style. Its pyramidal tower and its cushioned stone façade stand out. Since 1998 it has belonged to the sub-delegation of the Junta de Castilla y León.

== Neighbourhoods ==
Miranda de Ebro has 13 neighbourhoods:

- Aquende: Also called Casco Viejo. This is where the first settlement of the city was established. Located on the right bank of the Ebro and on the slopes of La Picota hill, it still preserves its medieval flavour. It is home to the Town Hall, the Apolo Theatre, the convent of San Francisco, as well as numerous small palaces and churches. Its streets are long and narrow, and it is the most important leisure area of the city, especially on weekends.
- Allende: This is the second oldest neighbourhood in the city after the Casco Viejo. It is located on the left bank of the river Ebro and arose after the construction of a bridge over the river. It is a residential neighbourhood whose architecture dates from the end of the 19th century and the beginning of the 20th century. The church of the Holy Spirit is located in this neighbourhood.
- Anduva: This neighbourhood emerged in the second half of the 20th century. Eminently residential, it is notable for its tower buildings and its numerous facilities (schools, church, sports and cultural centres, etc.). The toponym Anduva is of medieval Basque origin.
- Barriada de San Juan: A working-class neighbourhood built in the first half of the 20th century where the workers of the old municipal slaughterhouse lived.
- Bardauri: The neighbourhood of Bardauri is located two kilometres from the city. Its name comes from the Basque language. Bardauri is home to the 12th century church of Santa Marina.
- Bayas: The district is located on the banks of the river that gives it its name, the river Bayas. Its appearance is still that of a village, although the Bayas Industrial Estate and the Bayas Multifunctional Pavilion are just a few metres away. The best example of art in Bayas is the 16th-17th century church of Santa Ana.

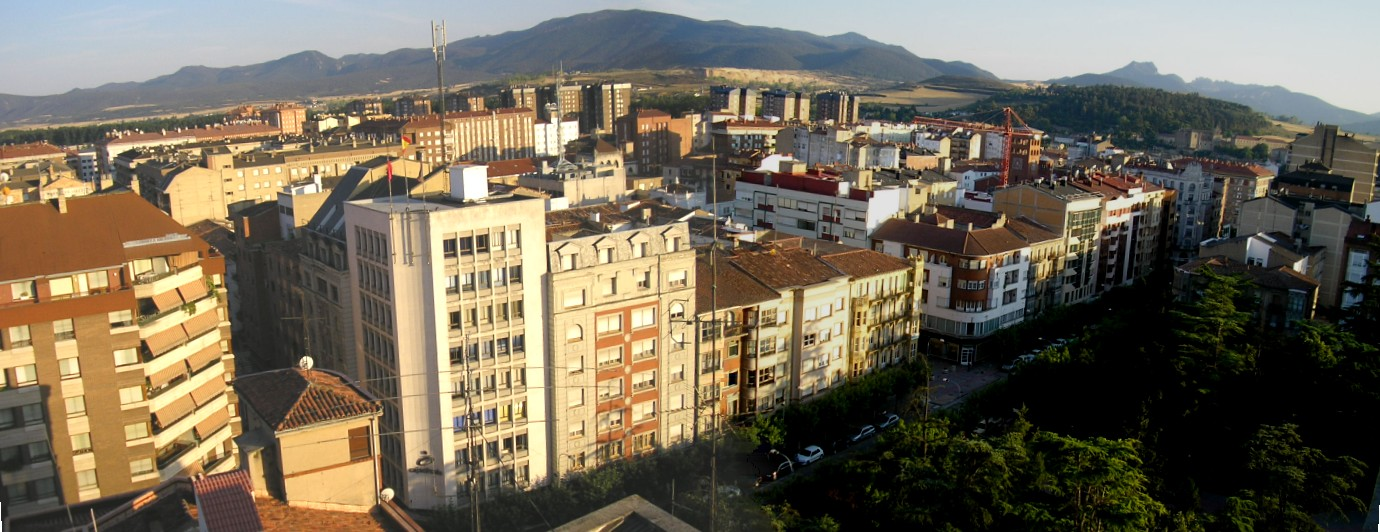
Panoramic view of the city's Ensanche.

- Ensanche: This is the largest and most densely populated area of the city. It has a marked commercial and residential character. It was born at the beginning of the 20th century with the reform carried out by Federico Keller. It has a typical orthogonal plan that organises the blocks in a grid and the perpendicular streets; in a similar way, keeping distances, to the Ensanche in Barcelona. Its central axis is La Estación Street, a street that was created at the end of the 19th century to connect Allende with the railway station. It is currently in the process of being pedestrianised.
- El Crucero: Residential area located 2 km from the town centre.
- La Charca: The neighbourhood of La Charca is located in the east of the city and has recently undergone a major transformation. The Charca neighbourhood is home to the largest park in the city, the Alcalde Emiliano Bajo park.
- Las Matillas: This is a neighbourhood located in the north of the city. It is separated from the city centre by the railway installations and the N-1 road, which means that communications with it are problematic. The name Matillas comes from the small bushes or shrubs that used to populate the area.
- Miranda Sur: This is the last neighbourhood to be planned in the city. It will extend from the widening of the city to the Bayas river. Its model will be of a ‘garden city’ type with wide streets and squares. The new football stadium will be located here. The construction of some 2,000 dwellings is planned for this neighbourhood.
- Los Ángeles: A ‘garden city’ type neighbourhood that was inaugurated in 1948 with the aim of housing the workers of the paper company FEFASA.
- Los Corrales: This neighbourhood is located on the way to San Juan del Monte. In the past it was a livestock and agricultural neighbourhood, hence its name. Next to the neighbourhood is the model aeroplane track and the municipal rubbish dump.

== Parks and gardens ==
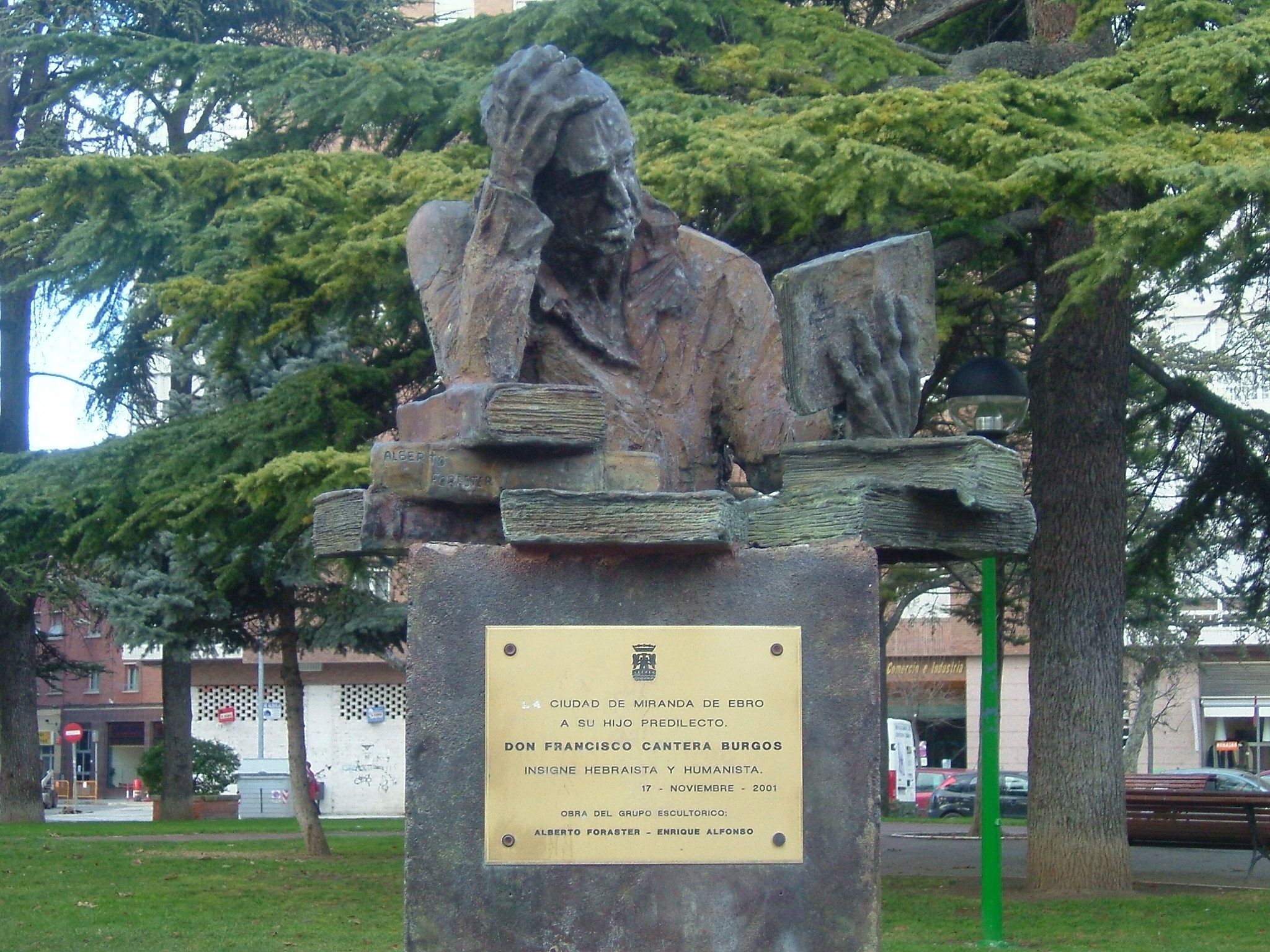
Monument to Francisco Cantera in the Antonio Machado Park.

The most central park in Miranda de Ebro is the Antonio Machado Park, which has a surface area of 12,500 square metres and was inaugurated in 1915. It is a park that combines two very different styles; while the cross in the centre, with its benches and wide walkways, has to do with the French style, the four flowerbeds in the corners stand out for their tall trees and the large lawns typical of English parks. In 1927 a kiosk was created in the centre of the park, which three years later was covered with a beautiful dome designed by Fermín Álamo. The park is also home to the monuments to La Banda de Música, Francisco Cantera and the IX Centenary of the Fuero de Miranda.

The Antonio Cabezón Park extends over 18,000 square metres of small hills full of grass. It is a recreational area that comes especially alive in summer when young people chat on the grass or watch films in the open air. Until May 2007 the park was dominated by a beautiful steam locomotive which was moved to Ronda del Ferrocarril avenue.

The Alcalde Emiliano Bajo Park is the largest park in the city with a surface area of around 50,000 m²; the ornamental fountain and the monument to the city's centenary are the highlights of this space. The Jardinillos and the Plaza de Cervantes form a central recreational area with small flowerbeds, planters and benches. In the near future, an 80,000 square metre park will be created on the banks of the River Bayas and a small garden in front of the church of the Sacred Hearts.

The city also has a botanical garden next to the former convent of the handmaids of Jesus in the historic centre. The Botanical Garden of Miranda de Ebro extends over 2400 square metres on the terraces of the hillside of La Picota, where visitors not only enjoy a fresh, peaceful environment with views of the city, but also learn a lot about plants. This botanical garden has about 700 different species identified with their common name, scientific name, variety, family and origin.

== Bridges ==
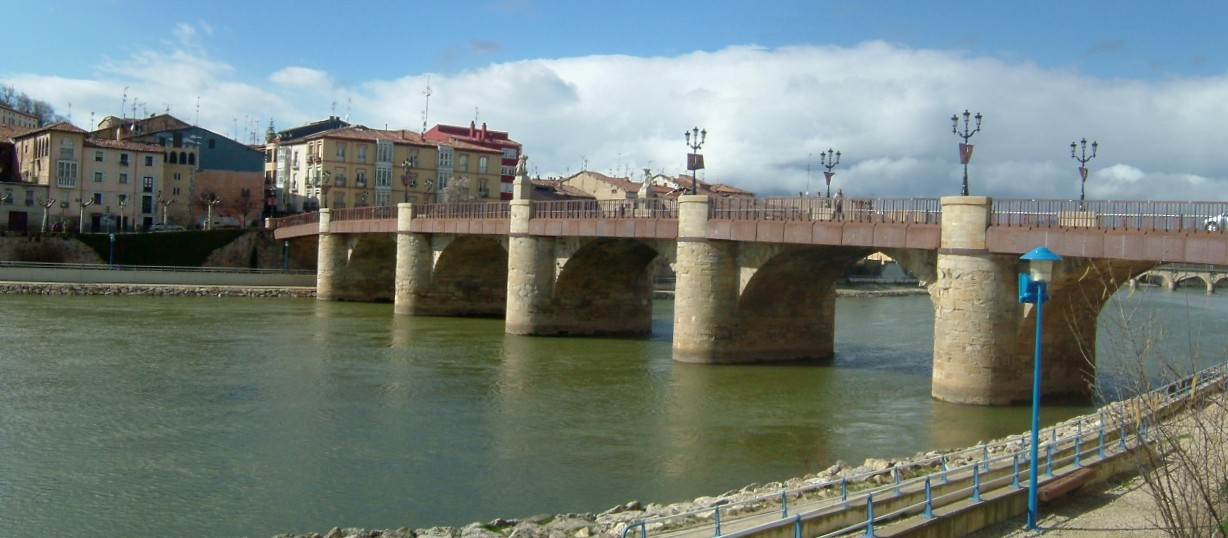
Charles III Bridge over the waters of the River Ebro, built in 1777. Image from 2007.

There are four bridges that cross the river Ebro as it flows through Miranda de Ebro. Starting with the oldest, the Carlos III Bridge, built in 1777 after the previous medieval bridge was destroyed by a severe flood two years earlier. It was designed by the architect Francisco Alejo de Aranguren. The bridge has six semicircular spans and its five piers have starlings to reduce the impact of the water. In the centre of the bridge are two lions sculpted by the Alaves artist Juan Antonio de Moraza in 1786. One of the lions holds the royal coat of arms and the other the coat of arms of the city. It was restored in 2006.

A century later, in the early 1860s, two new bridges were built for the same purpose: to allow the railway to cross the Ebro. The first was the Bridge of El Inglés (Puente del Inglés) or Iron Bridge (Puente de Hierro), so called because of its metal structure, which was used until 1987. Like the station, it was designed by the English engineer Charles Vignoles and was used to cross the river between Bilbao and Tudela. At the end of 1980, the metal structure was removed and replaced by prefabricated concrete beams. It is currently used for both road and pedestrian traffic.

The other viaduct is the Pont du Français, designed by the French engineer C. A. Letourneur. It is a stone bridge made of ashlar with masonry ledges. It has six semicircular spans and was built for the Compañía de los Caminos de Hierro del Norte de España for the line from Madrid to Irún. It is still in service today.

The need to divert traffic from the N-1 road that passed over the Carlos III Bridge meant that a new bridge had to be built in 1953. The bridge was designed in the image and likeness of the bridges built by the engineer Eduardo Torroja. It spans the river with an elegant 60-metre low arch supported by two large reinforced concrete piers.

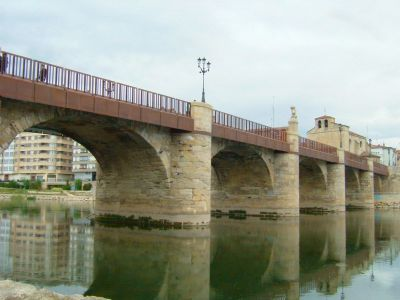
Charles III Bridge (Puente Carlos III)

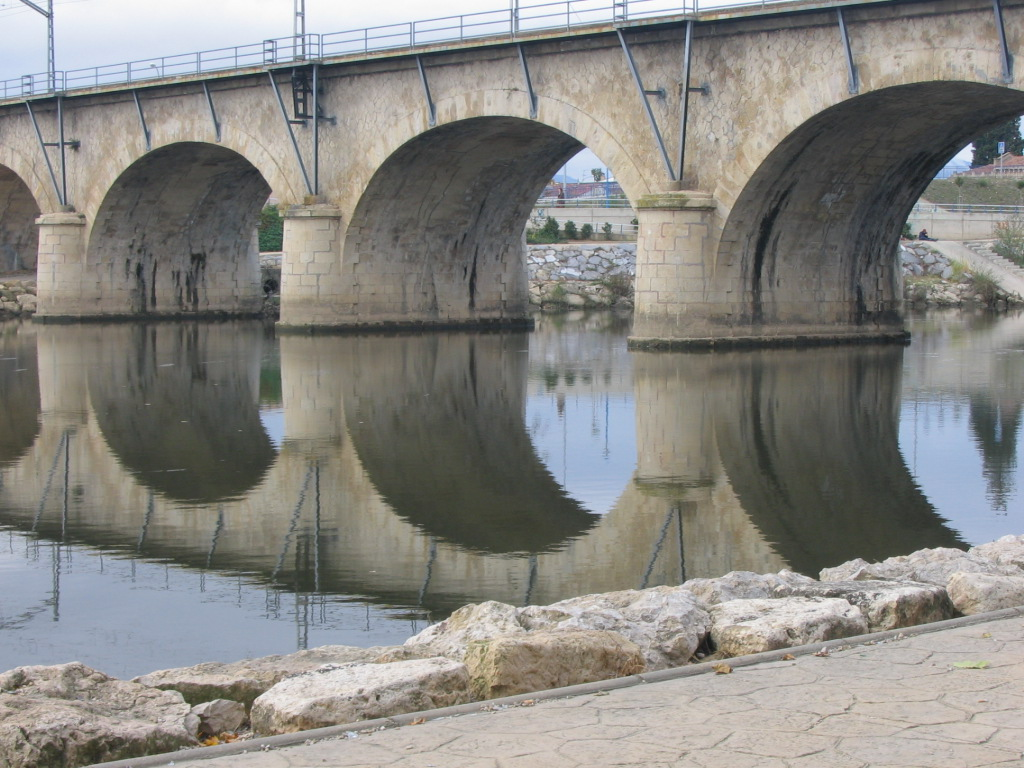
Bridge of El Francés (Bridge del Francés)

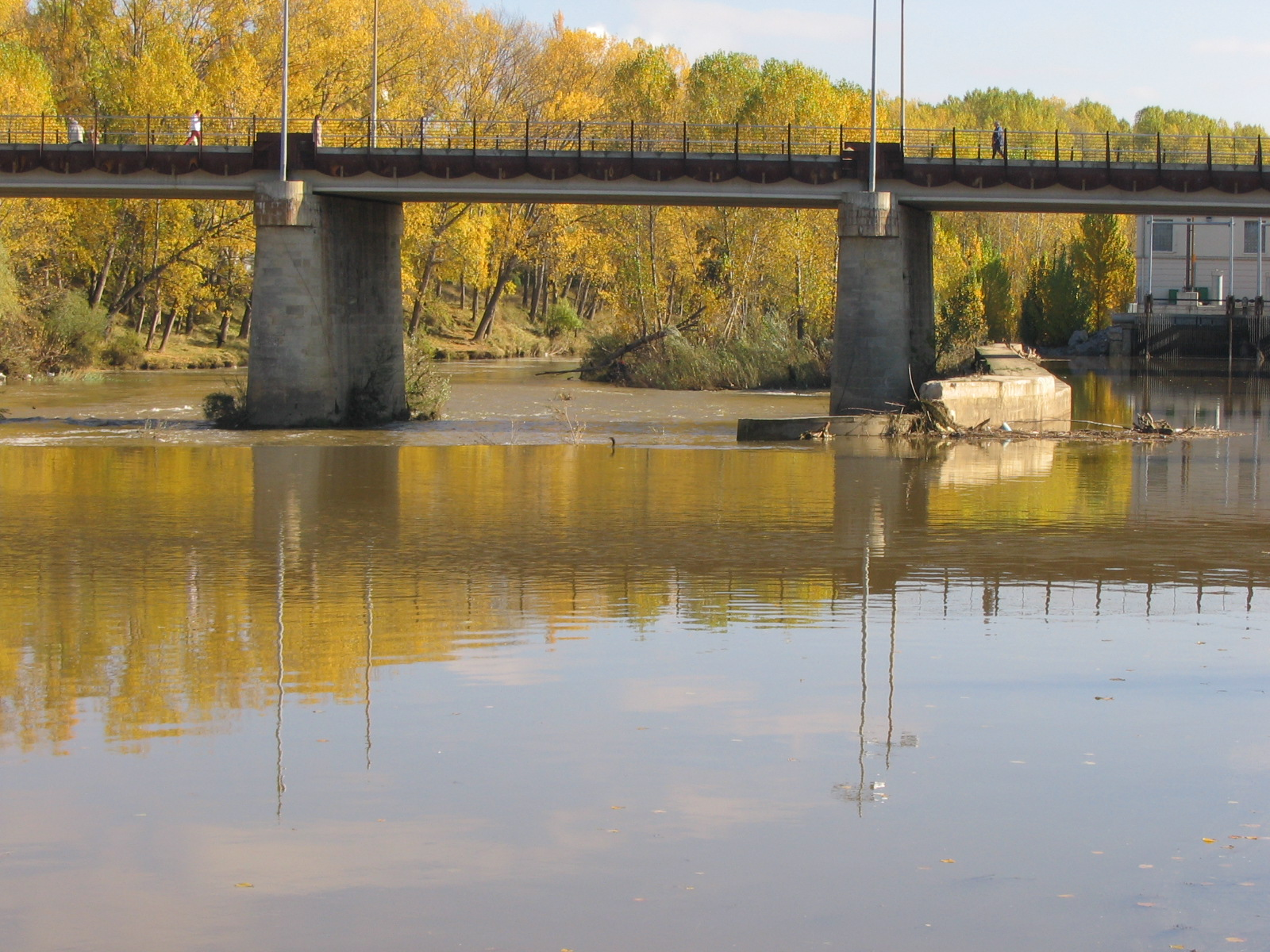
Iron Bridge (Puente de Hierro)

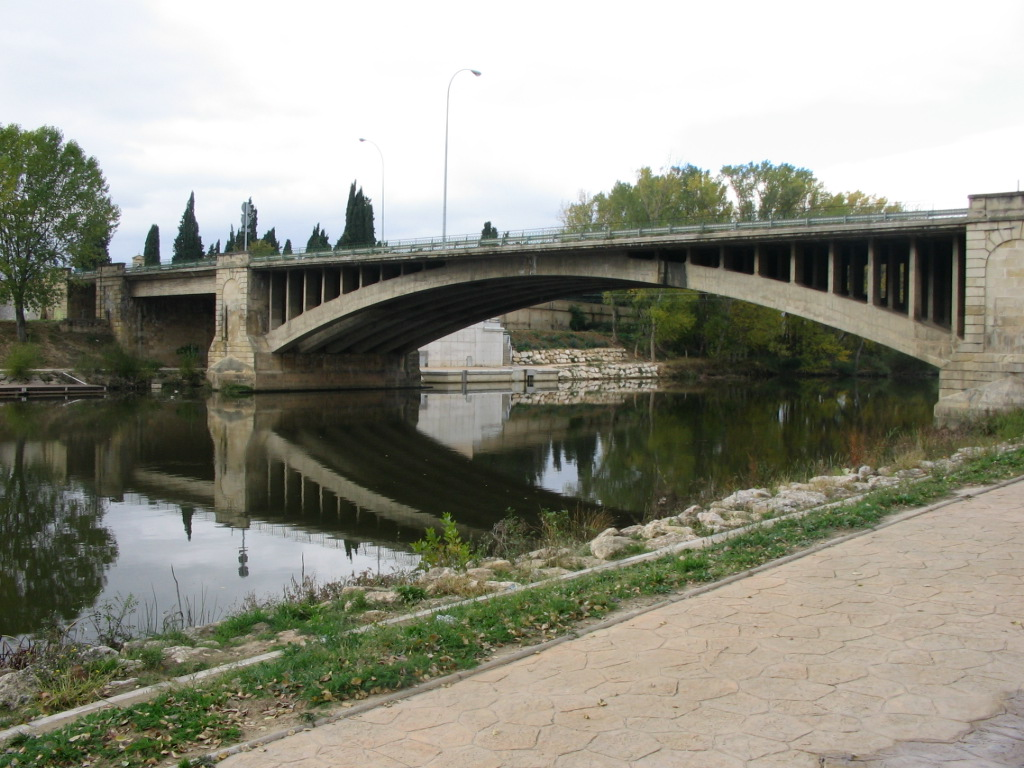
National I Bridge (Puente de la Nacional I)

== See also ==
- Miranda de Ebro

== Bibliography ==
- Diez Javiz, Carlos; Vigalondo, Alberto Julian (2001). Miranda de Ebro: Historia del urbanismo y guía de arquitectura [Miranda de Ebro: History of Town Planning and Guide to Architecture] (in Spanish). Ayuntamiento de Miranda de Ebro. ISBN 84-607-2287-2.
- Diez Javiz, Carlos (2016). Exorno artístico de Miranda de Ebro (Burgos) y su comarca [Artistic Decoration of Miranda de Ebro (Burgos) and its District] (PDF) (in Spanish). Ayuntamiento de Miranda de Ebro.
- Ojeda San Miguel, Ramón (1999). Historia de Miranda de Ebro [History of Miranda de Ebro] (PDF) (in Spanish). Ayuntamiento de Miranda de Ebro. ISBN 84-606-3048-X.
