= Apollo Theater (Miranda de Ebro) =

- Salón Apolo Theatre
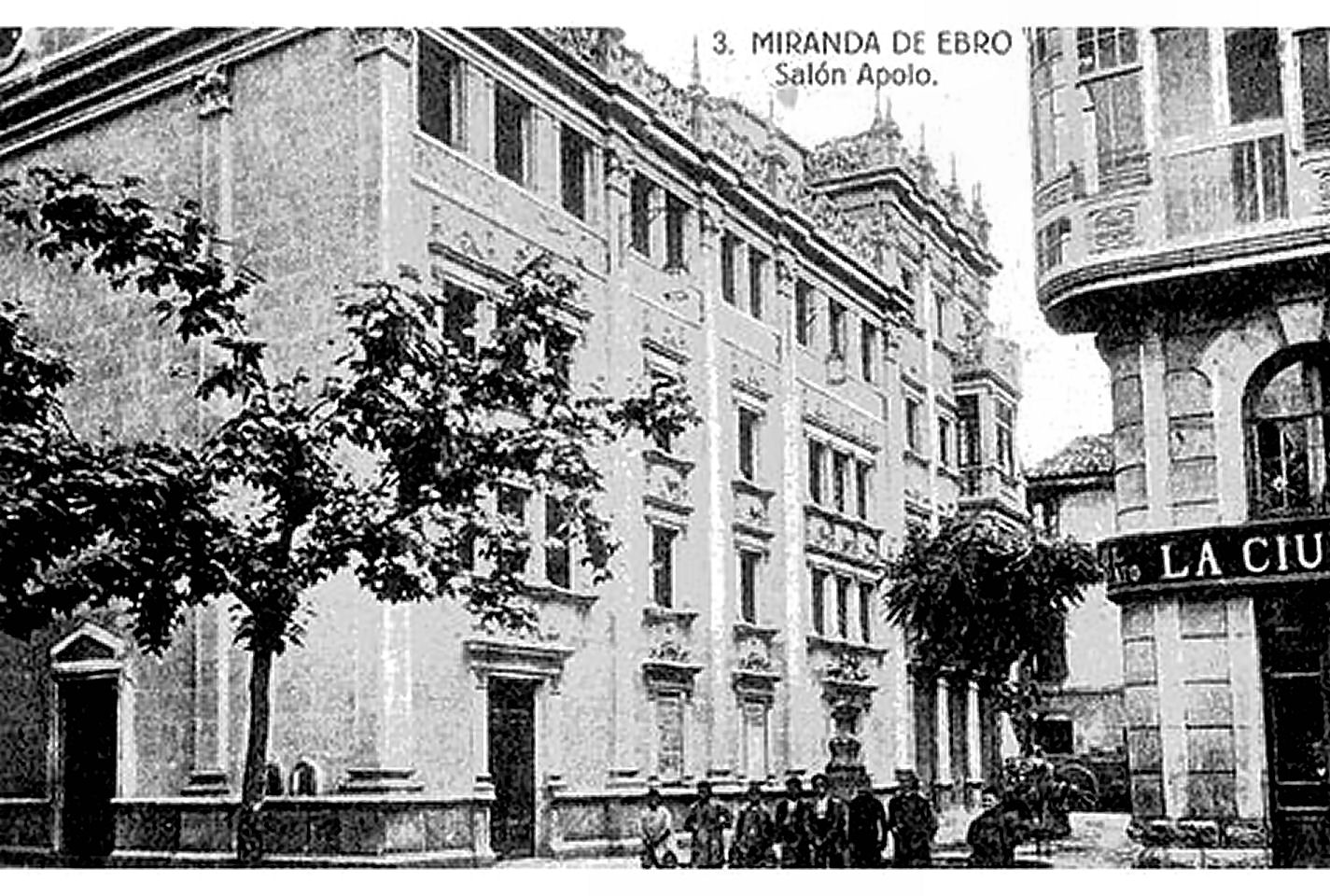
- Apollo Theatre, Miranda de Ebro (1920s)
- Interactive map of Apollo Theater
- Address: Pza. Santa María s/n Miranda de Ebro; Spain
- Coordinates: 42°41′00″N 2°57′10″W

Construction
- Built: 1921
- Opened: 4 October 1921
- Architects: Original building: Fermín Álamo (1920); Rebuilt: Miguel Verdú Belmonte (2015)

The Apollo Theater (also Teatro Salón Apolo) is the main theater of Miranda de Ebro, (Burgos), Spain. It is located in the historic center of the city, next to the church of Santa María. Built in 1921 and in a state of ruin since 1987, it was rehabilitated and reopened in 2015.

== History ==
Where the theater is today, there was a recreational society and a small palace that burned to the ground on December 28, 1918. The owner of the estate, Doña Dolores Ángel-Zorrilla de Velasco, decided to build a new building dedicated to leisure. The new building was designed in 1920 by Fermín Álamo, an architect from La Rioja, and it was inaugurated on October 4, 1921.

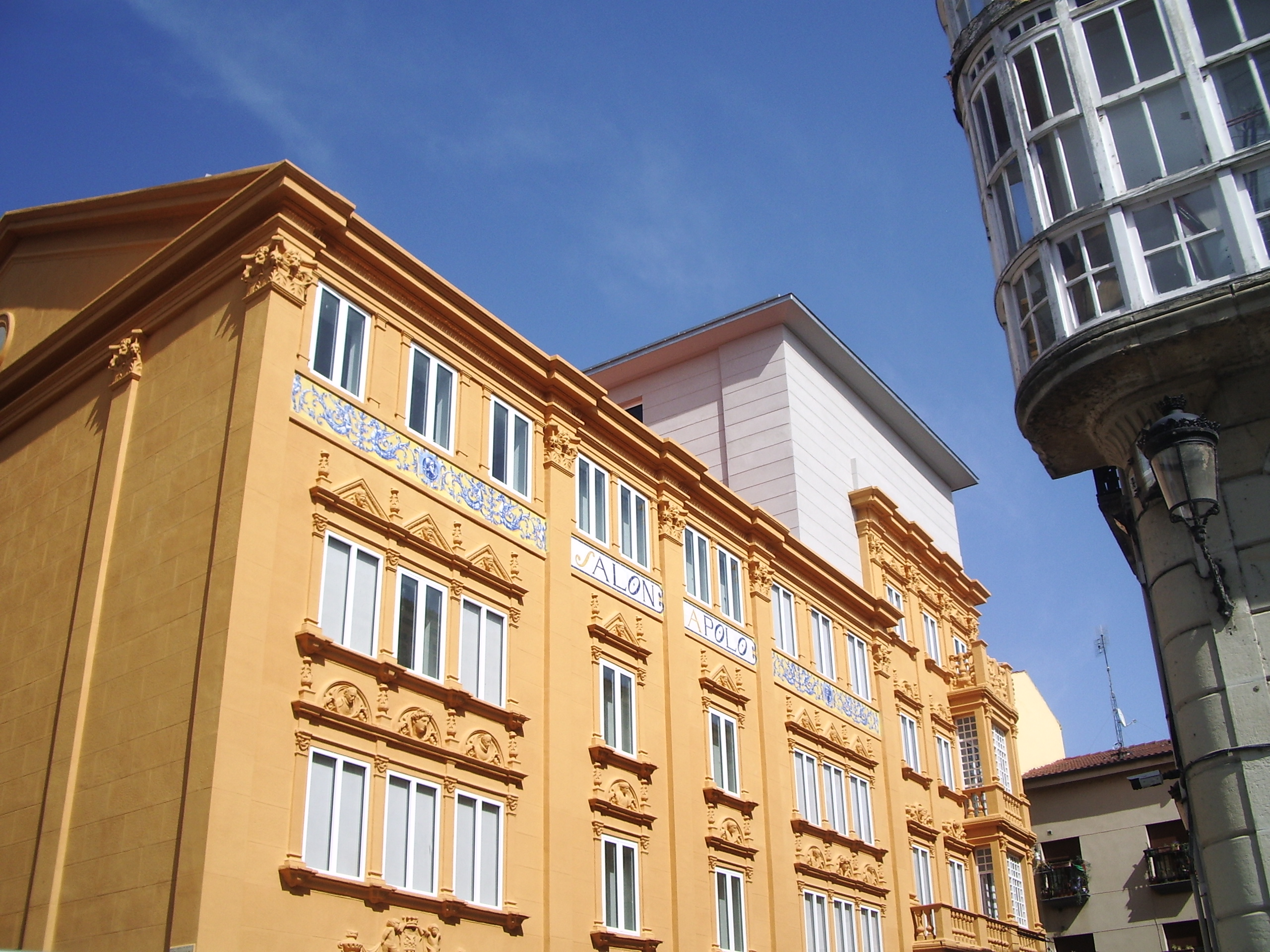
Apollo Theatre

The stage has an area of 147 square metres (1,580 sq ft), and the room has a capacity of 473 spectators distributed between the stalls and the boxes. It was built in the Italian style.

It is a case of Neoclassical architecture.

== See also ==
- Urban planning of Miranda de Ebro
