= Francisco Cantera Burgos =

Spanish historian

Don Francisco Cantera Burgos (Miranda de Ebro, 1901 - Madrid, 1978) was a Spanish historian. He received worldwide recognition for his studies on Jewish culture in Spain.

He studied law at the University of Valladolid and philosophy at Universidad Central de Madrid. He co-founded the Arias Montano Institute and the magazine Sepharad, where he published countless articles. Following the creation of the institute, he served as the first director of the Sephardic Museum in Toledo, Spain.

He was responsible for the translation of the Old Testament in the Bóver-Cantera, Cantera-Iglesias, and Cantera-Pabón Spanish Catholic bible translations. His 1952 work on the Teresa de Cartagena and the Santa María-Cartagena family, the most powerful converso family in late-medieval Spain, remains the standard reference work for the subject.

He was a member of several learned societies, including Real Academia de la Historia, Instituto Histórico y Geográfico de Uruguay, Academia Nacional de la Historia de la República Argentina, Instituto Histórico de Chile, among others.
