= Castle of Miranda de Ebro =

Castle in Castile and León, Spain

Coordinates: 42°40′57″N 2°57′13″W

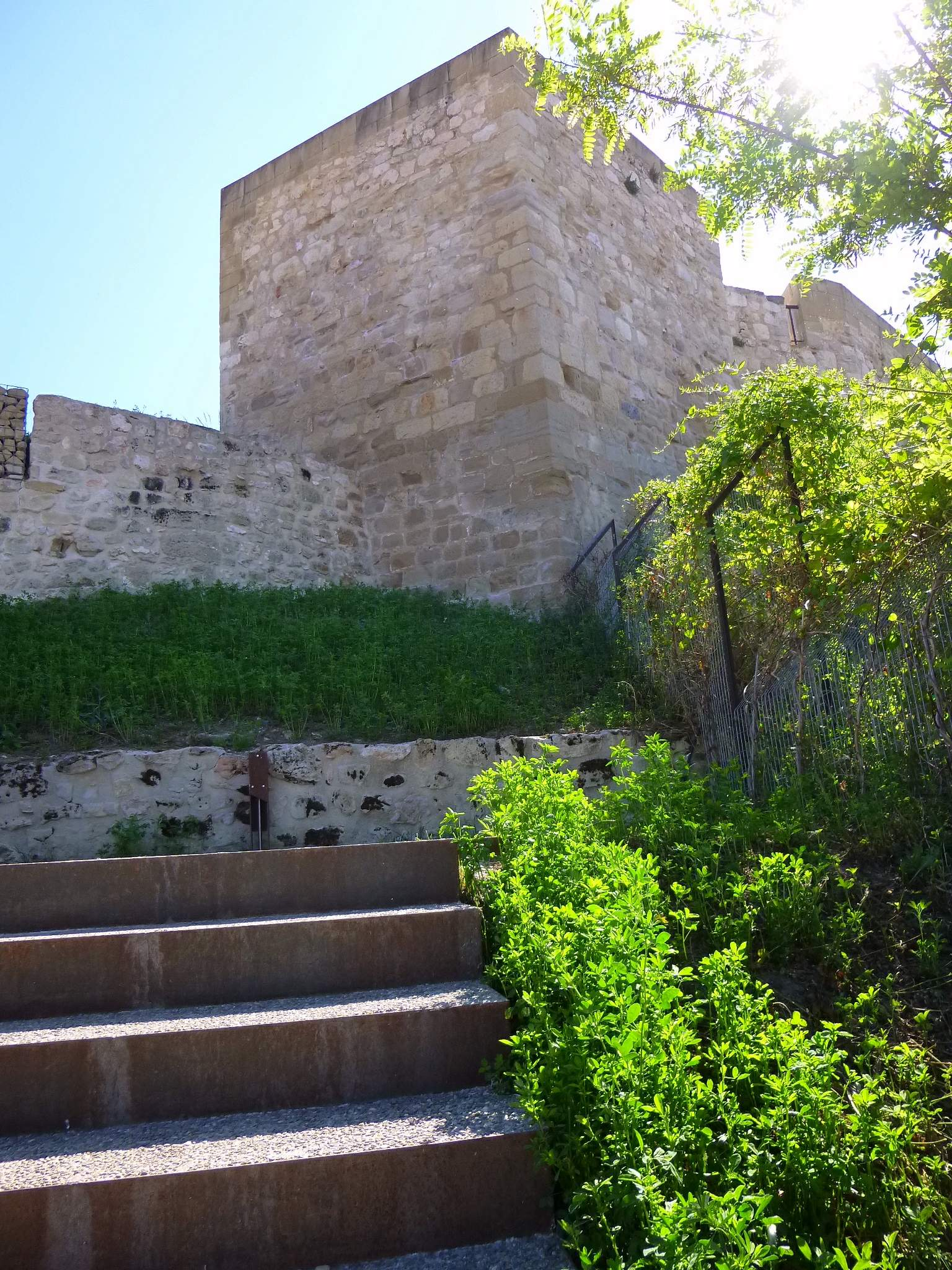
Castle of Miranda de Ebro - Interpretation Center of Ancient Miranda (CIMA).

The Castle of Miranda de Ebro is a mediaeval fortification located in Miranda de Ebro, Spain.

== Location ==
The castle of Miranda de Ebro is located on Picota hill, in the heart of the old helmet of the city. It is positioned about 500 metres above sea level and offers great views of the city and the mountains that surround it.

== History ==
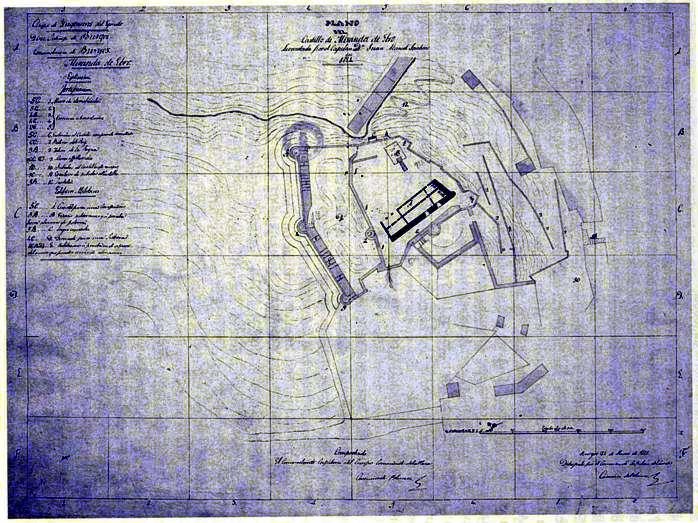
Plan of the castle of Miranda de Ebro in 1844

The origins of the castle of Miranda de Ebro date from 15 October 1358, when Tello of Castille asked the bishopric of Calahorra for the land to construct a castle at the top of the hill of La Picota, a place that was at that time occupied by the church of Santa Maria. Nevertheless, the construction did not begin until 1449, when Pedro Sarmiento occupied the church. Construction was delayed until 1485 and were directed by the expert stonecutter Juan Guas.

The fact that Miranda has been always a border region has caused the castle to witness the consequences of war on numerous occasions, and was continuously redeveloped. The most recent conflict it saw was during the War of Independence of Spain and the Carlist Wars, that left the castle in ruins. Perhaps the most important event of the fortress's history occurred during the War of Spanish Independence, when Jose Bonaparte signed the decree of use of the French currency in Spain at the castle.

In 1903, the city council, which was at the time the owner of the castle, decided to dismantle it. The stone from the castle was used for the construction of the bullring (today disappeared), the ruins of the castle were covered with earth and used as the foundations for the construction of a water tank.

The castle is protected under the generic Declaration of the Decree of 22 of April 1949, and Law 16/1985 on Spanish Historical Patrimony. The value and use of the castle is currently under assessment.

== Description ==
The castle plan had trapezoidal form, with four or five vertices.

Today only the north wall is visible, between the King's Battery and the Queen's Battery. Also preserved, though hidden by vegetation, is the east–west wall and a circular tower in the southwestern edge, which was probably crenellated. The entrance to the fortification was through a barbican: a small defensive system that consisted of a series of entrance halls before the front door. It also had a pit on the west side that looks towards the rest of the hill of the Picota.

The castle was constructed of ashlar masonry stone, or at least the external walls, while the rest was completed with rubble.
