= Castejón, Navarre =

Castejón
- Municipality
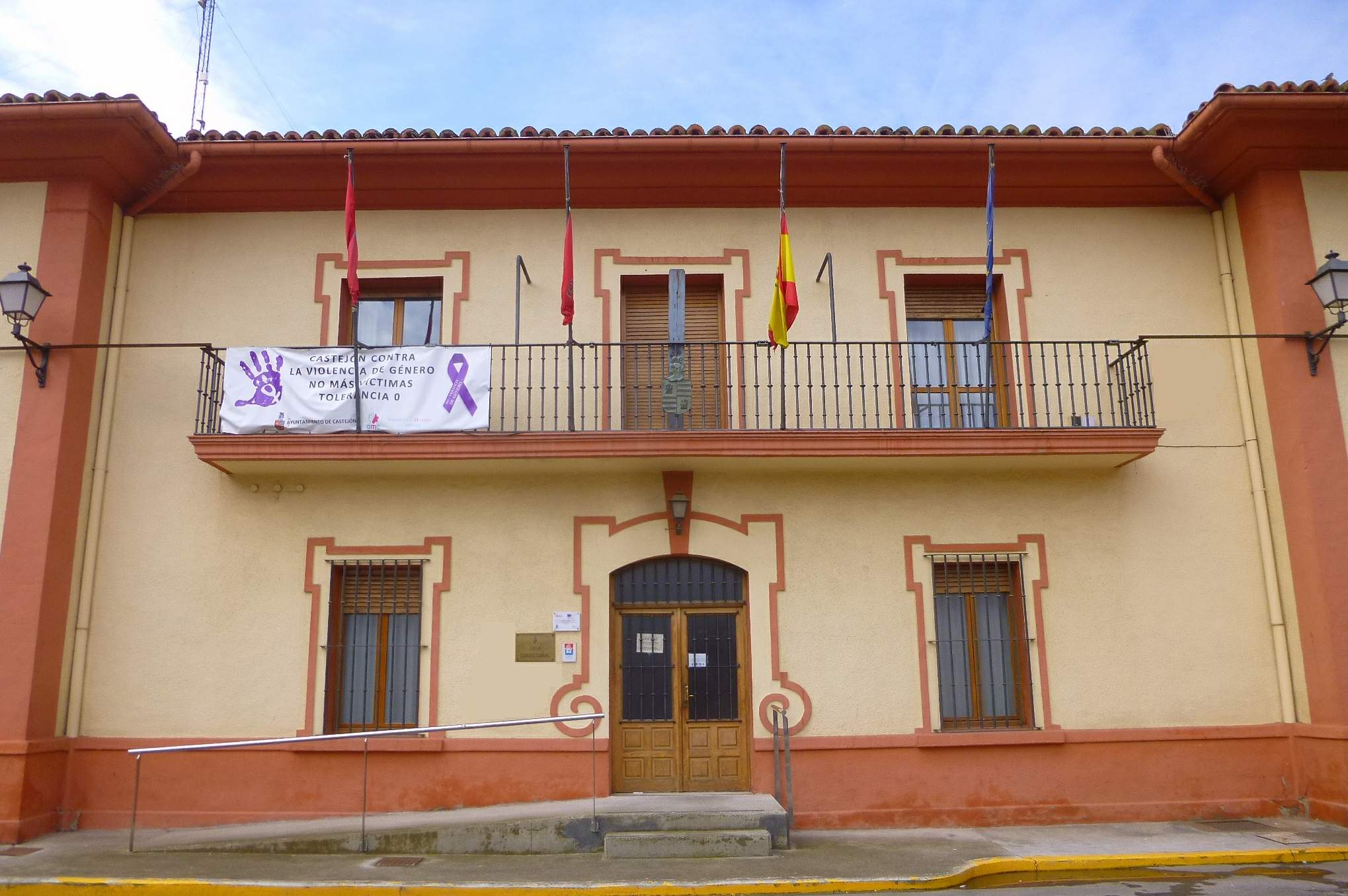
- Town hall

- Flag Coat of arms

- Location in Spain
- Coordinates: 42°09′40″N 1°45′37″W
- Country: Spain
- Autonomous community: Navarre
- Province: Navarre
- Comarca: Tudela

Government
  - Mayor: Francisco Javier Sanz Carramiñan

Area
  - Total: 18.07 km^{2} (6.98 sq mi)
- Elevation: 278 m (912 ft)

Population (2025-01-01)
  - Total: 4,725
  - Density: 261.5/km^{2} (677.2/sq mi)
- Demonym: Castejoneros
- Time zone: UTC+1 (CET)
  - Summer (DST): UTC+2 (CEST)
- Postal code: 31590
- Dialing code: 948

Castejón is a town and municipality located in the province and autonomous community of Navarre, northern Spain.

Castejón is home to Spain's largest photovoltaic power plant (2.44 MWp), which opened in 2006.
