= Carmen (1984 film) =

- French theatrical release poster
- Directed by: Francesco Rosi
- Screenplay by: Francesco Rosi; Tonino Guerra
- Based on: Carmen by Georges Bizet Ludovic Halévy Henri Meilhac; Carmen by Prosper Mérimée
- Produced by: Marcel Dassault; Patrice Ledoux; Alain Poiré
- Starring: Julia Migenes; Plácido Domingo; Ruggero Raimondi; Faith Esham
- Cinematography: Pasqualino De Santis
- Edited by: Ruggero Mastroianni; Colette Semprún
- Music by: Georges Bizet (from the original opera)
- Production companies: Gaumont; Production Marcel Dassault; Opera Film Produzione
- Distributed by: Gaumont Distribution
- Release date: 14 March 1984
- Running time: 152 minutes
- Countries: France; Italy
- Language: French

Carmen is a 1984 French-Italian film directed by Francesco Rosi. It is a film version of Bizet's opera, Carmen. Julia Migenes stars in the title role, Plácido Domingo as Don José, Ruggero Raimondi as Escamillo, and Faith Esham as Micaela. Lorin Maazel conducts the Orchestre National de France.

The film premiered in France on March 14, 1984, and in the U.S. on September 20 of that year. In 1985, the film was nominated for the Golden Globe Award for Best Foreign Film.

== Cast ==
- Julia Migenes-Johnson as Carmen
- Plácido Domingo as Don José
- Ruggero Raimondi as Escamillo
- Faith Esham as Micaëla
- John-Paul Bogart as Zuñiga
- Jean-Philippe Lafont as Dancaïre
- Gérard Garino as Remendado
- Susan Daniel as Mercédès
- Lillian Watson as Frasquita
- François le Roux as Moralès
- Julien Guiomar as Lillas Pastia
- Accursio Di Leo as Guide
- Maria Campano as Manuelita
- Cristina Hoyos as dancer
- Juan Antonio Jiménez as dancer

== Production ==
Rosi selected 1875 for the period and filmed entirely on locations in Andalusia, using Ronda and Carmona and Seville itself to simulate the Seville of that era. He worked with his longtime collaborator, the cinematographer Pasqualino De Santis, and with Enrico Job supervising the sets and costumes. Rosi acknowledged Gustave Doré's illustrations of Spain for Baron Charles Davillier's Spain (which was published in serial form in 1873) as his principal source for the visual design. He believed that Bizet, who never visited Spain, was guided by these engravings, and shot scenes in some of the exact places that Doré drew.

== Critical reception ==
Pauline Kael reviews the film favourably in her collection of movie reviews, State of the Art:

Julia Migenes-Johnson's freckled, gamine Carmen is the chief glory of the production. Her strutting, her dark, messy, frizzy hair—her sexual availability—attract Don José and drive him crazy. Carmen, who's true to her instincts, represents everything he tries to repress. But after he has deserted the Army and lost the respectability that meant everything to him, he thinks she owes him lifelong devotion. Carmen's mistake was in thinking she could take him as a lover on her own terms.

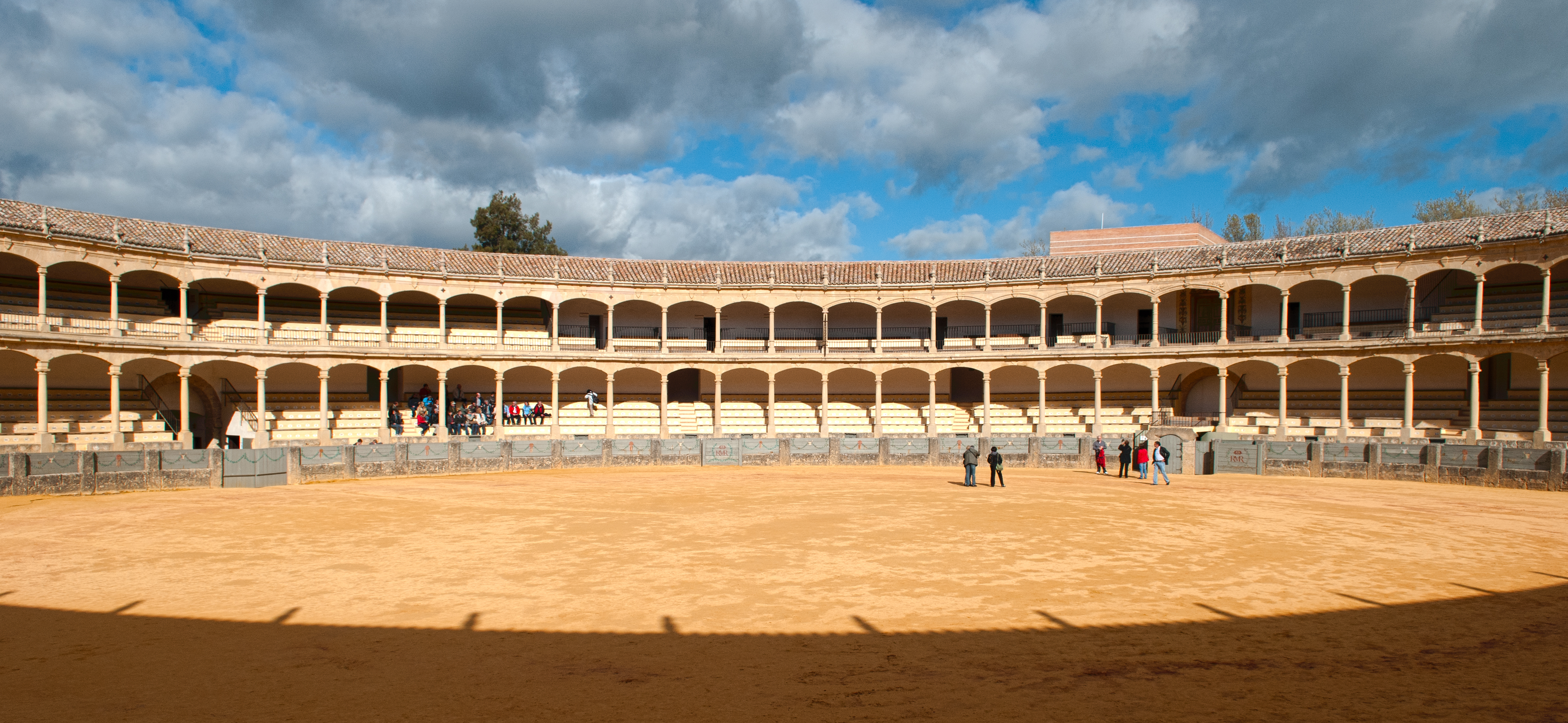
The bullring in Ronda, one of the locations where Carmen was filmed.

On review aggregator website Rotten Tomatoes, the film holds an approval rating of 88% based on 8 reviews, with an average rating of 8.0/10.

== Home media ==
In late 2011 the film was released on both a regular, anamorphically enhanced Region 1 DVD, and on Blu-ray.

== Awards and nominations ==
- 1984 – Golden Globes
  - Nomination: Best Foreign Language Film (France)
- 1986 – BAFTA Awards
  - Nomination: Best Foreign Film (Italy)
  - Nomination: Best Sound for Dominique Hennequin, Hugues Darmois, Bernard Leroux, and Harald Maury
- 1985 – César Award
  - Best Sound for Dominique Hennequin, Guy Level, and Harald Maury
  - Nomination: Best Film for Francesco Rosi
  - Nomination: Best Director for Francesco Rosi
  - Nomination: Best Actress for Julia Migenes-Johnson
  - Nomination: Best Cinematography for Pasqualino De Santis
  - Nomination: Best Production Design for Enrico Job
  - Nomination: Best Costume Design for Enrico Job
- 1985 – David di Donatello
  - Best Film for Francesco Rosi
  - Best Director for Francesco Rosi
  - Best Cinematography for Pasqualino De Santis
  - Best Production Design for Enrico Job
  - Best Costumes for Enrico Job
  - Best Editing for Ruggero Mastroianni
  - Nomination: Best Actress for Julia Migenes-Johnson
  - Nomination: Best Supporting Actor for Ruggero Raimondi
- 1985 – Nastro d'argento
  - Best Scenography for Enrico Job
- 1985 – Grammy Award (soundtrack only)
  - Best Opera Recording for Michel Glotz (audio producer), Lorin Maazel (conductor), Julia Migenes-Johnson, Plácido Domingo, Ruggero Raimondi, and Faith Esham (soloists)
