= Miranda de Ebro =

- Municipality
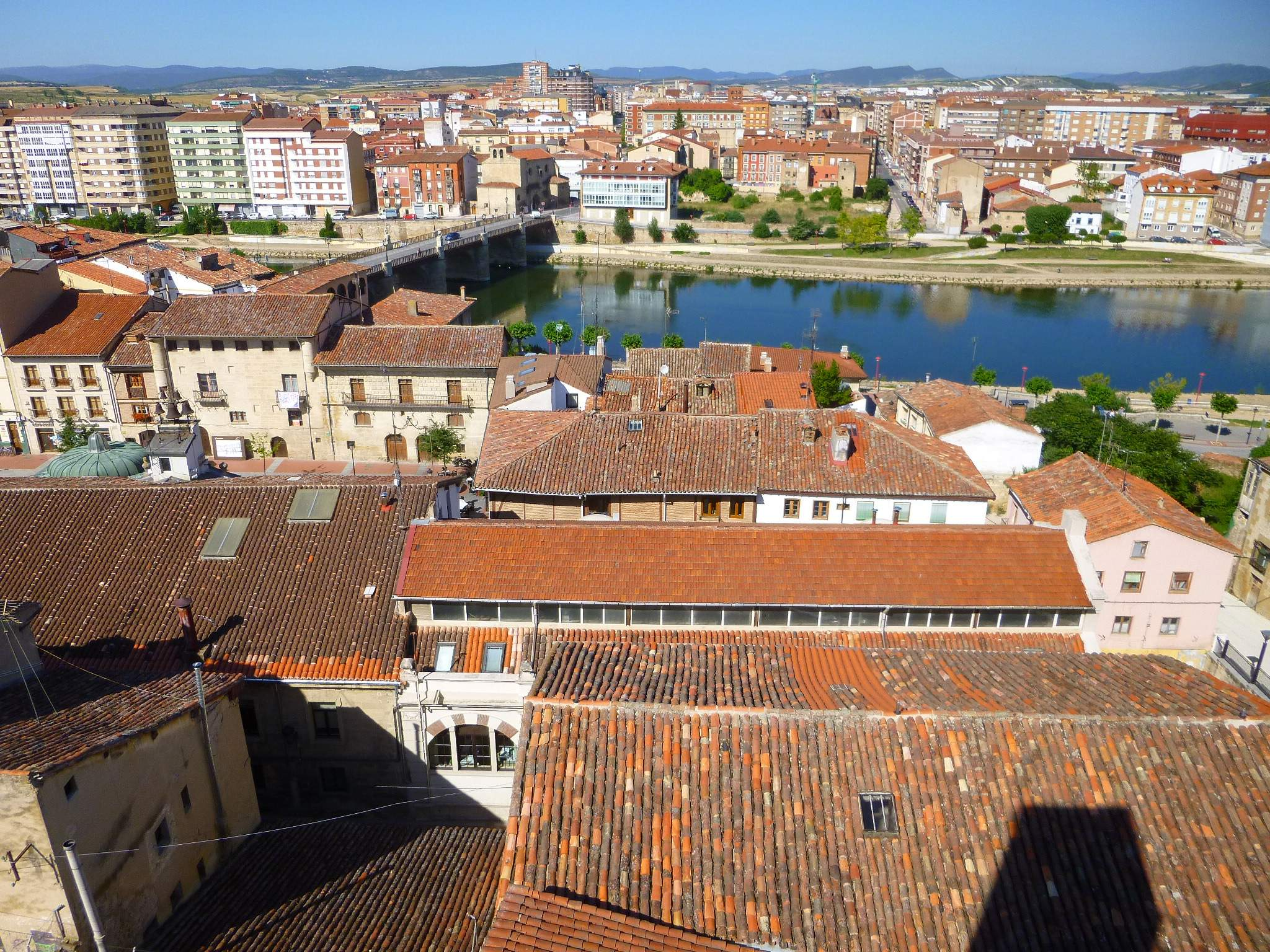

- Flag Coat of arms

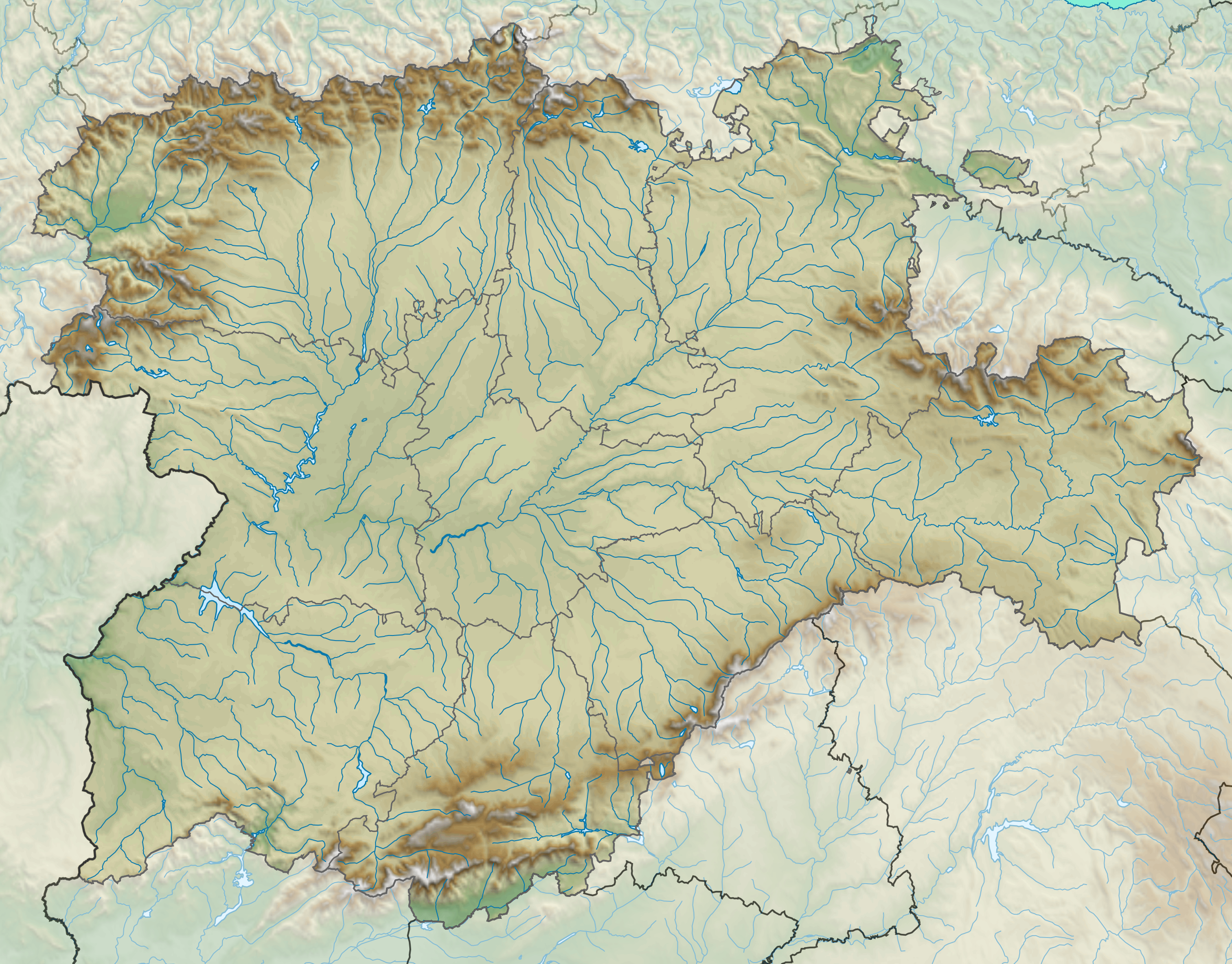
- Location within Castile and León Location within Spain
- Coordinates: 42°41′N 2°56′W
- Country: Spain
- Autonomous community: Castile and León
- Province: Burgos

Government
  - Type: Ayuntamiento
  - Body: Ayuntamiento de Miranda de Ebro
  - Mayor: Aitana Hernando (2015) (PSOE)

Area
  - Total: 101.33 km^{2} (39.12 sq mi)
- Elevation: 471 m (1,545 ft)

Population (2025-01-01)
  - Total: 36,622
  - Density: 361.41/km^{2} (936.06/sq mi)
- Demonym: Mirandés -sa
- Time zone: UTC+1 (CET)
  - Summer (DST): UTC+2 (CEST)
- Postal code: 09200
- Website: Official website

Miranda de Ebro (Spanish: [miˈɾan̪da ðe ˈeβɾo]) is a Spanish municipality belonging to the province of Burgos in the autonomous community of Castile and León. Straddling the Ebro river, near its confluence with the Bayas, the city is located on the northern watershed of the Obarenes Mountains, near the border with the Basque province of Álava and the autonomous community of La Rioja. As of 2 January 2025, the municipality has a registered population of 37,138.

The city has an industrial economy focusing on the chemical industry. Connected to the Meseta Central through the Pancorbo Pass, Miranda is an important transportation hub, served by the AP-1 and AP-68 road routes and the Madrid–Hendaye and Tudela–Bilbao rail routes. Within 80 kilometres (50 miles) are the cities of Bilbao, Burgos, Logroño and Vitoria-Gasteiz.

== Geography ==
The city of Miranda de Ebro is located in the northeastern part of the province of Burgos, 80 kilometres (50 mi) from the capital, in the autonomous community of Castile and León (Spain). The coordinates of the city are: latitude 42° 41′ 6″ N, longitude 2° 55′ 60″ W; it has an area of 101.33 square kilometres (39.12 sq mi), a perimeter of 72,312 metres (237,244 ft) and is 471 metres (1,545 ft) above sea level, according to the National Geographic Institute.

The city is divided into two parts by the river Ebro. The old part is named Aquende and the new part is named Allende.

== History ==
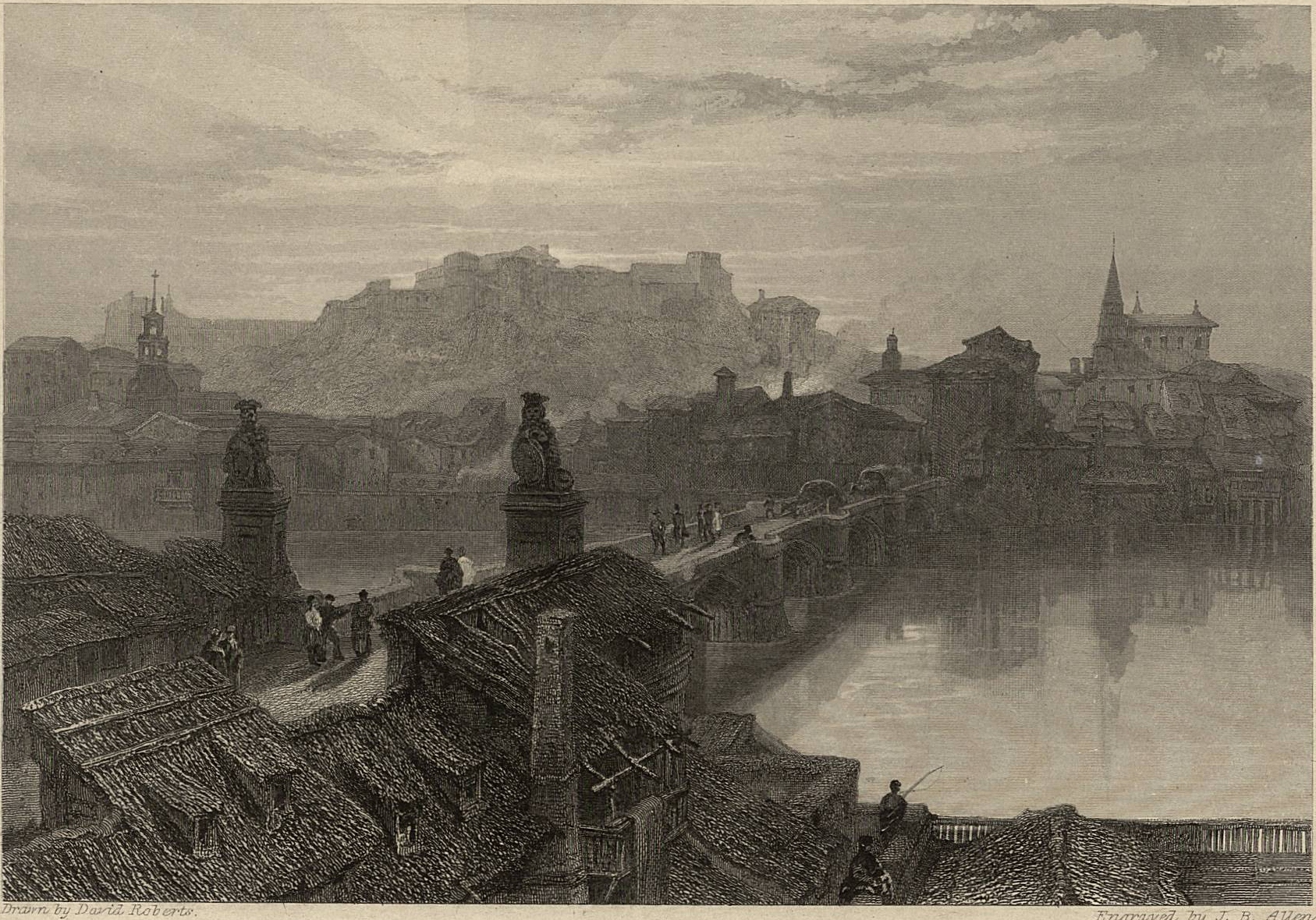
Miranda de Ebro in 1836 by David Roberts

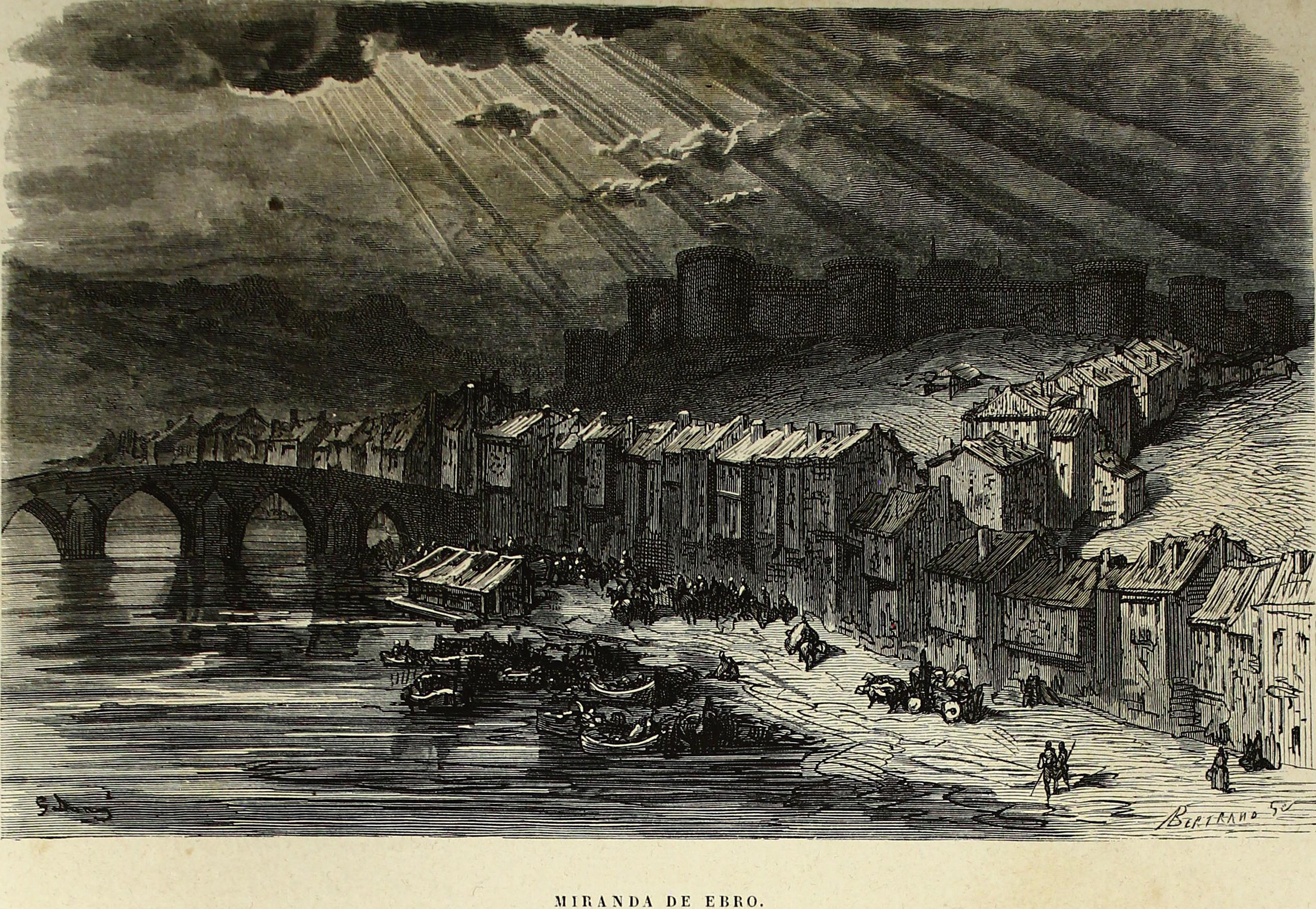
Miranda de Ebro in 1874 by baron Jean Charles Davillier and Gustave Doré

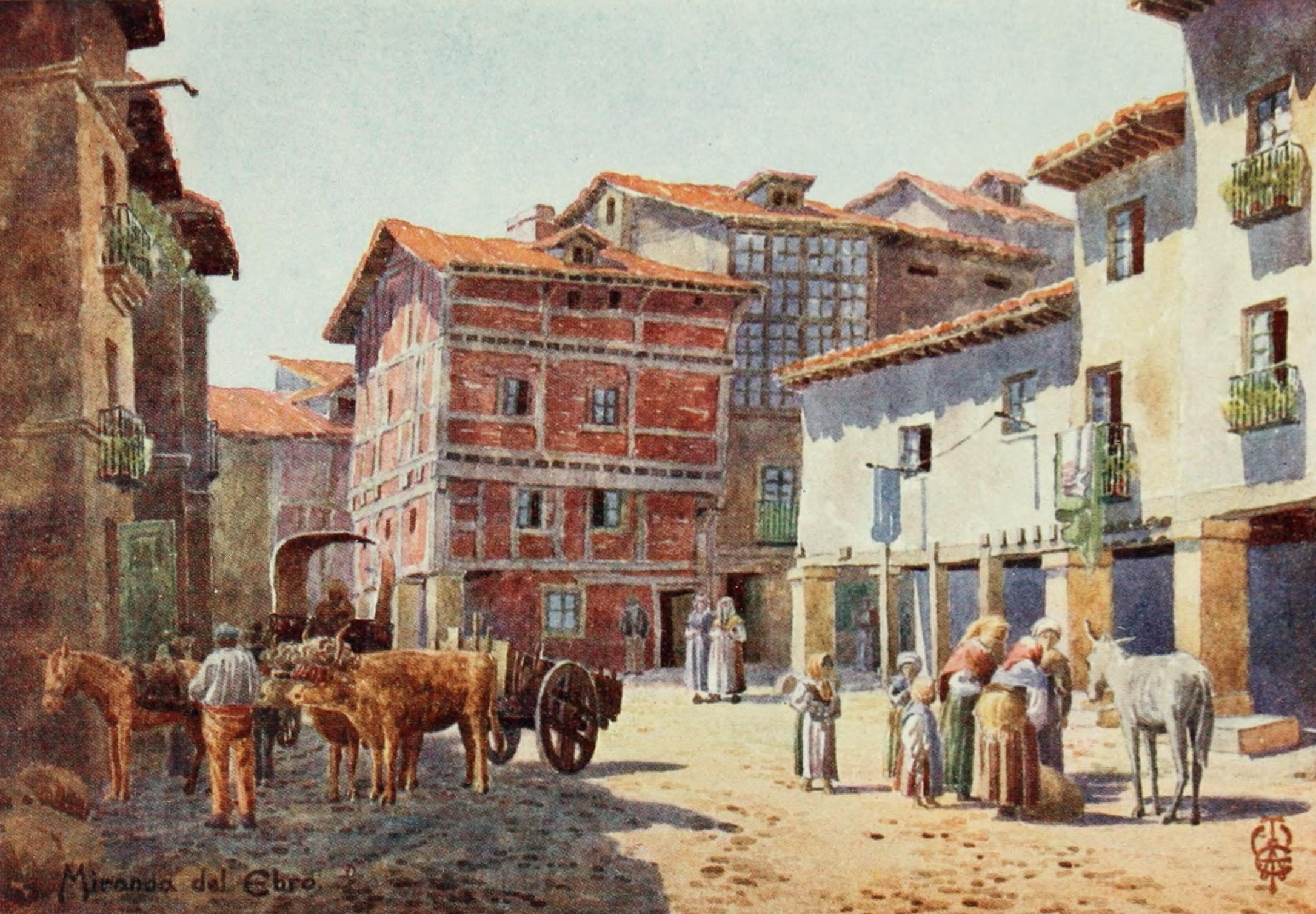
Miranda del Ebro – a corner in the town in 1906 by Edgar Thomas Ainger Wigram

The first settlements in the area date from the Iron Age. The Roman ruins of Arce are located only 3 kilometres (1.9 mi) from Miranda. There, according to the most recent studies, the Roman city of Deóbriga was built. Roman ruins are also found in the nearby municipalities of Cabriana and Puentelarrá.

The earliest mention of the name of Miranda de Ebro is in the Codex Vigilanus, which describes the famous expedition that Alfonso I of Asturias undertook in 757. This codex discusses destroyed localities, one of which was Miranda.

After the assassination of Sancho Garcés IV of Navarre, Vizcaya, Álava, La Rioja and the royal family, Alfonso VI of Castile and Leon was recognized as king. This event passed Miranda de Ebro into the hands of the Kingdom of Castile in 1076. To consolidate his power, Alfonso VI granted the fuero of Miranda de Ebro in 1099.

In 1254, Alfonso X of Castile granted the May fair, consolidating commerce, and in 1332 Alfonso XI of Castile granted the March fair. The possession of a bridge over the Ebro since at least the 10th century, together with the concession of the fuero, have made Miranda de Ebro a great commercial center in the region since ancient times. During the 14th and 15th centuries, and after the disputes between Peter of Castile and Henry of Trastámara, the town of Miranda would pass from hand to hand, first to the domain of Burgos, then to the Álava Hermandad and ultimately once again to Burgos in 1493, where it has remained to the present day.

The arrival of the railway in 1862 marked the beginning of the industrial revolution in the city. The junction of the lines from Madrid to Irun and Castejón to Bilbao was at Miranda railway station, making it the most important rail junction in northern Spain.

In 1907, King Alfonso XIII granted city status to Miranda.

During the Spanish Civil War and World War II, the city was the location of a Nationalist concentration camp that remained active until 1947, and was the last camp to close down. During its existence, it held more than 65,000 prisoners, both Spanish and foreign. World War II Czechoslovak fighter pilot ace František Fajtl was held here as a POW for two months in 1942.

Since 1992, Vierzon (France) has been the twin city of Miranda de Ebro. In 1999, a celebration to commemorate the Ninth Centenary of the Fuero of Miranda took place in the presence of Infanta Doña Cristina and her husband Don Iñaki de Urdangarín.

== Politics ==
The mayoress of the city is Aitana Hernando, member of the Spanish Socialist Workers' Party (PSOE). The People's Party (PP) and the United Left Party (IU) have minority representation. Another local party is Izquierda Mirandesa.

Group	Leader	Seats	Situation
Spanish Socialist Workers' Party	Aitana Hernando	10	Government
People's Party	Borja Suárez	7	Opposition
United Left	Guillermo Ubieto	2	Opposition
Miranda Can (Podemos)	María Esperanza Muñoz	1	Opposition
Let's Win Miranda (Mirandese left/Equo)	José Ignacio Redondo	1	Opposition

== Economy and demographics ==
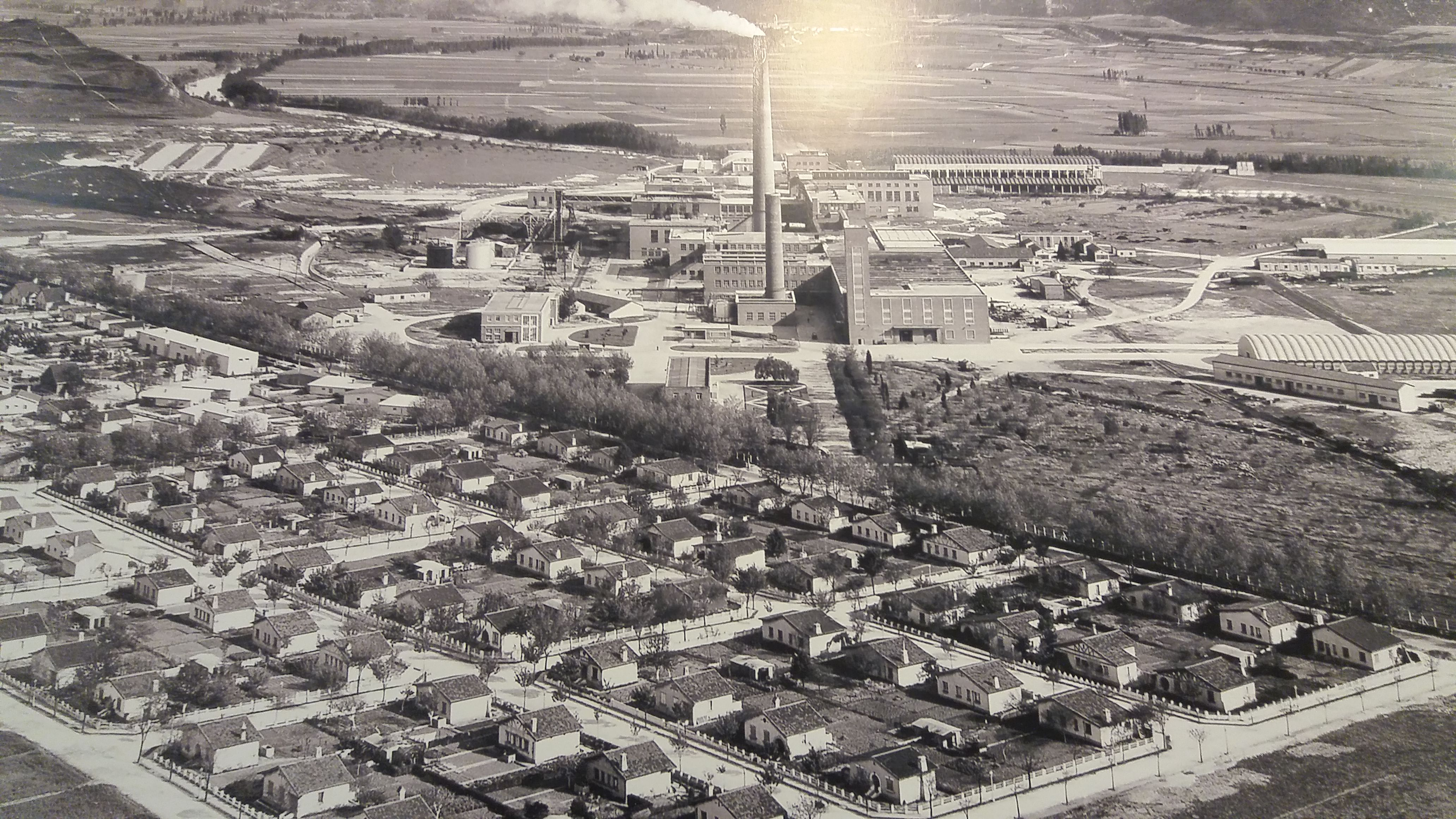
Paper mill in Miranda de Ebro

The primary sector is disappearing; nevertheless the cultivation of grain still remains the primary activity of the region. Others, like irrigated farming and viticulture, are of lesser importance. In the past cattle and horses were important as demonstrated by the fairs that have taken place since the 16th century in March and May. Mining also has its place; there are limestone quarries on the outskirts of the city.

The secondary sector is developed thanks to its excellent geographic situation, next to the Basque Country and La Rioja, making Miranda de Ebro a city with a strong industrial and logistic character. The industrial revolution of the city began with the arrival of the railway in 1862. In the first half of the 20th century a sugar plant was the first big industry in the city (1925). Later on, FEFASA (1948) was created for the production of paper products. In the middle of the 20th century many chemical industries proliferated like Montefibre, ELF-Atochem, Rests, etc. The nuclear power station of Santa Maria de Garoña is located nearby.

In 1969 the first industrial estate of Bayas was conceived, but not until 1981 were various businesses established. It marked the beginning of many projects for the industrial and commercial development of the city. Other companies in the region produce food, aeronautical, iron and steel products.

Traditional commerce has made way for new enterprises for business and leisure. Companies like E.Leclerc, Inditex, Eroski, Mercadona and others have settled in the city. No commercial center exists and the commerce of Miranda is harmed due to the competition generated from nearby Vitoria.

The last data gathered by the INE (2008) indicate that Miranda de Ebro has a population of 39,586 inhabitants. After a gradual reduction of population during the 1990s, Miranda has gained inhabitants each year due in part to arrivals from neighboring Álava in search of cheap housing. There has also been an increase in the immigrant population (10.8% of the total).

== Transport ==
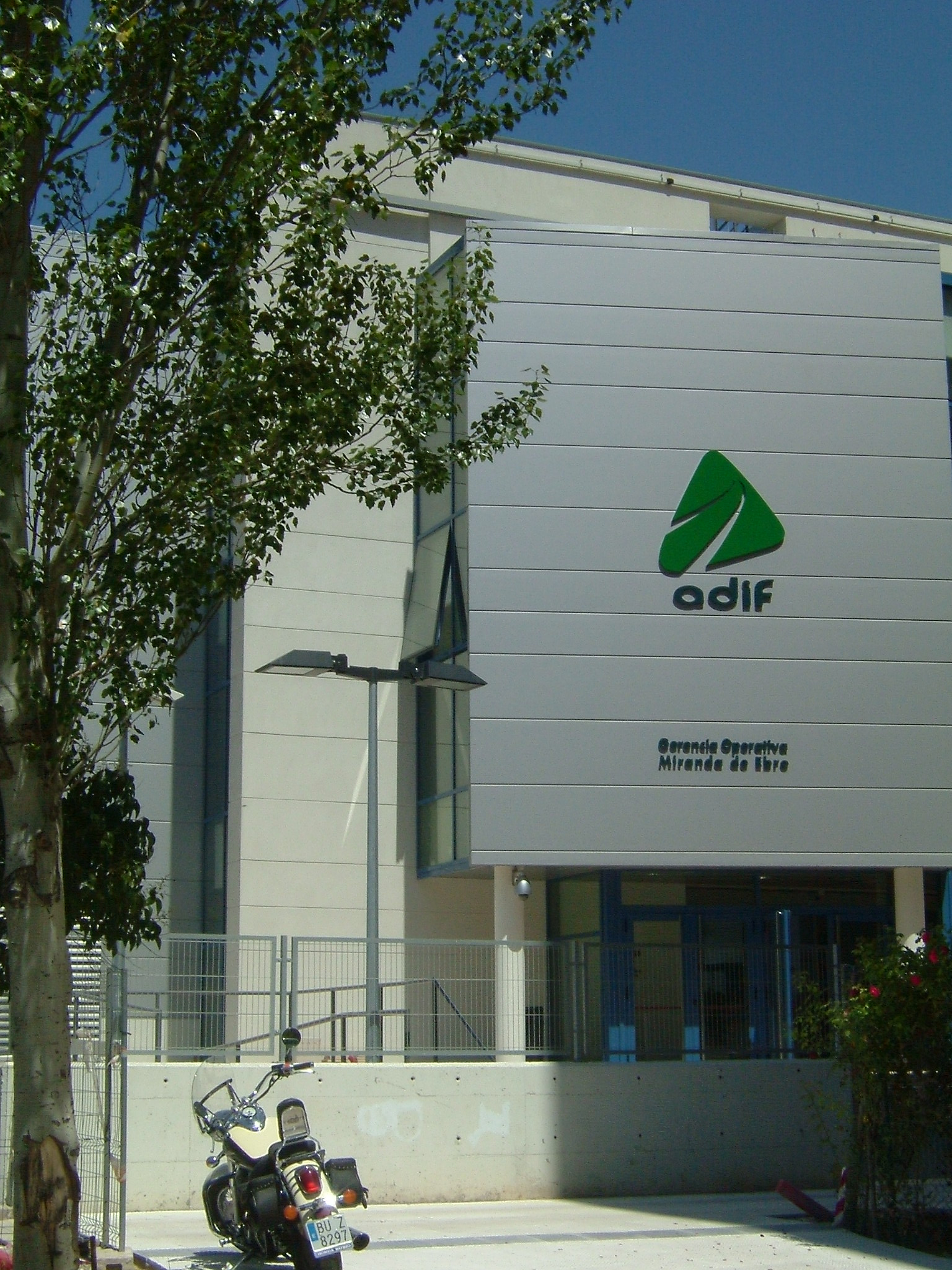
Railway control center in Miranda de Ebro

Its geographic location straddling the northern plateau of Ebro Valley and Basque territory makes Miranda de Ebro an important transport hub, especially for rail traffic.

=== Intercity transport ===
Numerous national roads, highways or dual carriageways (autovías), and motorways or freeways (autopistas) pass through the city, connecting it with all the surrounding major cities. A project is underway to construct a new highway and a new freeway originating in the city. The first, A-68 or Autovía del Ebro (Ebro Highway), will connect Miranda to Aragón via the Ebro valley. The second, AP-69 or Autopista Dos Mares (Two Seas Freeway), will connect Miranda to the Cantabrian coastal plain via the Merindades.

The Miranda de Ebro railway station is considered first class within the national rankings. Two lines, Madrid–Hendaye railway and Casetas–Bilbao railway, converge there. Since December 2007 the city has been connected to the main provincial capitals by the high-speed Alvia service. It also possesses an important distribution hub in its Merchandise Classification and numerous RENFE (Note: Red Nacional de los Ferrocarriles Españoles, Spanish National Railway Network) shops. The ADIF (Note: Administrador de Infraestructuras Ferroviarias, Railway Infrastructure Administration) command post, which is in charge of traffic control for the whole of northern Spain, is located in Miranda's railway facilities.

The Miranda de Ebro bus station is located on Railway Circle in the city centre, a few metres from the station. It was opened in November 2012. There are departures to Madrid, Burgos, San Sebastián, Bilbao, Logroño & frequently to Vitoria-Gasteiz.

Although Miranda de Ebro has no airport of its own, Vitoria Airport is located only 35 kilometres (22 miles) away in Vitoria, which can be reached in under half an hour by the A-1 highway. Other airports near the city include Bilbao Airport, Burgos Airport, and Logroño-Agoncillo Airport.

=== Local transport ===
A fleet of buses operate a single route between the hospital and El Lago, though two new lines are expected in 2009.

Miranda de Ebro also has its own fleet of taxis covering services to Vitoria and Plaza de la Estación. In recent years the city has been creating a network of bicycle lanes expected to extend 27 kilometres (17 miles) and, since September 2008, the city has provided a bike rental service, Biciudad Miranda, similar to those of other major cities.

== Main sights ==
=== Civil structures ===
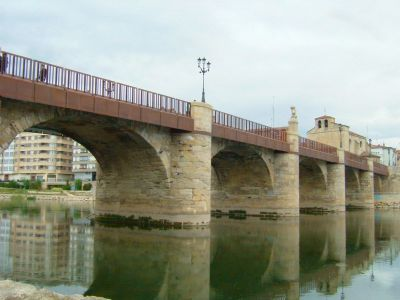
Carlos III Bridge (1777)

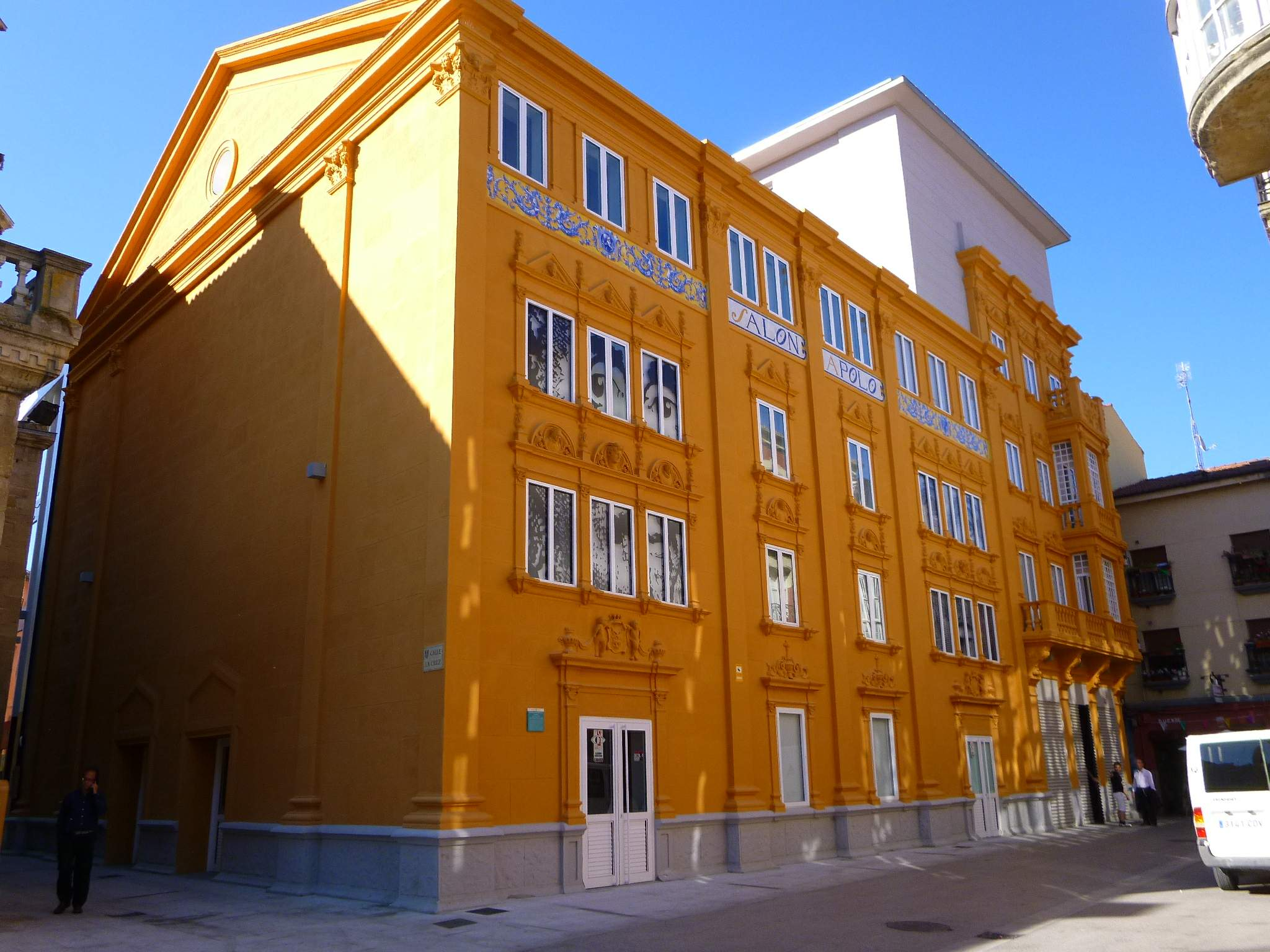
Apolo Theatre (1921)

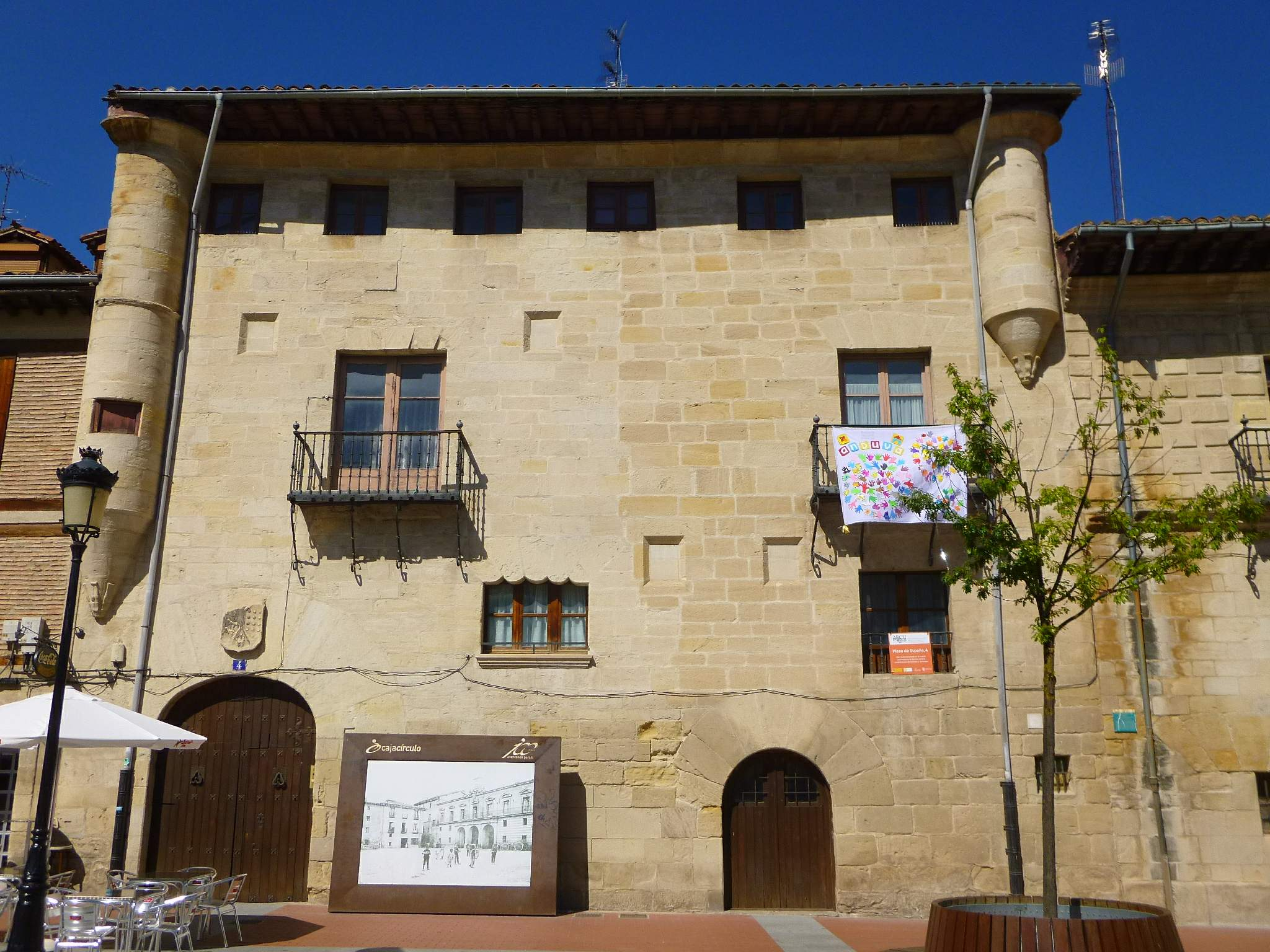
Casa de los Urbina

- Carlos III Bridge. Constructed in 1777 under the direction of Francisco Alejo of Aranguren, it consists of 6 arches and includes jetties at each end to reduce the impact of the waves. Since 1786 two lions have guarded the bridge, the work of sculptor Juan Antonio de Moraza; one of them clutches the royal shield and the other that of the city.
- The present City Hall has stood in the Plaza de España since 1778. This building is also the work of Francisco Alejo of Aranguren and was modified by Ventura Rodríguez. The building is in the neoclassic style, constructed of pillowed masonry blocks and finished with triangular and semicircular bays.
- Castle of Miranda de Ebro, of which only a few walls remain. Built in the 14th century by Count Don Tello, it remained in operation until the Carlist Wars of the nineteenth century. In the early twentieth century it was dismantled and filled in with earth, and many of its stones were used to build the now defunct bullfighting arena.
- Several mansions dot the old town of Miranda de Ebro. The impressive House of Chains (Casa de las Cadenas) of the sixteenth century hosted Joseph, brother of Napoleon Bonaparte and King Ferdinand VII of Spain, who in 1828 installed the chains as a memento of their stay. Another remarkable building is the Urbina House (Casa de los Urbina), also of the sixteenth century, with its protruding defensive turrets. It hosted King Philip IV of Spain on his journey to France, and Margarita of Savoy, Vicereine of Portugal, who died there in 1655.
- Railway Station, built in 1862 by English architect Charles Vignoles, one of the oldest stations in northern Spain. It houses the junction of the Madrid–Irun and Castejón–Bilbao lines. Its remarkable Victorian-style iron porticos were cast in London's Frederick Braby foundries.
- Apollo Theatre, constructed in 1921; it was designed by Riojan architect Fermin Alamo. Its historicist decorations, such as its busts erected on the windows and its ornamental plants, are outstanding. The adjoining building is in the same style and will be joined to the theater after renovation.
- La Picota. Sculpted in 1569 by local master Maese Miguel Aguirre, this is the village rollo, a stone pillar symbolizing judicial power in times past.
- Plaza de Abastos, dedicated in 1917 in the heart of the city. Noted for its solidness of construction and authentic Islamic appointments.
- Old Convent of the Three Kings Augustinian Recollects. In 1911 the Troconiz family built a northern style chalet, later selling it to Three Kings Augustinian Recollects, who in 1950 extended it with a chapel of similar style. It features a pyramidal tower and pillowed stone façade. It has belonged to the Government of Castile and León since 1998.

=== Religious structures ===
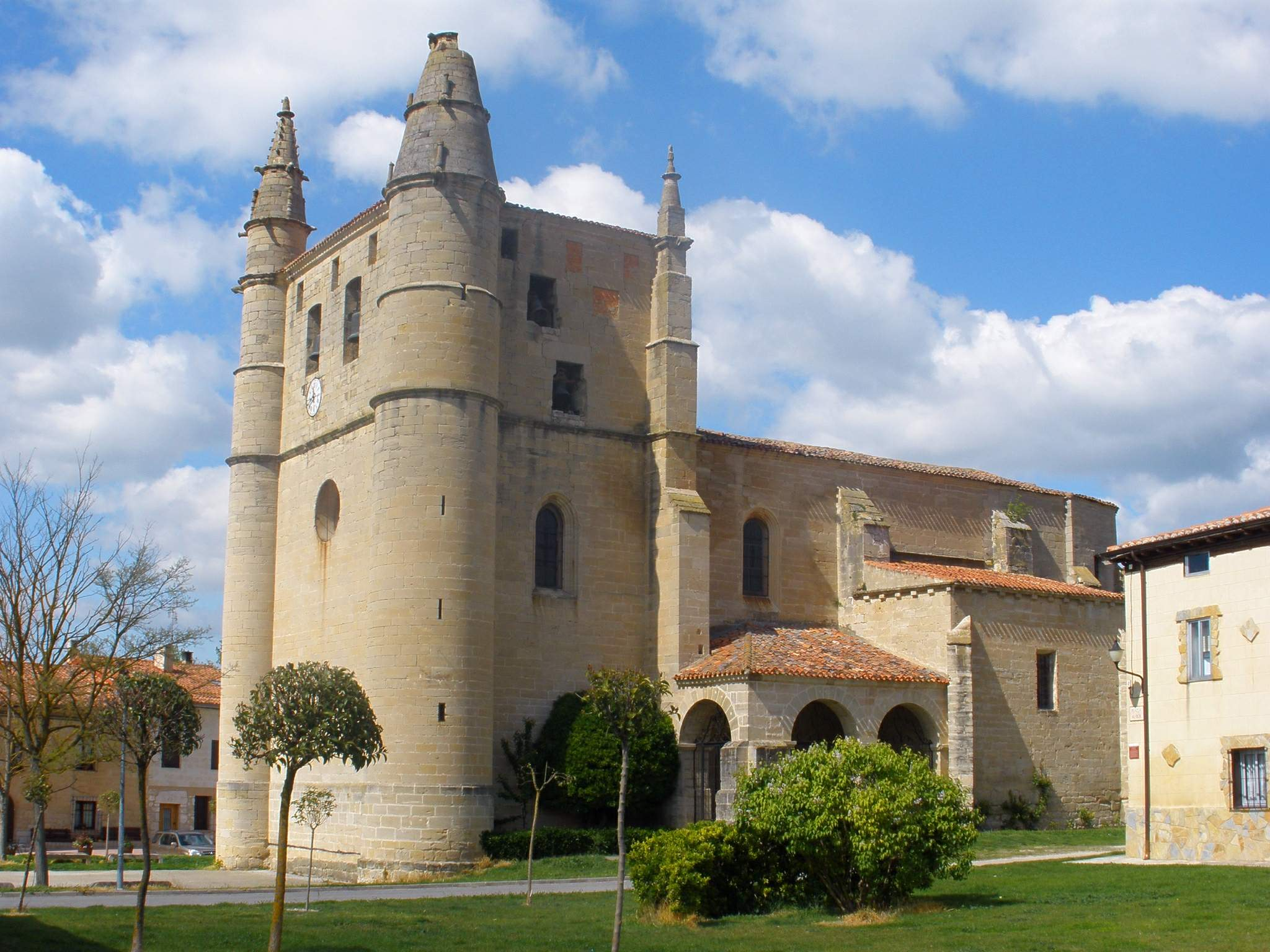
San Esteban Church.

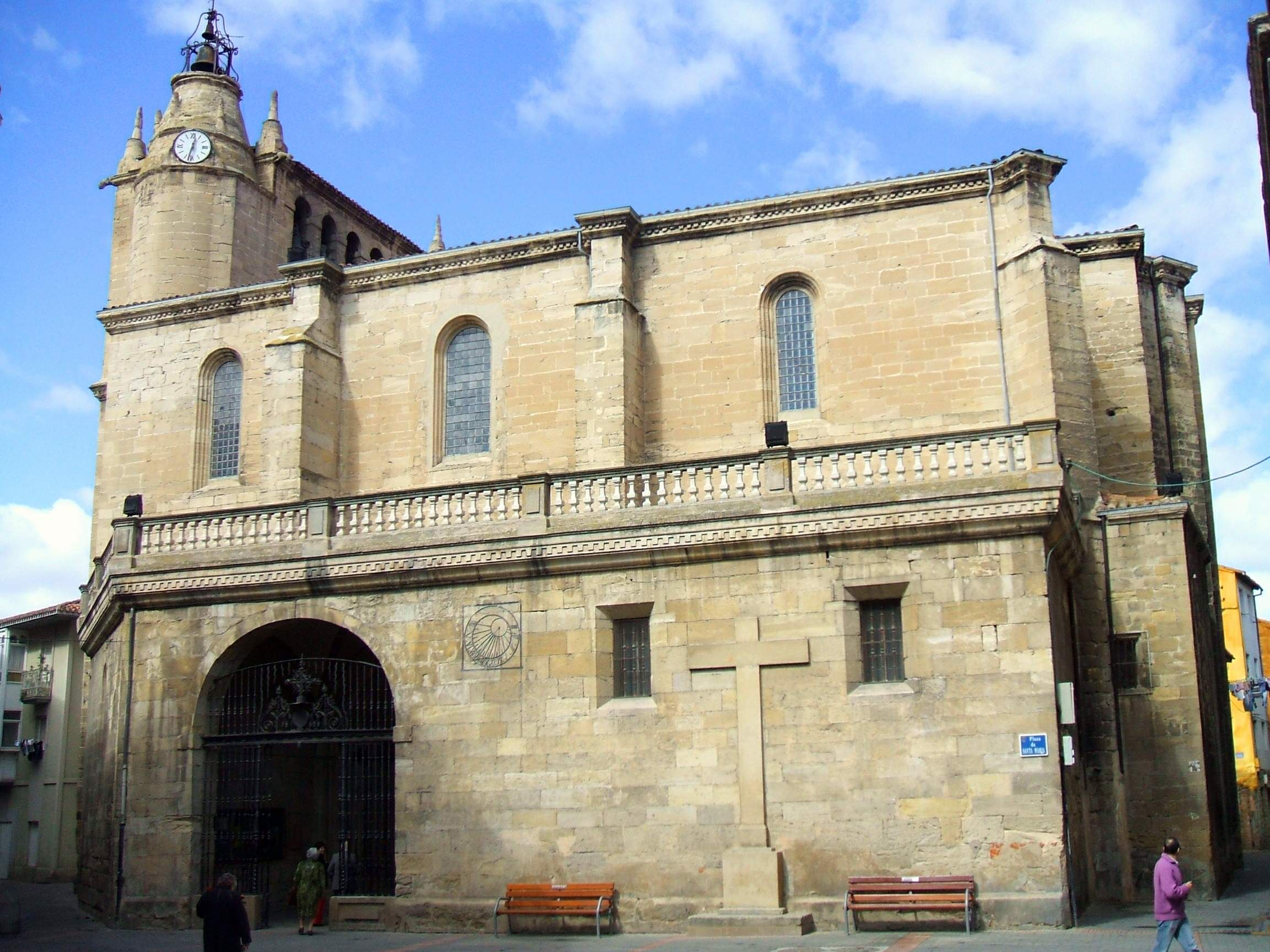
Santa María church

- Church of the Holy Spirit. Known in antiquity under the name of its patron Saint Nicholas, this Roman-style temple is mentioned in the 1099 Miranda Charter. Its façade and apse date from the 13th century, and its small Gothic nave from the sixteenth. It suffered major damage before the Spanish Civil War (May 1936), and has been called by its present name since being renovated.
- Saint Mary's Church, built in the 16th century in Late Gothic-Renaissance. In its interior lies the mummified body of Pascual Martinez, known as "El Chantre" ("The Cantor").
- Church of the Sacred Hearts. Located in the historic convent of San Francisco, the church was built in the sixteenth century. It is noted for its baroque-style steeple, built in 1693.
- Old Church of Saint John, in ruins since 1875. Nevertheless, in its interior are preserved the principal naves decorated in colors, the baptismal font, and the compound ogive windows.
- St. Nicholas's Church. Built in 1945, its construction project came in second in the National Architecture Competition that year. It includes three basilica-type naves, an apse, and a large rose window in its façade. Its interior features large tapestries painted by Manuel Navarro and his brother, hung from the apse wall.

=== Parks and gardens ===
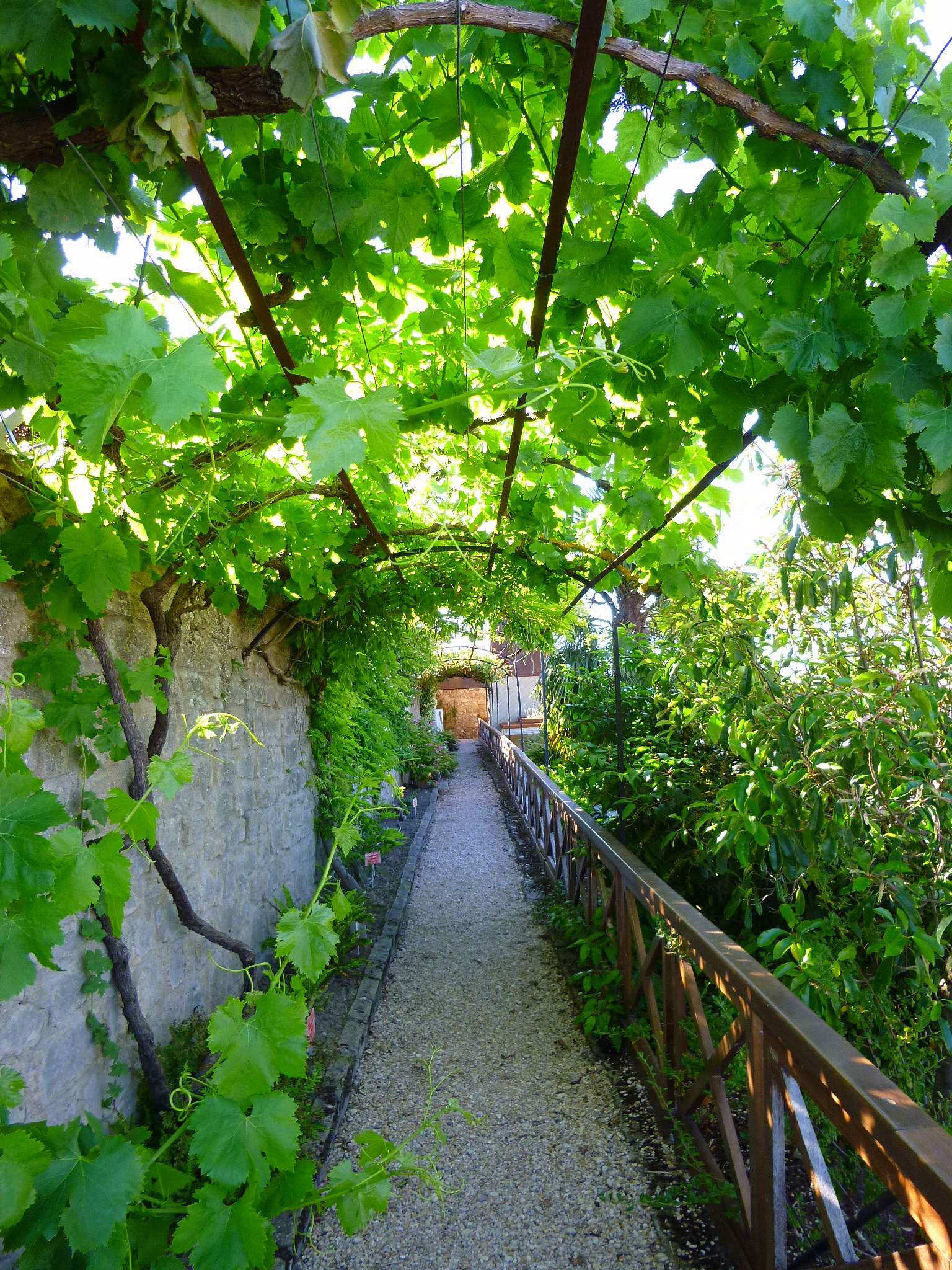
Botanical garden of Miranda de Ebro.

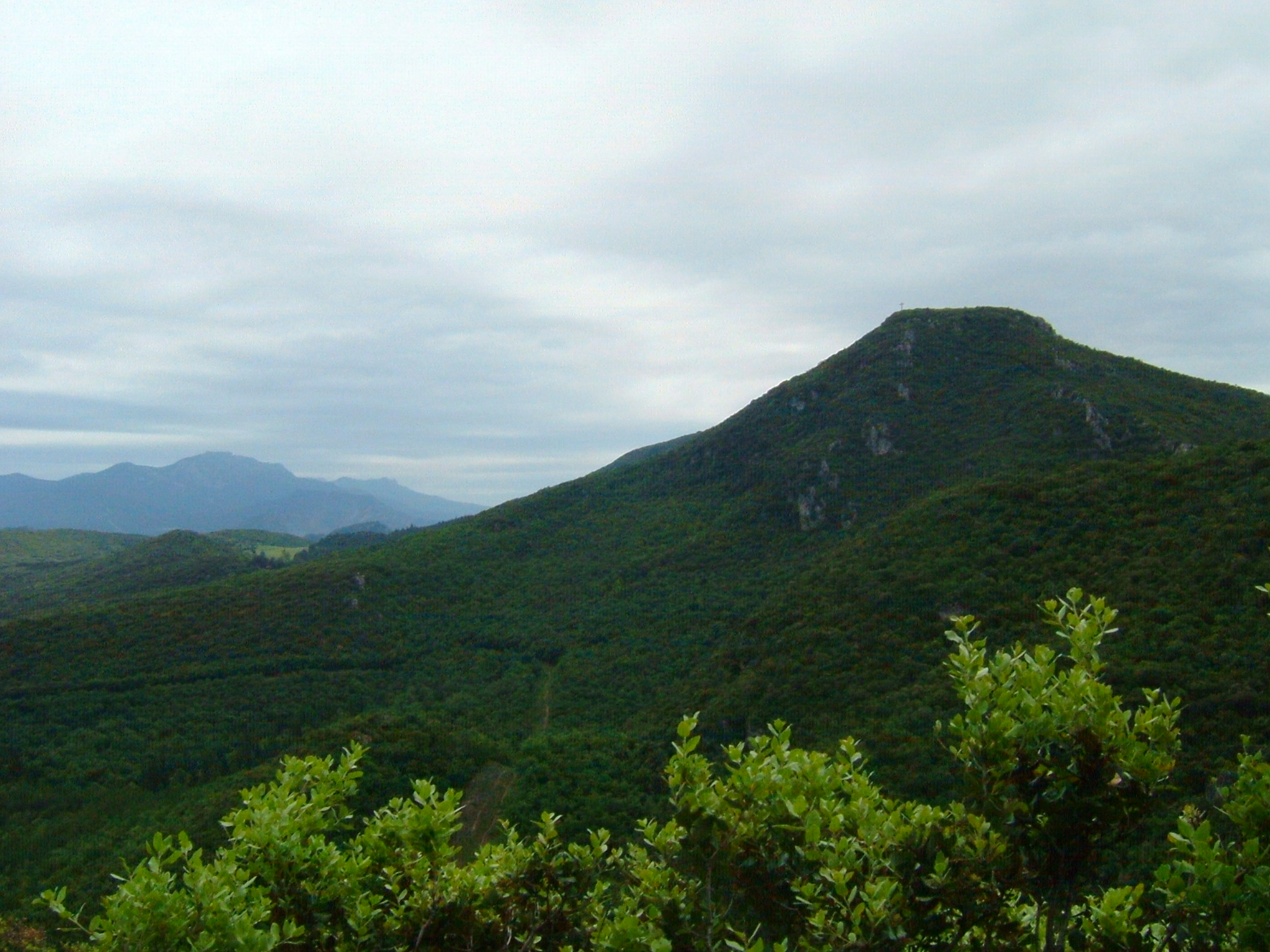
Miranda de Ebro y Ameyugo mountains

Miranda de Ebro has not historically been known for having many areas of greenery within the city, but in recent years a series of parks and gardens have been created to correct this shortcoming. In January 2009 the city had 646,377 square meters of green areas, amounting to 16.35 square meters per inhabitant.

- Antonio Machado Park, built in 1915, is the centermost park in Miranda de Ebro and has an area of 12,500 square meters. The park combines two very different styles: While its central crossing, with its embankments and wide paths, is clearly of French style the four gardens in its corners stand out for their stately tall trees and great expanses of lawn typical of English parks. In 1927 a kiosk was erected in the middle of the park, which three years later would be covered with a cupola designed by Fermin Alamo. Also found in the park are monuments to the Municipal Band, to Francisco Cantera, and to the ninth centennial of the Miranda Charter.
- Miranda de Ebro Botanical Garden, adjacent to the old convent of the Servants of Jesus in the historical district, covers some 2,400 square meters of terraces on the slopes of La Picota. The garden houses 700 distinct species identified by common name, scientific name, variety, family, and place of origin.

== Sports ==
The town of Miranda de Ebro features most of its sports facilities in Anduva Municipal MultiSports (Polideportivo Municipal de Anduva), which contains tennis courts, a covered court, a heated pool, outdoor pools, multi-sport fields, a gymnasium, a running track, and soccer pitches with both natural and artificial grass. Other sporting facilities in the city include Anduva Municipal Stadium (Estadio Municipal de Anduva) (soccer), La Charca facility, José García facility, the Multifunction Pavilion, and the Ebro Pavilion. The city also has a kart racing track, a motocross track, and a model airplane field.

=== Sports clubs ===
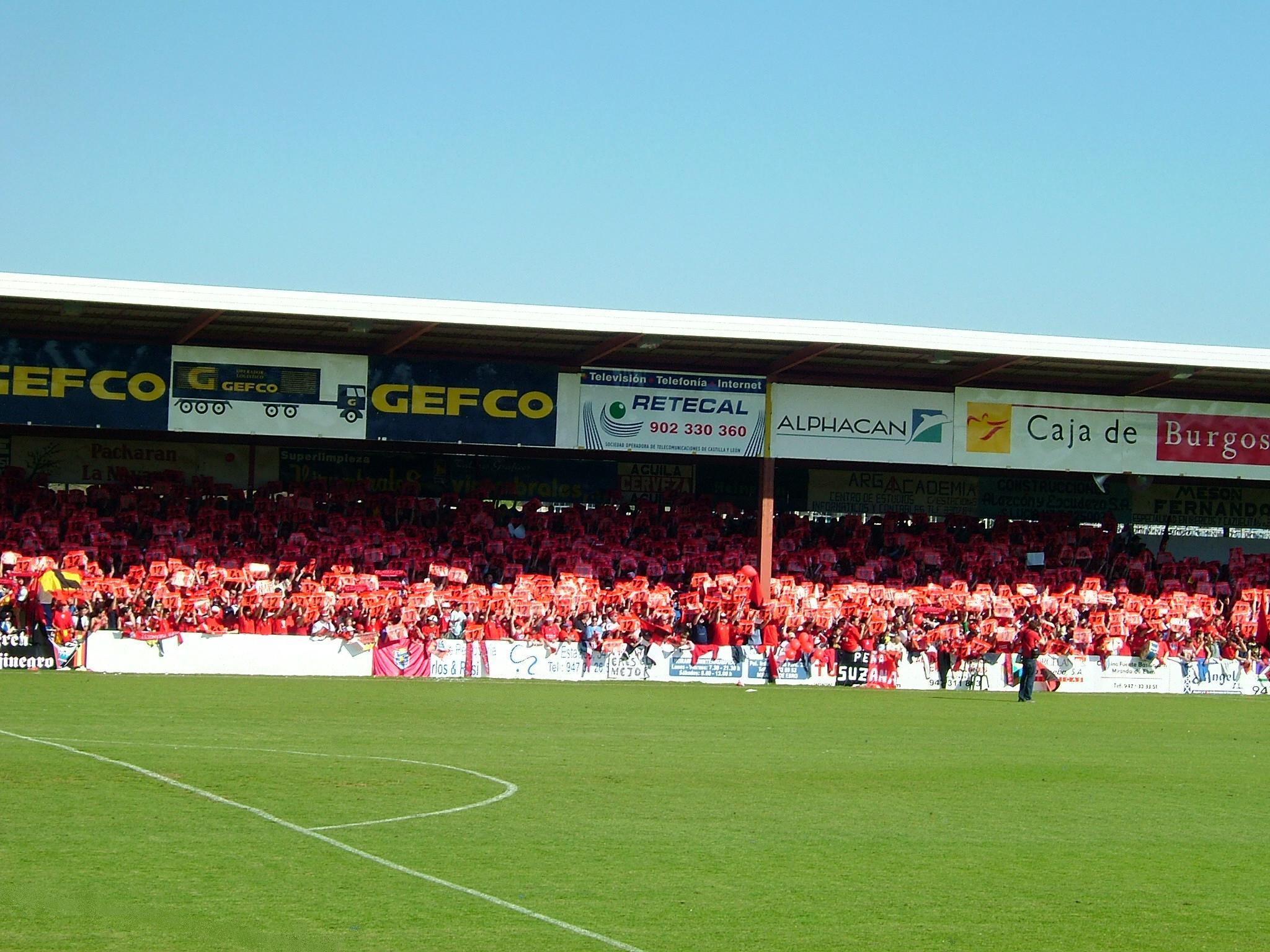
Anduva Municipal Stadium

- Club Deportivo Mirandés (or simply "Mirandés") is an association football team founded in 1927. Mirandés competes in the Spanish second division and has its home ground at the Anduva Municipal Stadium. Its supporters are known as the "marea rojilla", or "red tide".
- Club Voley Miranda was a volleyball club that currently competes in the Women's Superleague 2.

=== Sporting events ===
- Cross National Prince of Spain
- Motos concentration
- Vuelta a Burgos

== Celebrations and events ==
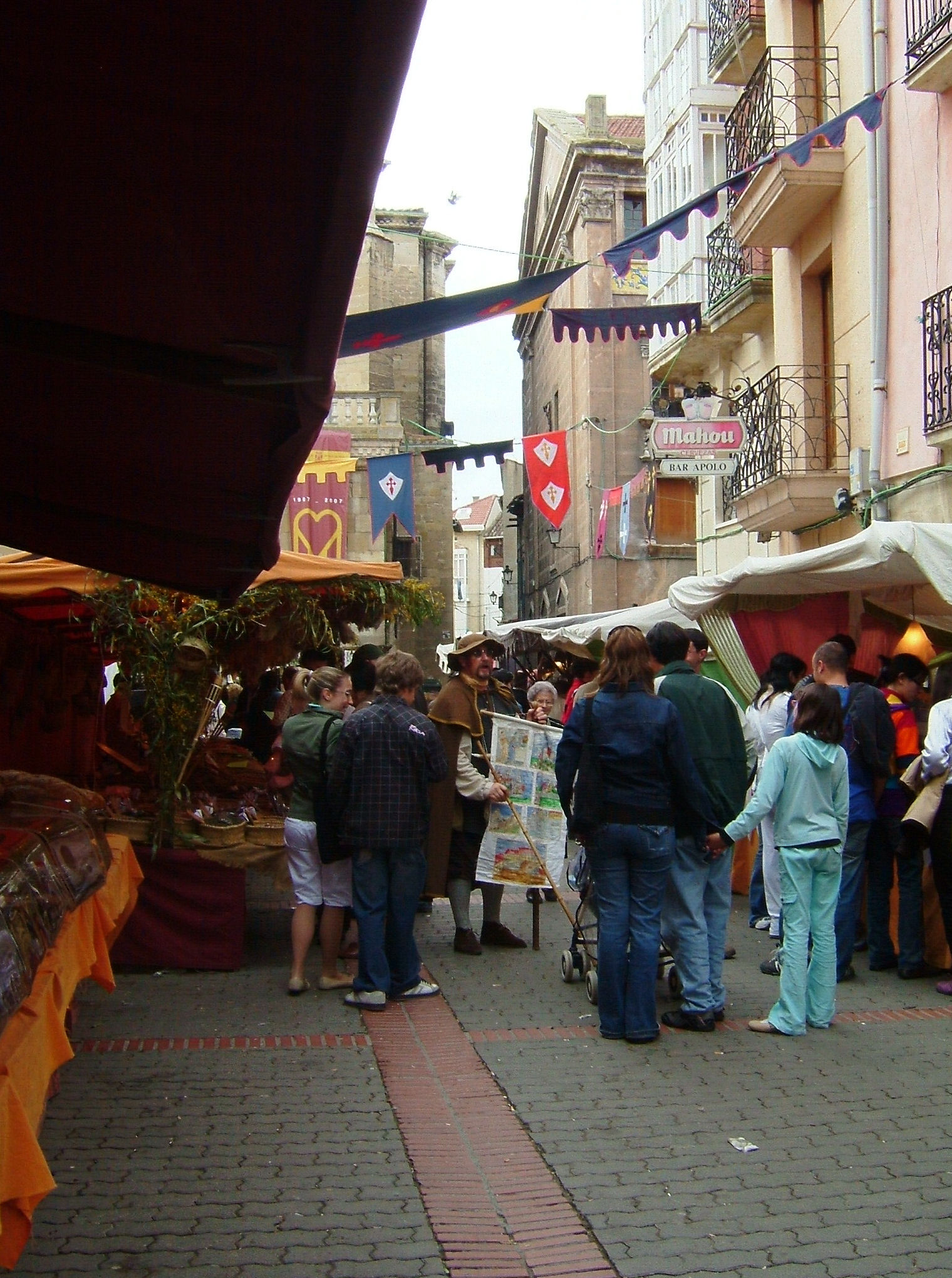
Mediaeval Market

There are many celebrations and fairs held in Miranda de Ebro throughout the year. The first event of the year is the March Fair or Fair of the Angel, which is celebrated on 1 March and whose origin dates back to the 14th century. The first weekend of May is the May Fair, which has coincided since 1997 with the Medieval market.

The main celebration in Miranda de Ebro is the Saint John of the Mountain Festival, which is held on the Monte de San Juan and celebrated on the Whit Monday. This celebration has a procession which is considered the best in Northern Spain. In addition, 12 September is the day of the city's patron, the Virgin of Altamira. This event contains float competitions, concerts and a firework display.

== Education ==
- Colegio Sagrados Corazones
- Urban planning of Miranda de Ebro

== Twin towns – sister cities ==
- Vierzon, France
