= Izquierda Mirandesa =

Mirandese Left Izquierda Mirandesa
- Leader: Antonio Salazar Chomón; Conchi Salazar
- Founded: 1983
- Merger of: Local section of the Workers' Party; Independents
- Headquarters: C/Los Hornos nº 30, 09200, Miranda de Ebro
- Ideology: Revolutionary socialism Left-wing Nationalism; Abertzale left Basque independence Feminism; Ecosocialism
- Local Council of Miranda: 0 / 21

Izquierda Mirandesa (IM) is a Spanish political party from the city of Miranda de Ebro (province of Burgos). The actual leader of the party is Conchi Salazar.

== Ideology ==
The ideology of the party is the left-wing Basque nationalism. Miranda de Ebro is now part of the province of Burgos, but, according to the party, the city should be part of Álava and therefore Euskadi.

== History ==
The party was created by ex-members of the Workers' Party in 1983.

This party did not participate in the 2007 local elections in Miranda de Ebro, but they advised the people from the city living in places where another party, Basque Nationalist Action (ANV), was going to participate, they should vote for them. In the local elections of 2015 the party gained one town councillor within the coalition of Ganemos Miranda which obtained 6.16% of the vote. In the following elections they lost representation.
