= Faith Esham =

American opera singer

Faith Esham (born August 6, 1948) is an American soprano and college professor of voice.

== Life and career ==
Faith Lou Esham was born in Portsmouth, Ohio, and grew up in Vanceburg, Kentucky, the daughter of Dr. Elwood Esham (1905–1985) and Ruth Louise Opfer Esham (1917–2010), a nurse. She graduated in psychology from Columbia Union College in Maryland. She completed study for a master's degree in clinical psychology at Eastern Kentucky University before transferring to the Juilliard School where she received her master's degree in music in 1978. Her voice teacher at Juilliard was Beverley Peck Johnson.

Esham has sung many roles in opera houses in the United States and Europe. She debuted at the Metropolitan Opera as Marzelline in Fidelio; she returned there to cover the roles of Nedda in Pagliacci and of Mélisande in Pelléas et Mélisande. Additional roles are: Mimì and Melisande with the Lyric Opera of Chicago, Pamina in Washington, D.C., Micaëla and Juliette in Cincinnati, the heroines in Les contes d'Hoffmann, Manon and Gilda in Pittsburgh, Manon, Cendrillon, Marguerite, Leila, Baby Doe, Ännchen, Gilda, and Floyd's Susannah at New York City Opera. As Micaëla, she sang opposite Plácido Domingo and Julia Migenes in the 1984 film Carmen, whose soundtrack won a 1985 Grammy award. She also sang Cherubino and Marzelline at La Scala. She sang Micaëla at the Vienna State Opera and the Opera de Caracas; Marzelline and Cendrillon at Paris' Théâtre du Châtelet, Musetta at Cologne Opera, Germany, Marguerite at the New Israeli Opera, Mélisande in Geneva and numerous roles in six seasons with the Santa Fe Opera. She appeared as Susanna and Cherubino in The Marriage of Figaro at Glyndebourne.

In 2000, she joined the faculty of Westminster Choir College of Rider University, where she was an adjunct assistant professor of voice until 2024.

== Selected discography ==
- Carmen – Micaela (1984) (movie soundtrack album, winner of the 1985 Grammy Award for Best Opera Recording)
- The Marriage of Figaro – Cherubino (EMI)
- The Songs of Charles W. Griffes (Musical Heritage Society)

== Television ==
- Pagliacci – Nedda (1981)
- Gianni Schicchi – Lauretta (1981)
- Live from Lincoln Center
  - New York City Opera: The Magic Flute – Pamina (1987)
  - New York City Opera: Rigoletto – Gilda (1988)

== Film ==
- Carmen (1984) - soundtrack won 1985 Grammy Award for Best Opera Recording

== Awards ==
- Walter W. Naumburg Award
- Concours international de chant de Paris
