= State of the Art (book) =

1985 book by Pauline Kael

- Author: Pauline Kael
- Publication date: 1985
- ISBN: 0-525-24369-0

State of the Art: Film Writings 1983–1985 is the eighth collection of movie reviews by the American critic Pauline Kael.

In the Author's Note at the beginning of this collection she wrote:

"The title of this book is a deliberate break with my sexually tinged titles of the past. It seemed time for a change; this has not been a period for anything like Grand Passions. I hope that State of the Art will sound ominous and sweeping and just slightly clinical. What I try to get at in this collection of reviews from June 1983 to July 1985 is the state of the art of moviemaking. And despite the dubious state of the art[..]there has always been something to recommend."

Kael reviews 117 films in this eighth collection. She gives rich praise to the work of performers and directors she admires, for example, Molly Ringwald's performance in Sixteen Candles, - Steve Martin, Robin Williams, and Nick Nolte, ( three perennial Kael favourites), and Luchino Visconti, for his work on The Leopard - "The Leopard is so beautifully felt that it calls up a whole culture. It casts an intelligent spell - intelligent and rapturous." (Though Visconti's film had originally been released in 1963, Kael is here reviewing the release of a full length three hours and five minutes version). And she's typically cool to work she regards as second rate; 'When you come out of Desperately Seeking Susan, you don't want to know who the director is - you want to know who the perpetrator is.' And Steven Spielberg's segment of Twilight Zone: The Movie - a, " lump of ironclad whimsy. It's as if Steven Spielberg had sat down and thought out what he could do that would make his detractors happiest." And Sylvester Stallone's work on Staying Alive; "What can be done about this mock writer-director-producer-actor? He has become the stupidos' Orson Welles."

Films she recommends in this eighth collection include The Survivors, The Grey Fox, The Leopard, Under Fire, Heart Like a Wheel, Yentl, Choose Me, Splash, Moscow on the Hudson, Indiana Jones and the Temple of Doom, Repo Man, Dreamscape, Carmen, Utu, Stop Making Sense, A Soldier's Story, Comfort and Joy, Independence Day, Mrs. Soffel, A Passage to India, Micki + Maude, The Makioka Sisters, The Return of the Soldier, A Private Function, The Purple Rose of Cairo, Heartbreakers, Lost in America, Ghare Baire, Prizzi's Honor, The Shooting Party.

The book is out-of-print in the United States, but is still published by Marion Boyars Publishers in the United Kingdom.

== Editions ==
- Pub: E. P. Dutton, 1985, hardcover (ISBN 0-525-24369-0)
- Pub: Plume, 1985, soft cover (ISBN 0-525-48186-9)
- Pub: Marion Boyars, 1987, hardbound (ISBN 0-7145-2869-2)
- Pub: Marion Boyars, 1998 (new ed), paperback (ISBN 0-7145-2914-1)
