= Independence Day (1983 film) =

1983 film by Robert Mandel

- Theatrical release poster
- Directed by: Robert Mandel
- Written by: Alice Hoffman
- Produced by: Robert Singer; Daniel H. Blatt
- Starring: Kathleen Quinlan; David Keith; Frances Sternhagen; Cliff DeYoung; Dianne Wiest
- Cinematography: Charles Rosher Jr.
- Edited by: Tina Hirsch; Dennis Virkler
- Music by: Charles Bernstein
- Production company: Warner Bros.
- Distributed by: Warner Bros.
- Release date: January 21, 1983
- Running time: 110 minutes
- Country: United States
- Language: English
- Box office: $151,462 (USA)

Independence Day is a 1983 American drama film directed by Robert Mandel from a script by the novelist Alice Hoffman. It was designed by Stewart Campbell and shot by Charles Rosher. It stars Kathleen Quinlan, David Keith, Cliff DeYoung, Frances Sternhagen and Dianne Wiest.

The film concerns the small-town life of an artist (Quinlan) and her challenge to become "what she's almost sure she could be." Her desperation takes the form of affectations and pretensions that are like those of the young Katharine Hepburn in Alice Adams and the young Margaret Sullavan in The Shop Around the Corner, but the Quinlan character "has the talent driving her on past all that." Wiest plays a battered wife.

== Plot ==
In the small town of Mercury, New Mexico (the film actually was shot in Anson, Texas), where she works as a waitress in her family's diner, Mary Ann Taylor's true love is photography. She would like to get beyond these limits, but when Jack Parker returns to town, he lets her know that he's been to the big city and happiness there is as elusive as anyplace else.

Mary Ann and Jack fall in love. Their bliss is interrupted, however, by the discovery that Jack's meek sister Nancy is being physically abused by her husband Les. Jack tries to intervene but, in the end, Nancy intentionally triggers a gas explosion, killing Les and herself.

== Cast ==
- Kathleen Quinlan as Mary Ann Taylor
- David Keith as Jack Parker
- Frances Sternhagen as Carla Taylor (Mary Ann's mom)
- Josef Sommer as Sam Taylor (Mary Ann's dad)
- Dianne Wiest as Nancy Morgan (Jack's sister)
- Cliff DeYoung as Les Morgan (Nancy's husband)
- Anne Haney as Rose Parker (Jack's mom)
- Noble Willingham as Andy Parker (Jack's dad)
- Richard Farnsworth as Evan (Jack's boss)
- Bert Remsen as Red
- Brooke Alderson as Shelly
- Cheryl Smith as Ginny (Smith's final film role)
- Jeff Polk as Billy Morgan
- Zachary DeLoach as Joey Morgan

== Release ==
The film was theatrically released on October 15, 1982. Following a handful of less than ecstatic test engagements, Independence Day was quietly withdrawn from distribution as the under-performance was seen as confirmation of the doubts raised by Warner Bros. marketing division regarding the viability of the film.

By December 1984, the film appeared on HBO.

The film was released on home video on January 29, 1992.

== Reception ==
The film was reviewed favorably by the critic Pauline Kael in her collection State of the Art: "Kathleen Quinlan plays the part of the woman artist with a cool, wire-taut intensity, Robert Mandel keeps the whole cast interacting quietly and satisfyingly, Wiest has hold of an original character and plays her to the scary hilt."

A review for Variety wrote, "Despite some yeoman acting by a talented cast of character actors, the predictable and contrived storyline proves intractable."

After years only available on VHS, Independence Day got a DVD release by the Warner Archive Collection in November 2015.

== Legacy ==
Because of this film's existence, 20th Century Fox's 1996 film Independence Day did not initially use the title and instead during production went under the working title of ID4. Once the filmmakers showed the executives the dailies, particularly the speech by Bill Pullman's character President Whitmore, Fox executives worked out a deal with Warner Bros. allowing them to use the name.
