= Jean Charles Davillier =

French writer and art collector

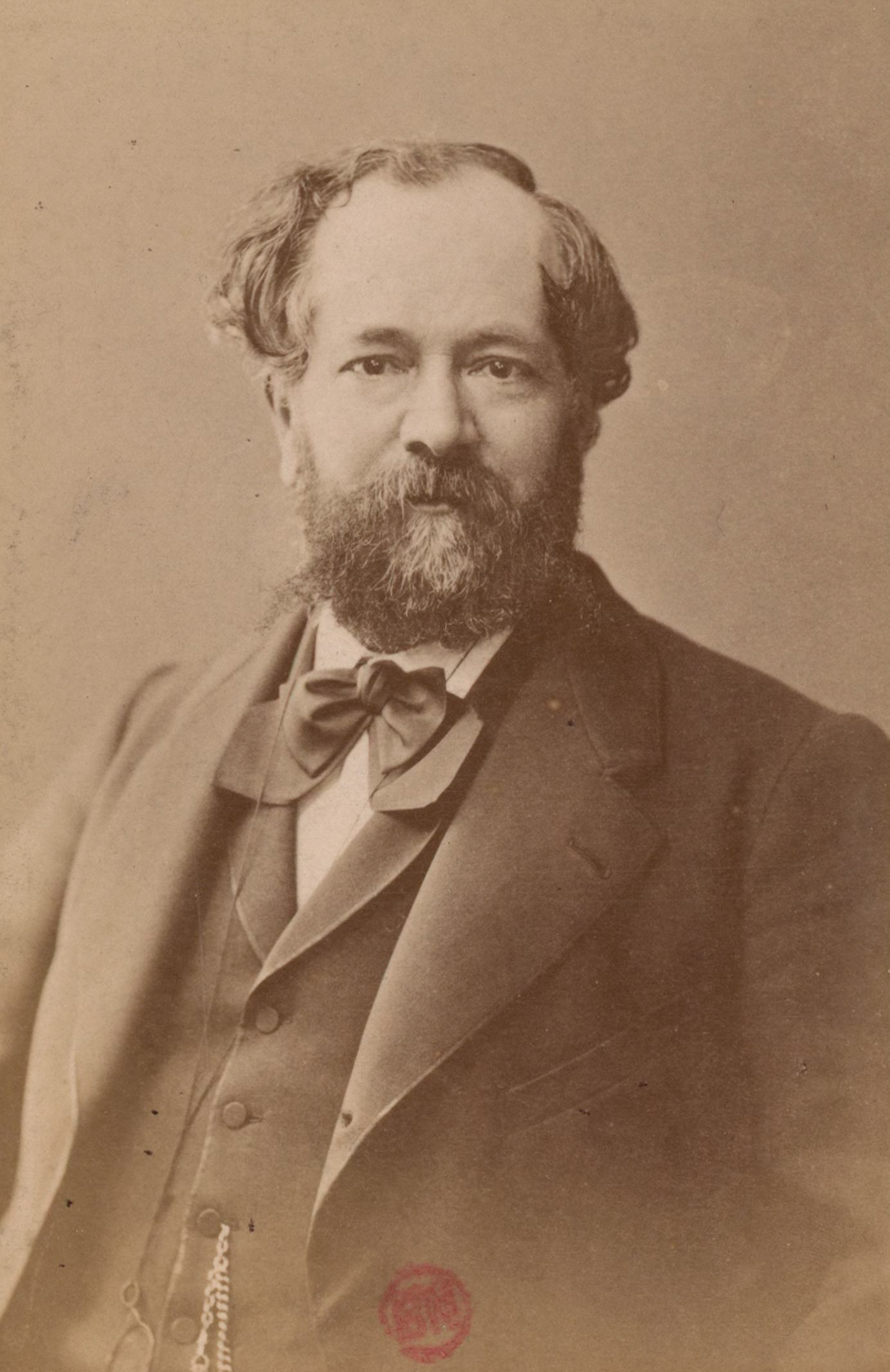
- Born: 17 May 1823; Rouen
- Died: 1 March 1883 (aged 59); Paris
- Resting place: Cimetière du Père Lachaise

Jean Charles Davillier (17 March 1823 – 1 March 1883) was a French writer and art collector.

Grandson of the banker Jean Charles Joachim Davillier, his inheritance was donated to the Louvre, Bibliothèque nationale de France and the Manufacture nationale de Sèvres.
